= Wickersham House =

Wickersham House may refer to any of the following residences of James Wickersham. Wickersham lived in these houses from 1900 until his death in 1939:

- Wickersham House (Eagle, Alaska), part of the Eagle Historic District, listed on the National Register of Historic Places in Southeast Fairbanks Census Area, Alaska
- Wickersham House (Fairbanks, Alaska), listed on the National Register of Historic Places in Fairbanks North Star Borough, Alaska
- Wickersham House (Juneau, Alaska), listed on the National Register of Historic Places in Juneau, Alaska
