= Pacific Highway (United States) =

Road between San Diego, CA, and Vancouver, Canada

Pacific Highway

Route information
- Existed: 1913–1926 (Note: As an official auto trail)

Major junctions
- South end: San Diego, CA
- North end: Vancouver, BC

Location
- Country: United States
- States: California, Oregon, Washington, (also Vancouver in British Columbia)

Highway system
- Auto trails

Pacific Highway is the name of several north–south highways in the Pacific Coast region of the Western United States, either by legislation officially designating it as such or by common usage.

== Description ==
Good roads advocate and road-building pioneer Sam Hill was perhaps the main motivating force behind building the original Pacific Highway as a "national auto trail"; from Blaine, Washington, on the Canada–United States border, where he would build his Peace Arch, through Oregon to the Siskiyou Mountains of northwestern California. The road was built in the early 20th century—long before the United States Numbered Highway System was established. In 1926, its 1,687 miles (2,715 km) of pavement made it the longest continuous stretch of paved road in the world at the time. The Pacific Highway later extended north to Vancouver, British Columbia, and south through San Francisco to San Diego in Southern California.

The Pacific Highway auto trail became British Columbia Highway 99 from Vancouver to the Canada–United States border, U.S. Route 99 from the border to Red Bluff, California, in the Sacramento Valley; U.S. Route 99W from Red Bluff to Davis, California, in the Central Valley; U.S. Route 40 from Davis to San Francisco; and U.S. Route 101 from San Francisco to San Diego. This alignment is now mostly Interstate 5 in California, except between Woodland, and Los Angeles, where it uses State Route 113, Interstate 80 and then U.S. Route 101. Several routes are named Pacific Highway.

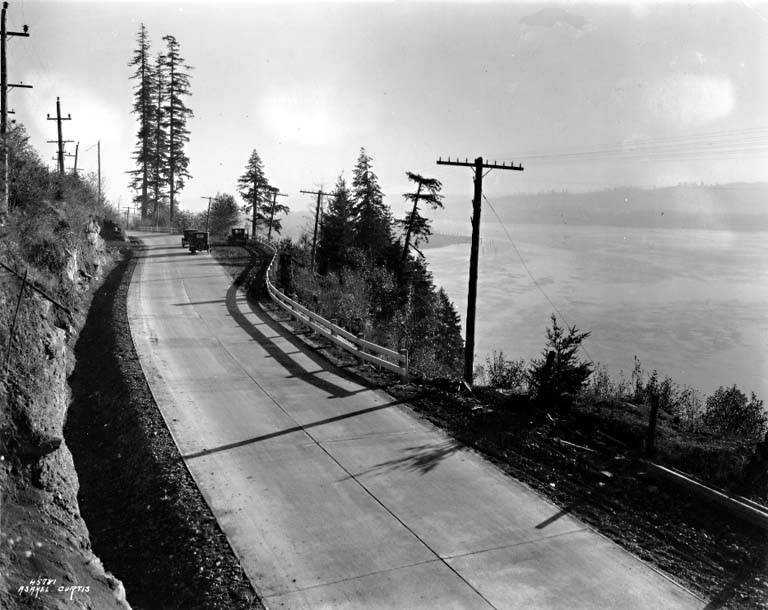
Pacific Highway along the Columbia River in Washington, c. 1925

In Oregon, Interstate 5 is now officially the Pacific Highway No. 1 (see Oregon highways and routes). First completed in 1923, Oregon's Pacific Highway was the first border-to-border paved highway west of the Mississippi River.

In California, Interstate 5 (Oregon's Pacific Highway) immediately becomes the Cascade Wonderland Highway as soon as it crosses the border, as far as Red Bluff, south of Redding. South from there, it takes on other names such as West Side Freeway or Golden State Freeway, through southern California. The name "Pacific Highway" only currently corresponds with I-5, for a limited stretch of Interstate 5, in Oregon and part of Washington, but not in California. An old freeway section of U.S. Route 101 parallel to Interstate 5 near San Diego International Airport is known as "Pacific Highway," and is now locally maintained.

== History ==
An extensive section of the Pacific Highway (over 600 miles [970 km]), from approximately Stockton, California to Vancouver, Washington, followed very closely the track of the Siskiyou Trail. The Siskiyou Trail was based on an ancient network of Native American footpaths connecting the Pacific Northwest with California's Central Valley.

By the 1820s, trappers from the Hudson's Bay Company were the first non-Native Americans to use the route of the future Pacific Highway to move between today's state of Washington and "Alta California". During the second half of the 19th Century, mule trains, stagecoaches, and the Central Pacific Railroad also followed the route of the Siskiyou Trail.

In the early 20th century, around 1910, entrepreneur Sam Hill lobbied the governments of Washington and Oregon to build automobile roads along the path of the Siskiyou Trail, with the ultimate goal of building a paved auto route from Alaska to Mexico. Hill formed the Pacific Highway Association with himself as president and influential supporters from Alaska to California to serve as officers, including attorney Falcon Joslin of Fairbanks, Alaska, member of parliament Alfred Thompson of Dawson, Yukon Territory, mayor Albert E. Todd of Victoria, British Columbia, Frank M. Fretwell of Seattle, Washington, and attorney Frank Branch Riley of Portland, Oregon.
