= Fairbanks North Star Borough School District =

School district in Alaska, United States

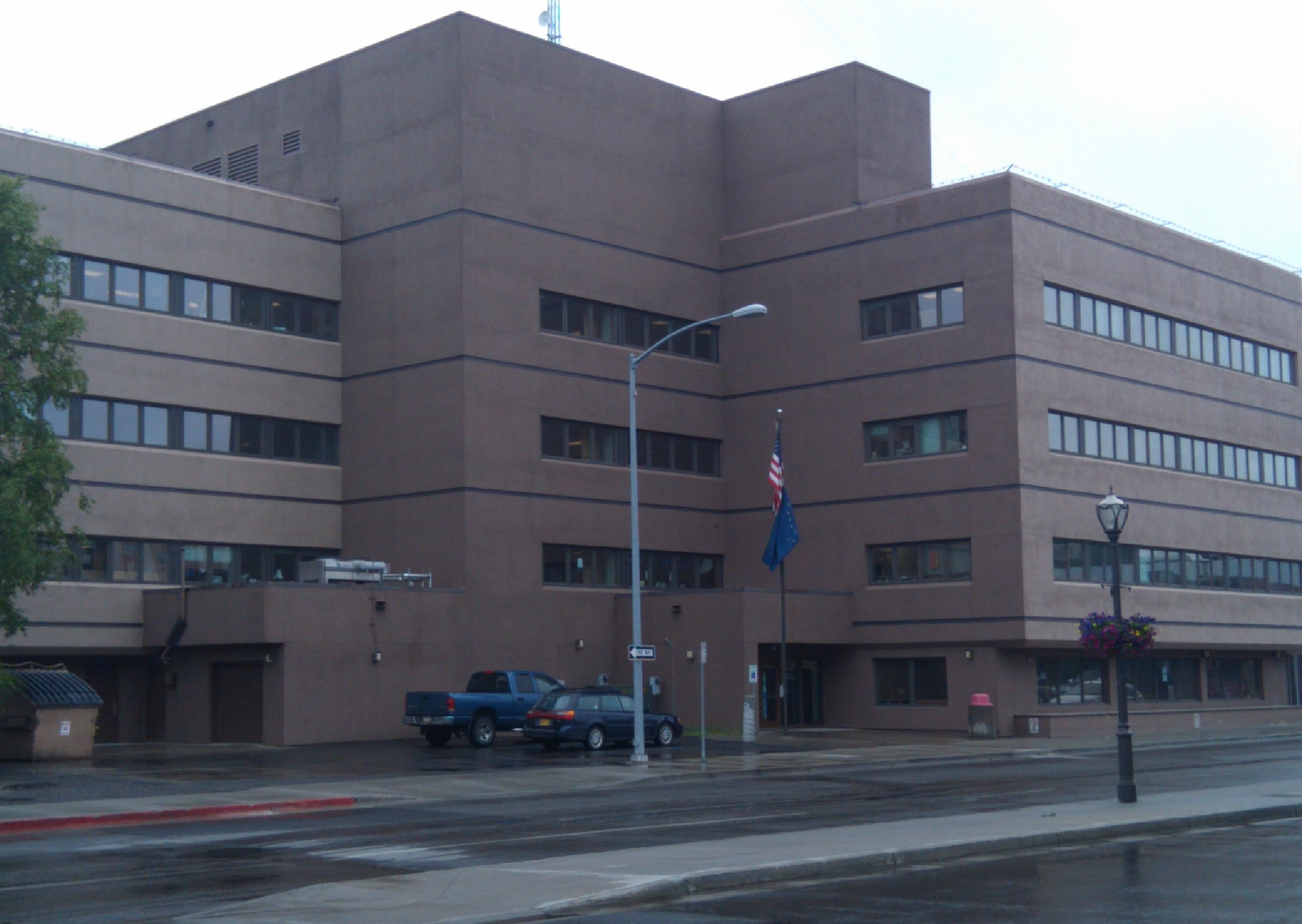
- School district headquarters building in downtown Fairbanks.

Address
- 520 Fifth Avenue Fairbanks, Alaska, 99701; United States
- Coordinates: 64°50′31.5″N 147°43′04″W

District information
- Type: Public school district
- Schools: 33
- NCES District ID: 0200600

Students and staff
- Students: 11,857 (2024–25)
- Teachers: 608.24 (on an FTE basis)
- Staff: 907.41
- Student–teacher ratio: 19.49

Other information
- Website: www.k12northstar.org

The Fairbanks North Star Borough School District is a public school district based in Fairbanks, Alaska, United States.

The district encompasses all of Fairbanks North Star Borough, an area of 7,361 square miles (19,060 km^{2}), which is roughly equal to the size of Rhode Island, Delaware, and Connecticut combined.

== History ==
In 1904 the first public school opened in Fairbanks. This building was made of wood, and was destroyed by a fire on December 4, 1932. A replacement facility, named Main School and now known as Fairbanks City Hall, opened on January 22, 1934. Additional schools began opening circa the 1940s and 1950s.

For the 2011–2012 school year, enrollment in the district was 14,260. For the 2021–2022 school year, enrollment was 12,268, down 14% from the 2011–2012 school year.

In February 2022, the school board made several decisions, including one to close three elementary schools in the Fairbanks North Star Borough, which would save the district $3 million a year. The school district made the decision based a on $20 million budget shortfall. Alaska Public Media reported that "The district will also restructure district middle schools to encompass grades 6 through 8, while most elementary schools will become K-5 schools." In 2022 the school district set the grade configuration of middle schools to grades 6-8.

== Schools ==
=== Senior high schools ===
- Grades 9–12
  - Hutchison High School (Fairbanks)
  - Lathrop High School (Fairbanks)
  - North Pole High School (North Pole)
    - It is the zoned high school for Eielson Air Force Base.
  - West Valley High School (Fairbanks)
  - North Star College

=== Middle schools ===
- Grades 6–8
  - North Pole Middle School (North Pole)
  - Randy Smith Middle School (Fairbanks)
  - Ryan Middle School (Fairbanks)
  - Tanana Middle School (Fairbanks)

=== Elementary-Middle schools ===
- Grades PK–8
  - Barnette Magnet School (Fairbanks)
  - Two Rivers School (Fairbanks)

=== Elementary schools ===
- Grades PK–5
  - Anne Hopkins Wien Elementary School (Fairbanks)
  - Arctic Light Elementary School (Fort Wainwright)
  - Two Rivers Elementary School (Fairbanks)
  - Denali Elementary School (Fairbanks)
  - Hunter Elementary School (Fairbanks)
  - Ladd Elementary School (Fairbanks) PK–8
  - Midnight Sun Elementary School (Fairbanks)
    - It was formerly Badger Road Elementary School and renamed in 2017. The school was renamed because the previous namesake, Badger Road, was named after Harry Badger (died in 1965), who had, in 1916, been convicted of committing a criminal act against a child.
  - North Pole Elementary School (North Pole)
  - Pearl Creek Elementary School (Fairbanks)
  - Salcha Elementary School (Salcha)
  - Emily Ticasuk Ivanoff Brown Elementary School (Fairbanks)
    - Its namesake is Ticasuk Brown.
  - University Park Elementary School (Fairbanks)
  - Weller Elementary School (Fairbanks)
  - Woodriver Elementary School (Fairbanks)
  - Note: The Board of Education voted on Feb. 4, 2025, to close Pearl Creek, along with Midnight Sun and Two Rivers Elementary schools, to address a budget deficit and consolidate enrollment.

=== Charter schools ===
- Grades 7–12
  - Effie Kokrine Charter School (Fairbanks)
  - Star of the North Secondary Charter School
    - North Pole Academy (North Pole)
    - Career Education Center (Fairbanks)
- Grades PK–8 or K–8
  - Chinook Charter Montessori School (Fairbanks) K–8
  - The Watershed School (Fairbanks) K–8
  - Barnette Magnet School (Fairbanks) PK–8

=== Alternative programs ===
- Guided Independent Studies Home Schooling Program
- Star of the North

== Former schools ==
- Grades 7–12
  - Ben Eielson Junior/Senior High School (Eielson AFB) - The school closed in 2024. The closure was due to a loss in funds.
- Elementary schools
  - Anderson Elementary School (Eielson AFB, grades K-2) - In 2022 Anderson closed.
  - Joy Elementary School (Fairbanks, later a K-8 school) - Closed in 2022.
  - Main Elementary School - Originally named Main School, it opened on January 22, 1934 to replace a school which had burned down. It received its final name by 1955. It closed in 1976, had several other uses, and became Fairbanks City Hall.
  - Nordale Elementary School - In 2022 it was scheduled to become a facility for alternative education programs.
- Alternative schools
  - Howard Luke Academy (high school) - It was named after Howard Luke. Effie Kokrine Charter School is located in the ex-Howard Luke facility.

== Enrollment ==
2007–2008 School Year: 14,227 Students
2006–2007 School Year: 15,017 Students
2005–2006 School Year: 14,677 Students
2004–2005 School Year: 14,754 Students
2003–2004 School Year: 14,810 Students

== Demographics ==
There were a total of 14,227 students enrolled in the Fairbanks North Star Borough School District during the 2007–2008 school year. Of these, 14,031 were enrolled in grades K-12 and 196 were pre-elementary (early childhood) students. The racial makeup of the district was 66.65% White, 14.45% Alaska Native, 8.34% African American, 5.48% Hispanic, 4.05% Asian, 0.79% Native Hawaiian/Pacific Islander, and 0.24% American Indian.

== See also ==
- List of school districts in Alaska
