= Fairbanks City Hall =

- Main School
- U.S. National Register of Historic Places
- Alaska Heritage Resources Survey
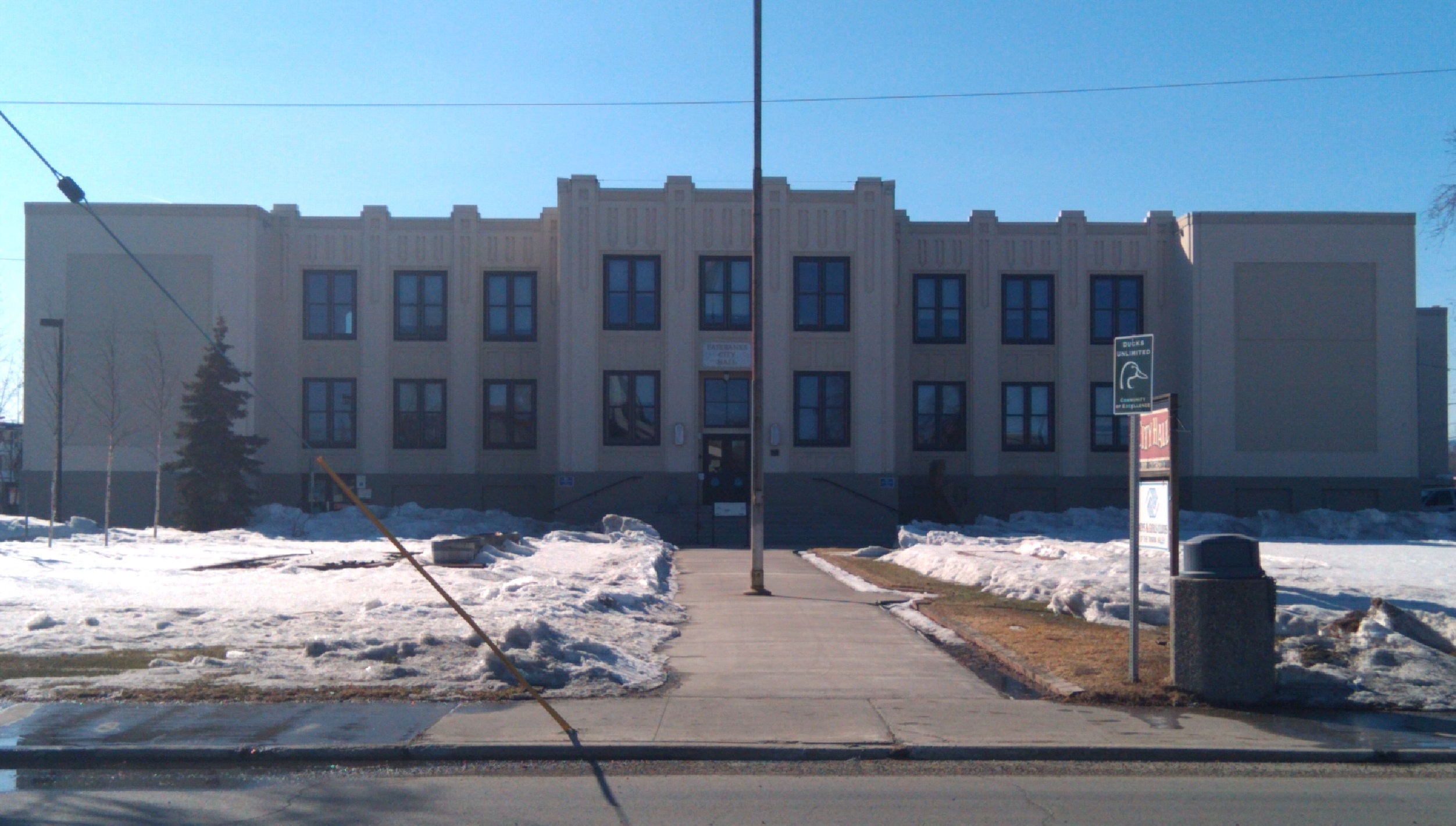

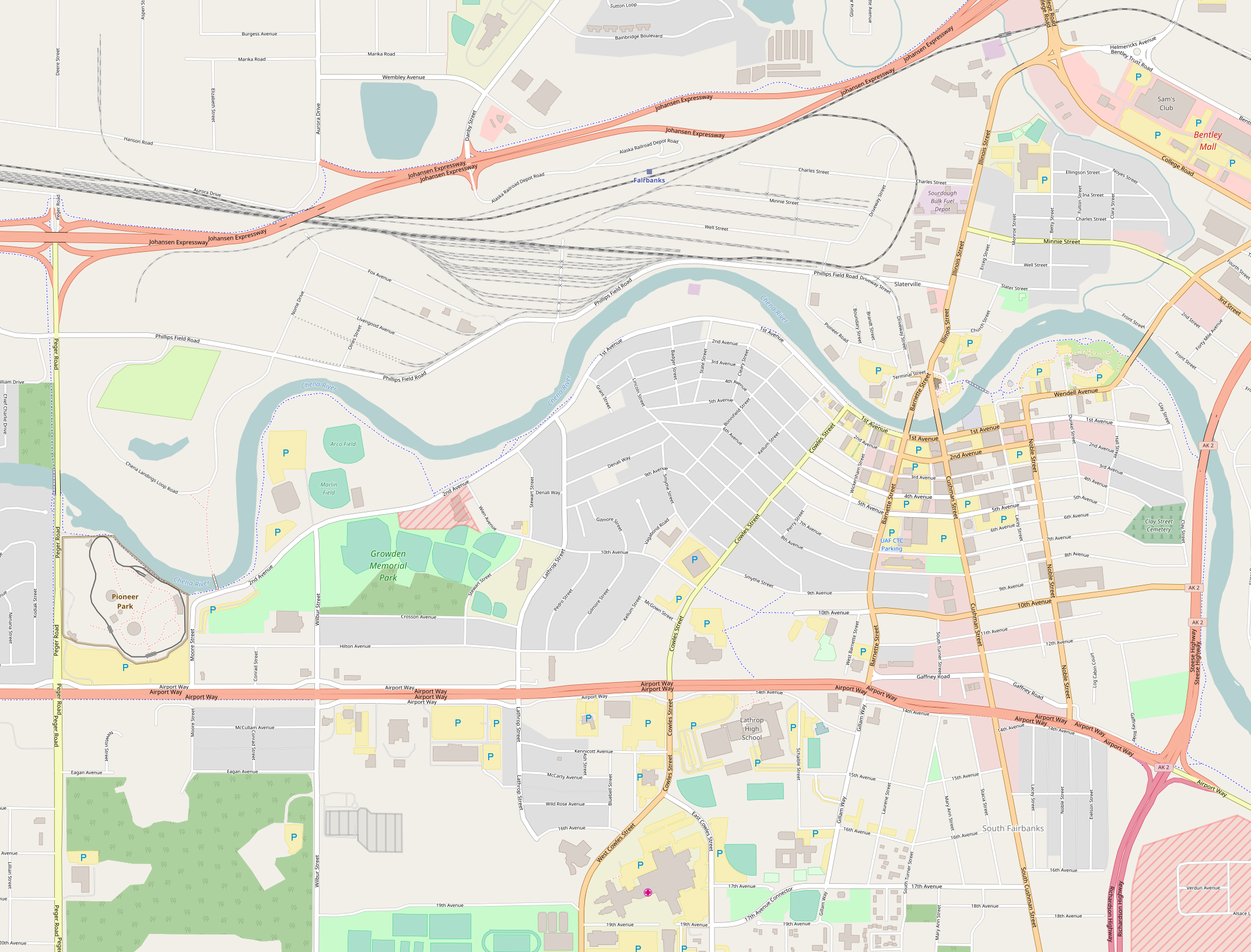
- Location within Downtown Fairbanks Location within Alaska
- Location: 800 Cushman Street, Fairbanks, Alaska
- Coordinates: 64°50′23″N 147°43′16″W
- Area: 1.8 acres (0.73 ha)
- Built: 1934
- Built by: William MacDonald Construction Company
- Architect: Tourtellotte & Hummel
- Architectural style: Art Deco
- NRHP reference No.: 90001472
- AHRS No.: FAI-244
- Added to NRHP: September 27, 1990

The Patrick B. Cole Fairbanks City Hall, also known as Main School and Old Main for its previous use as a school building, is located at 800 Cushman Street in downtown Fairbanks, Alaska. An Art Deco concrete building, it was built in 1934 to replace the original Fairbanks school, a wooden building constructed in 1907 which burned down in late 1932. As Fairbanks grew exponentially with the military buildup associated with World War II and the Cold War, the building was enlarged in 1939 and again in 1948.

It was the city's only school from its opening in 1934 until the opening of Denali Elementary School in 1951. It became a junior/senior high school for several years until Lathrop High School began operation. The school then became Main Junior High School until it was replaced by Ryan Junior High School and Tanana Junior High School during the early 1970s.

Following the disestablishment of Main Junior High, instruction in the building was mostly limited to alternative education programs. The building's primary purpose at that point was to house the administrative offices of the Fairbanks North Star Borough School District, a role it filled from 1976 until 1993. Most of those offices moved to the school district's current Fifth Avenue headquarters in the mid 1980s, and the building sat largely vacant for many years, eventually being completely abandoned.

The building has housed city offices since 1994, which moved from the longtime Fairbanks City Hall three blocks to the north. In addition to city offices, the former school gymnasium is home to the Fairbanks Boys & Girls Club. Previous non-governmental tenants of the building under city ownership have included the Fairbanks Boxing Club and the Greater Fairbanks Chamber of Commerce.

The building was listed on the National Register of Historic Places in 1990 as Main School. In 2014, the building was renamed the Patrick B. Cole City Hall after Patrick Cole, a long time City Manager and Chief of Staff to eight Fairbanks City Mayors.

== See also ==
- National Register of Historic Places listings in Fairbanks North Star Borough, Alaska
