= Lacey Street Theatre =

- U.S. National Register of Historic Places
- Alaska Heritage Resources Survey
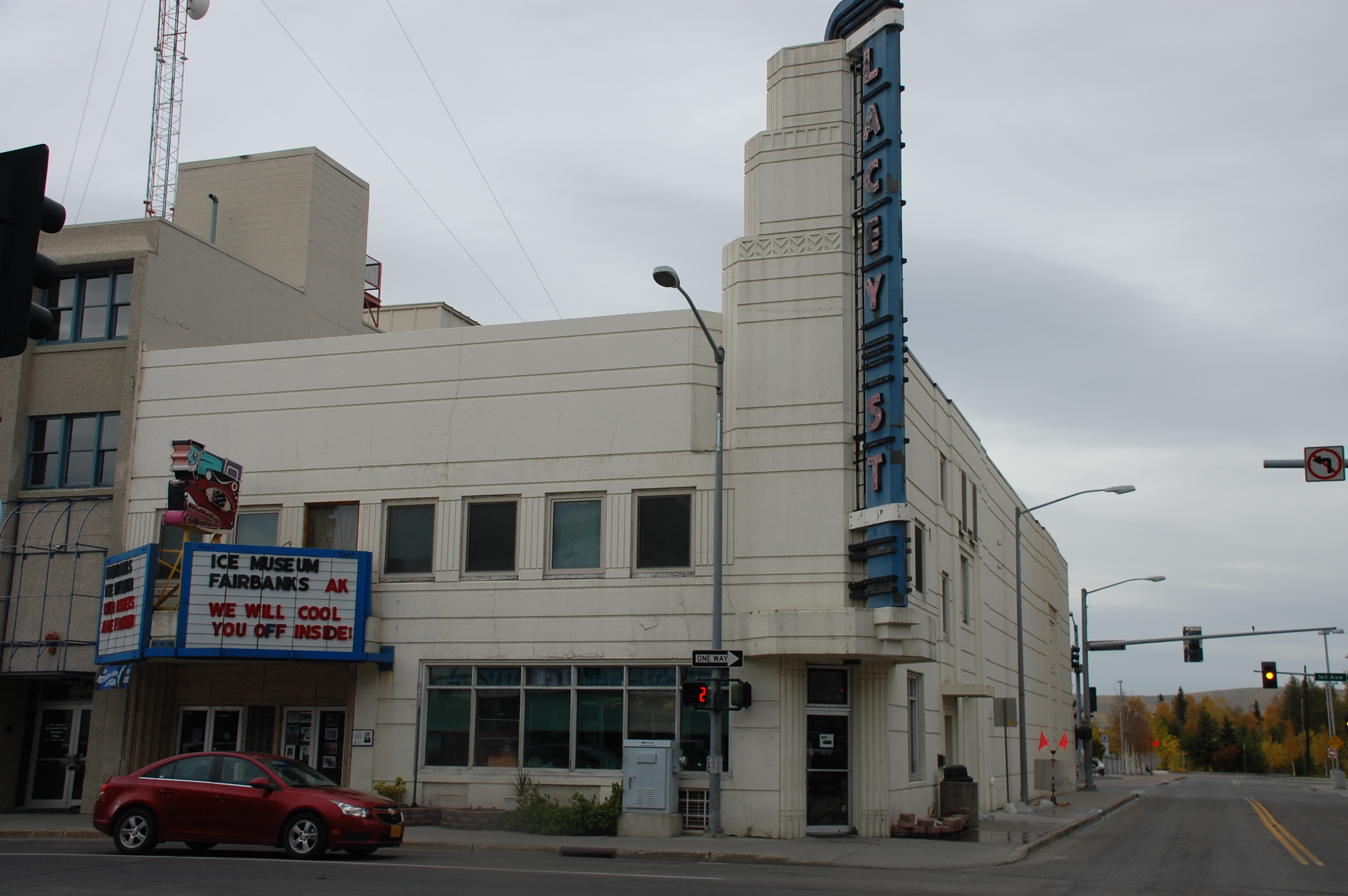

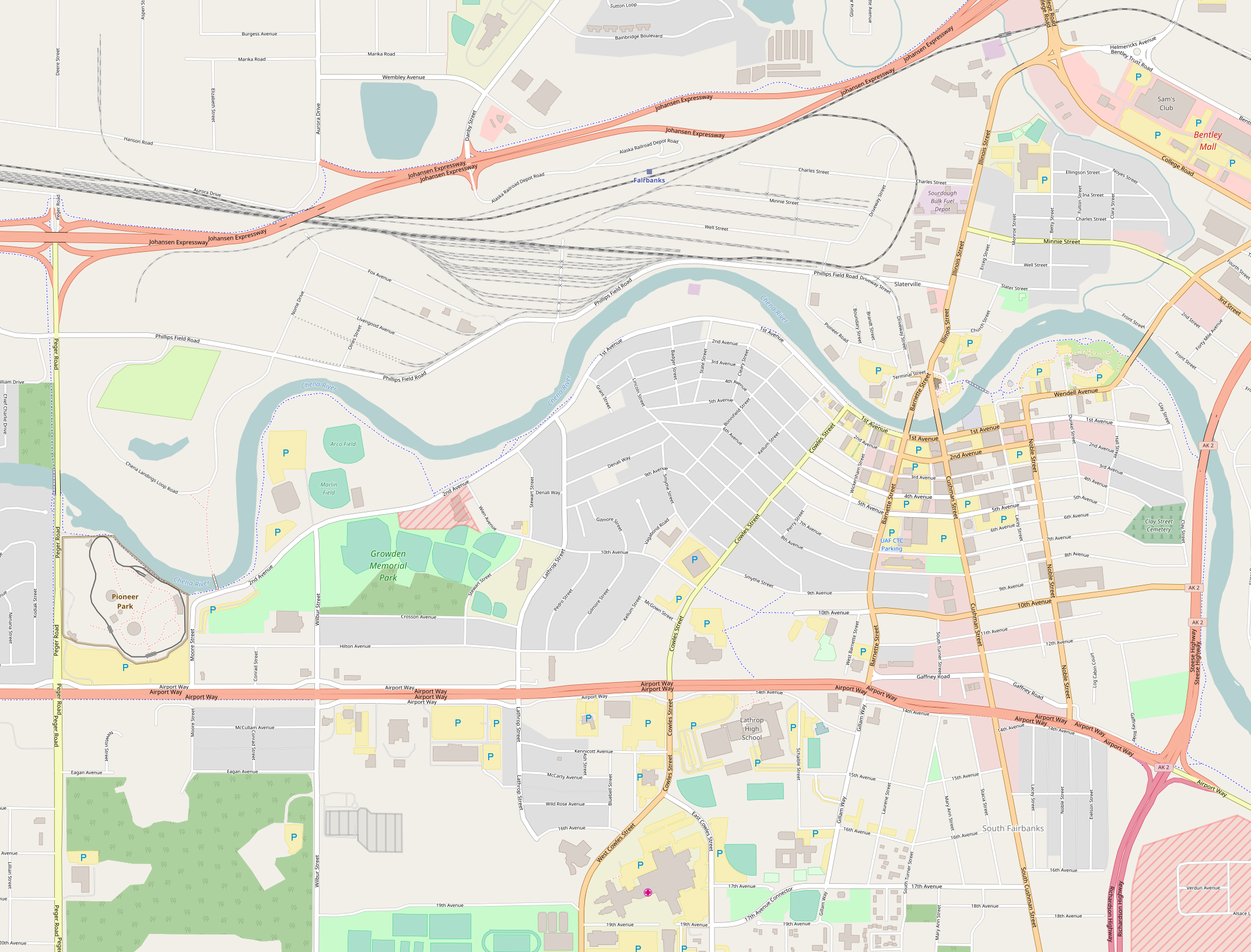
- Location within Downtown Fairbanks Location within Alaska
- Location: 500 Second Avenue, Fairbanks, Alaska
- Coordinates: 64°50′38″N 147°43′4″W
- Area: less than one acre
- Built: 1939
- Built by: C.W. Hufeisen
- Architect: B. Marcus Priteca
- Architectural style: Art Deco
- NRHP reference No.: 90000878
- AHRS No.: FAI-207
- Added to NRHP: June 14, 1990

The Lacey Street Theatre building, now hosting the Fairbanks Ice Museum, is an Art Deco architectural showpiece theatre located at 500 Second Avenue in Fairbanks, Alaska. It was designed by noted theatre designer B. Marcus Priteca, and built in 1939 by C.W. Hufeisen for Austin E. "Cap" Lathrop, one of a chain of movie theaters built by Lathrop across Alaska, and one of only two in Fairbanks into the 1960s. It opened on January 25, 1940. It closed in December 1980, and was repurposed as a museum of ice sculpture in 1992.

The building was listed on the National Register of Historic Places in 1990.

== See also ==
- National Register of Historic Places listings in Fairbanks North Star Borough, Alaska
