= Chugwater Site =

Archaeological site in Alaska, United States

- U.S. National Register of Historic Places
- Alaska Heritage Resources Survey
- Location: Address restricted, Fairbanks North Star Borough, Alaska, U.S.
- Nearest city: North Pole, Alaska
- Area: 46.5 acres (18.8 ha)
- NRHP reference No.: 79003754
- AHRS No.: FAI-035
- Added to NRHP: November 23, 1979

The Chugwater Site is a prehistoric archaeological site on the banks of the Tanana River near Moose Creek, Alaska. The site covers more than 40 acres (16 ha) on a bluff overlooking the river, and consists of widely scattered stone toolmaking debris, interspersed with other artifacts. The site was listed on the National Register of Historic Places in 1979.

== Excavations ==
The area was extensively sampled in 1982-83 by the United States Army Corps of Engineers, identifying a variety of stone tools and types of stone used in their manufacture. A more extensive excavation of the site took place in 1984, exposing a number of larger stone tools and projectile heads, as well as microblades, which are usually attached to bone or wood handles. One projectile point found is of a style similar to those found at another Alaska site which has been dated back 10,000 years.

== See also ==
- National Register of Historic Places listings in Fairbanks North Star Borough, Alaska
