= Chatanika Gold Camp =

- U.S. National Register of Historic Places
- Alaska Heritage Resources Survey
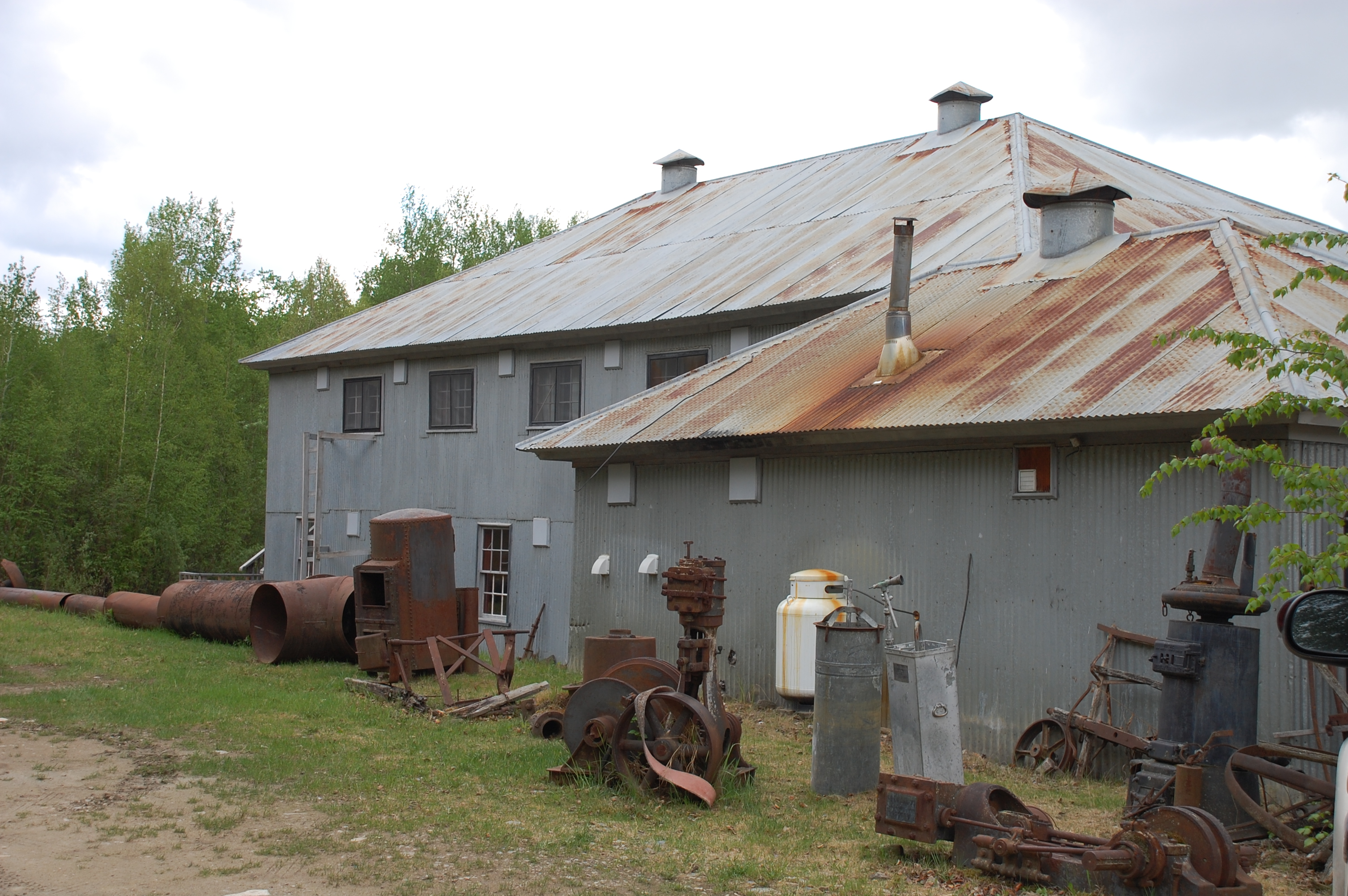

- Location within Alaska
- Location: Mile 27¾, Steese Highway, Chatanika, Alaska
- Coordinates: 65°06′42″N 147°28′49″W
- Area: 49.1 acres (19.9 ha)
- Built: 1925
- Built by: Fairbanks Exploration Company
- NRHP reference No.: 79003753
- AHRS No.: LIV-023

Significant dates
- Added to NRHP: October 16, 1979
- Designated AHRS: June 30, 1974

The Chatanika Gold Camp is a historic gold mining camp at Mile 27¾ of the Steese Highway in Chatanika, Alaska. The camp is set on about 49 acres (20 ha) overlooking Cleary Creek, and consists of thirteen buildings as well as a scattering of old mining tools and equipment. The largest of the buildings are two bunkhouses, finished in corrugated metal. The camp was built in 1925 by the Fairbanks Exploration Company (FEC), which also dug the nearby Davidson Ditch to supply water for the operation of the gold dredges. The Chatanika Camp was the largest of the FEC's mining camps in the Fairbanks area. Five of the surviving buildings date to the initial construction period.

The camp was listed on the National Register of Historic Places in 1979.

== See also ==
- National Register of Historic Places listings in Fairbanks North Star Borough, Alaska
