= Creamer's Field Migratory Waterfowl Refuge =

Bird sanctuary in Alaska, U.S.

- Creamer's Dairy
- U.S. National Register of Historic Places
- Alaska Heritage Resources Survey
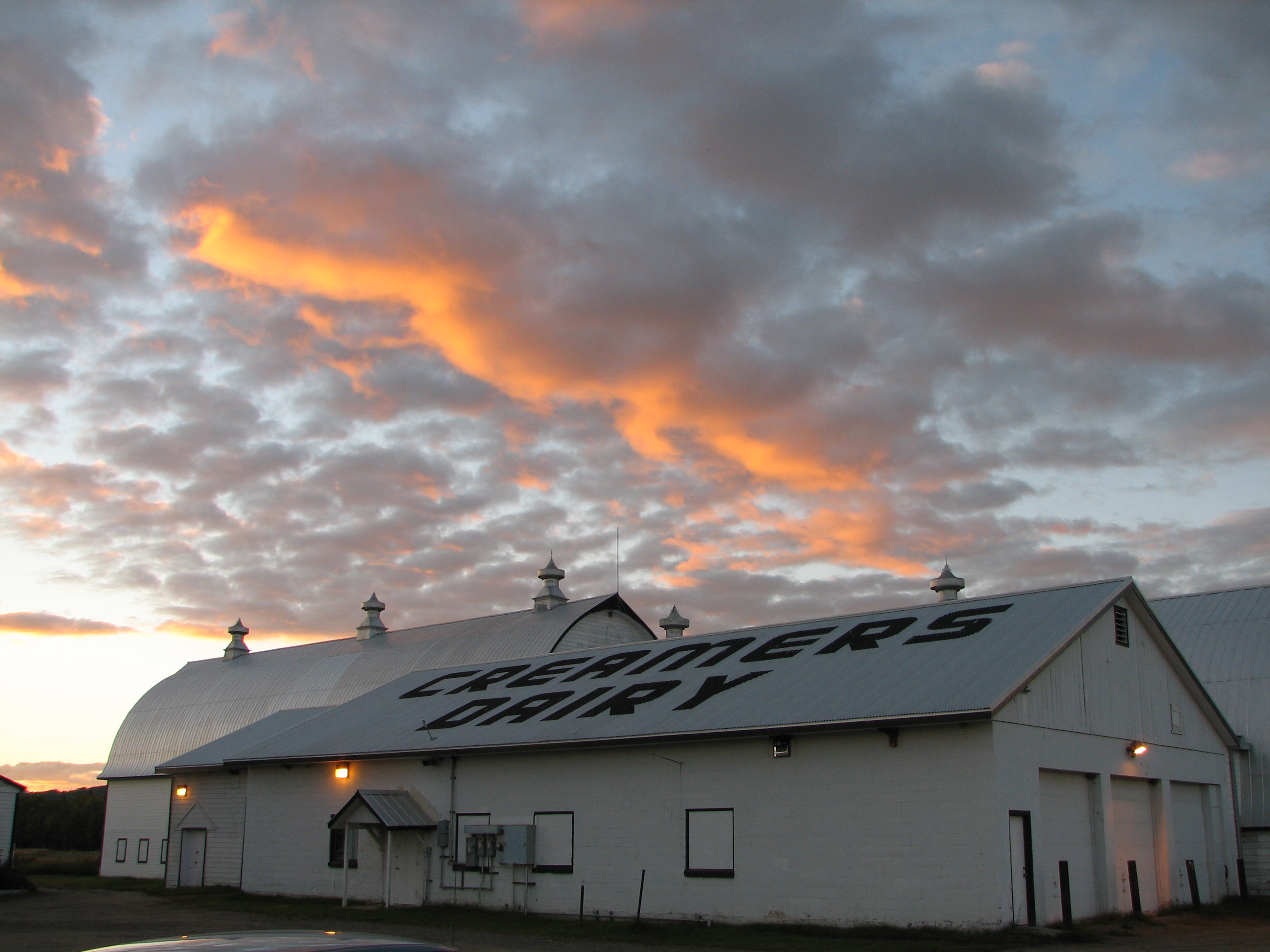

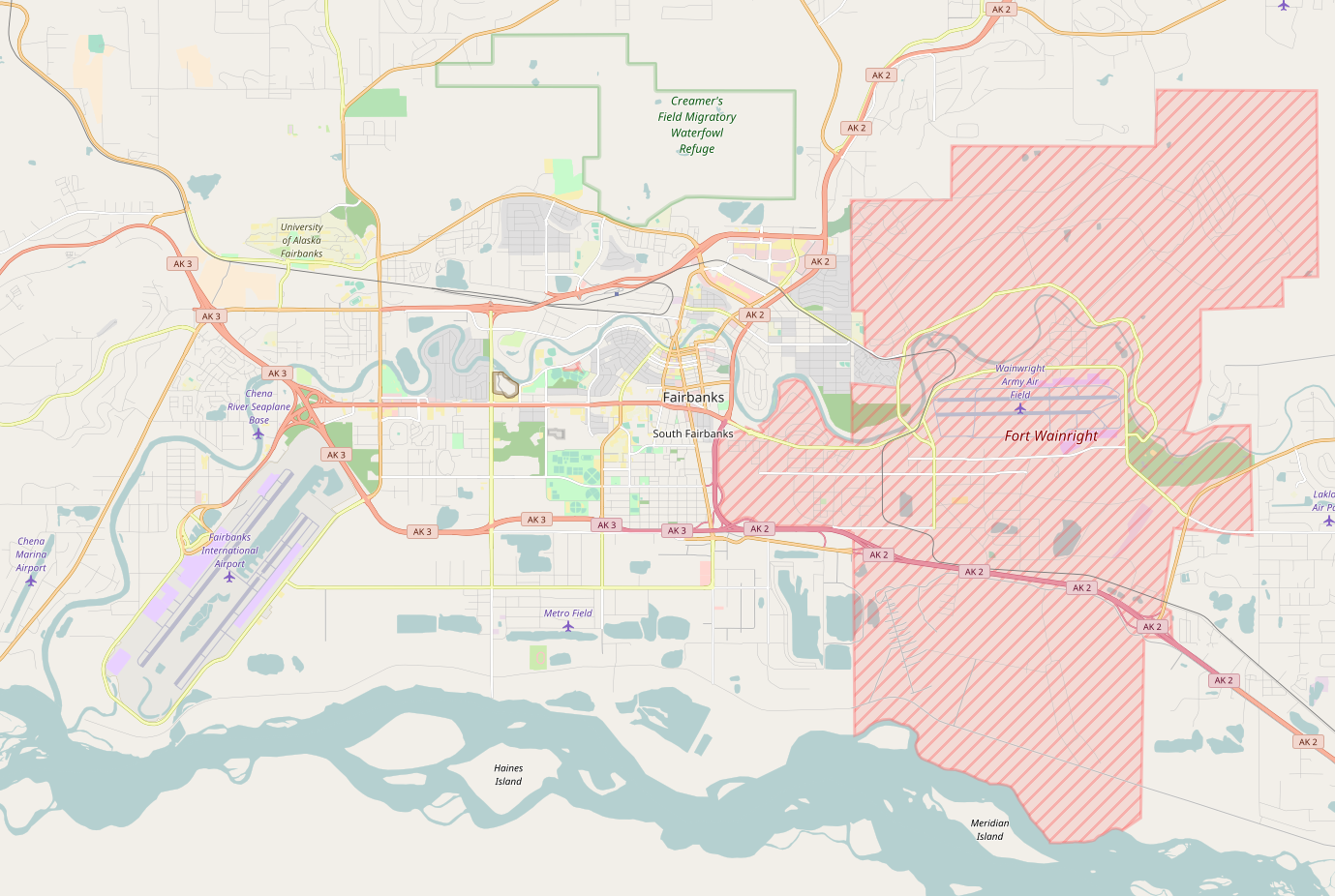
- Location within Fairbanks Location within Alaska
- Location: At end of Creamer Lane, in Creamers Field Migratory Waterfowl Refuge, Fairbanks, Alaska
- Coordinates: 64°51′51″N 147°44′16″W
- Area: 12 acres (4.9 ha)
- Built: 1904
- Built by: Charles T. Hinckley; Charles Albert Creamer
- NRHP reference No.: 77001572
- AHRS No.: FAIR-85

Significant dates
- Added to NRHP: April 13, 1977
- Designated AHRS: May 20, 1975

Creamer's Field Migratory Waterfowl Refuge is a 2,200 acre (7.3 km^{2}) bird sanctuary, located within the Fairbanks North Star Borough, Alaska, and partially within the city limits of Fairbanks. It consists of wetlands, fields, and forests. The refuge surrounds the former farm of Charles Hinckley and later Charles Albert Creamer (1889–1974), a former chicken rancher from Washington state who moved to Fairbanks. Creamer saved waste grains from his barn to feed migrating birds. After Creamer's death, preservationists banded together to make the area a state refuge. The Creamer farmstead now serves as a visitor center and environmental education center, with the non-profit "Friends of Creamer's Field" presenting programs year-round. In the summer visitors can take a guided nature walk on the refuge trails. The refuge is open 24 hours a day 7 days a week. It is a multi-use refuge, and limited hunting is also allowed in certain seasons. In winter dog mushing trails criss cross the back of the acreage, while skijorers have trails in the front fields.

Among the birds that flock to the refuge in spring and fall during migrations are sandhill cranes, loons, swans, Canada geese, plovers, and sandpipers. In total, over 100 bird species have been spotted in the refuge.

== History ==
Charles Hinckley built a log barn and opened a dairy business upon arriving in Fairbanks in 1904. In 1938 Charles Albert Creamer succeeded to Hinckley and built the modern day barn, which is still visible today. All other buildings in the area were constructed subsequently after, up to the closure of business in 1965. The State of Alaska purchased all the land around the dairy in 1969, to establish the Migratory Refuge. The property is the only group of pioneer dairy farm buildings surviving in the interior of Alaska.

The Creamer's Dairy, also known as Hinckley's Dairy, comprising the barn and five other historical buildings, was listed on the National Register of Historic Places in 1977.

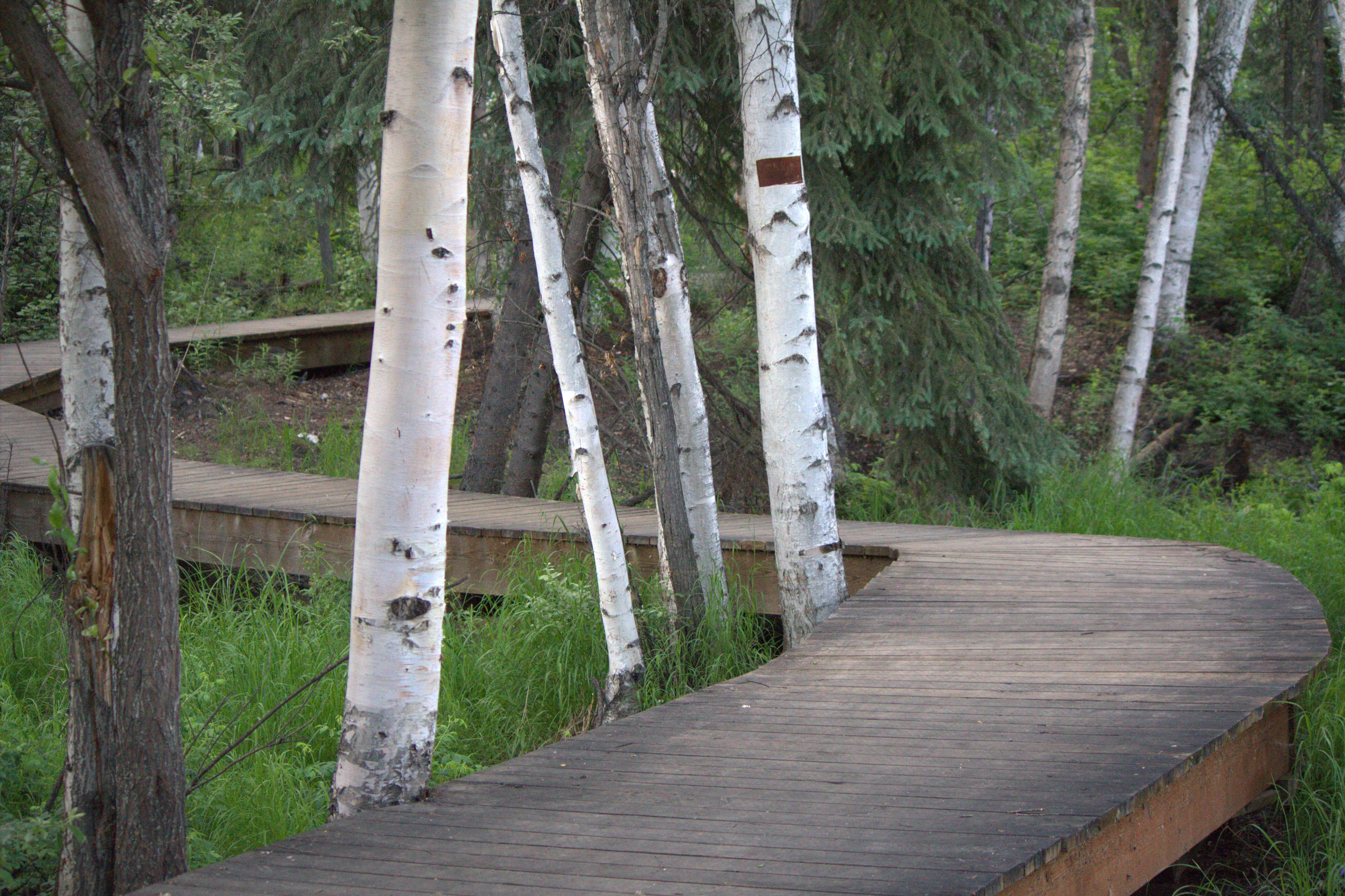
View of the elevated trail through the boreal forest at Creamers Field

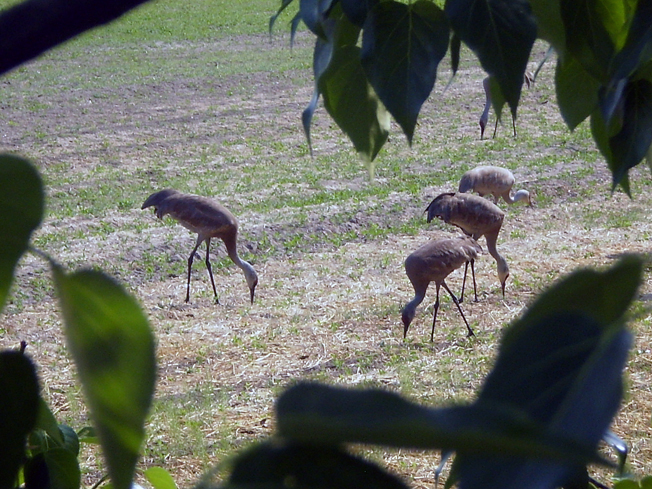
Sandhill cranes at Creamers Field

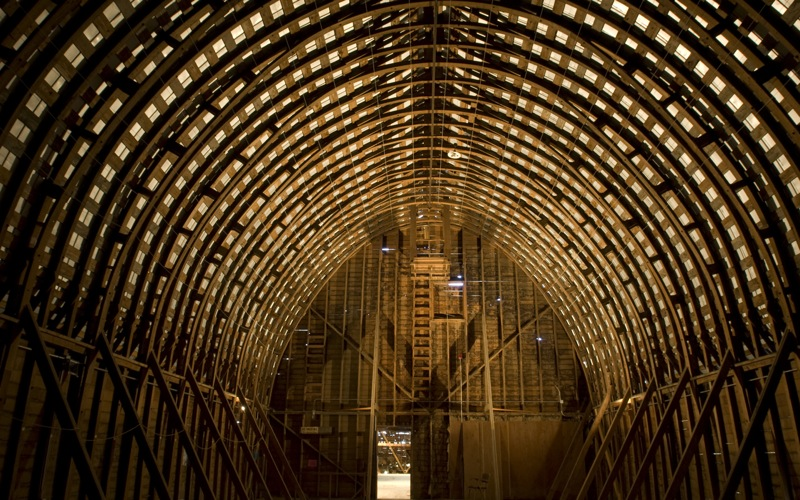
Interior of Creamer's barn

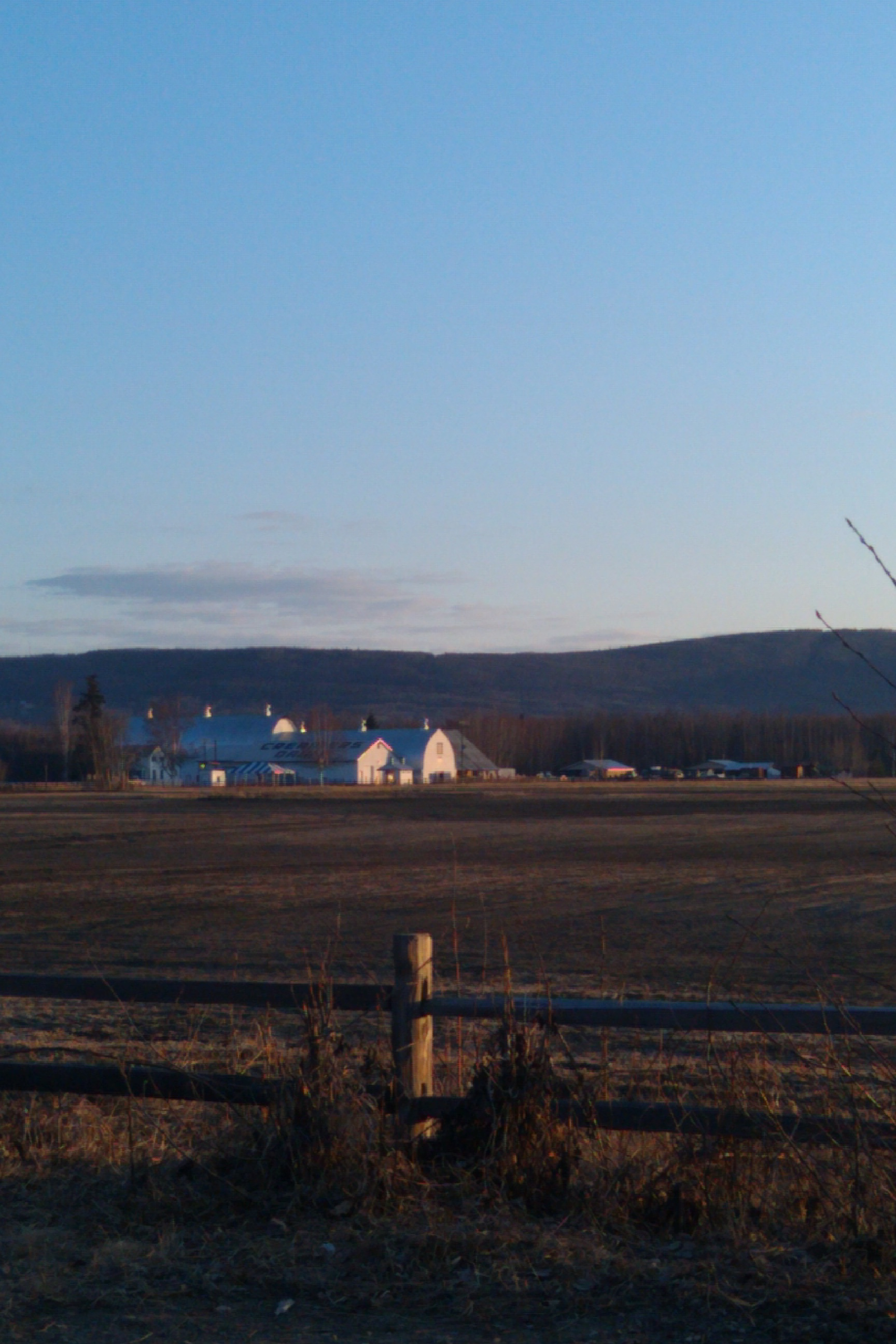
Field of the former Creamer's Dairy

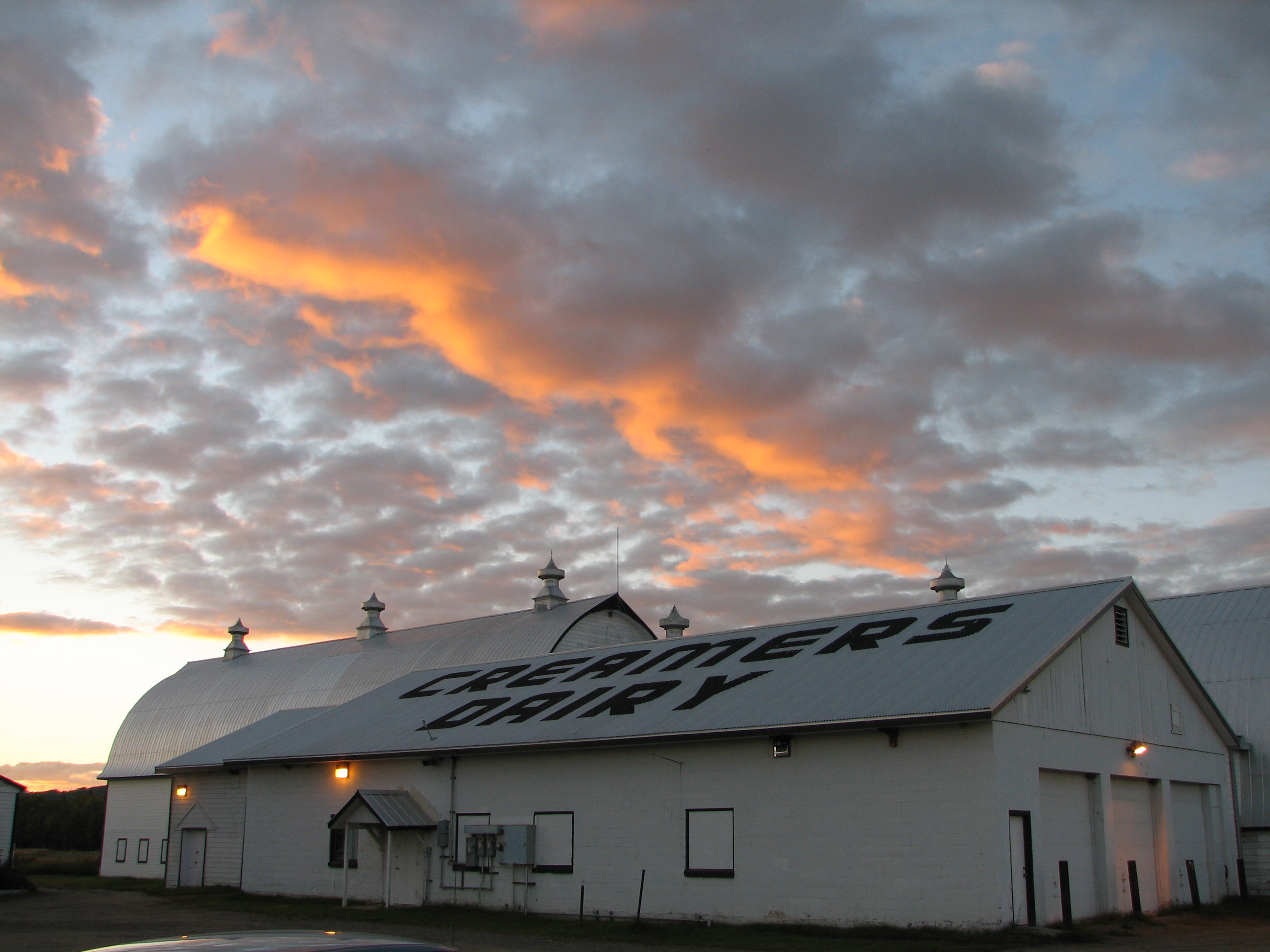
Closeup of the dairy barns

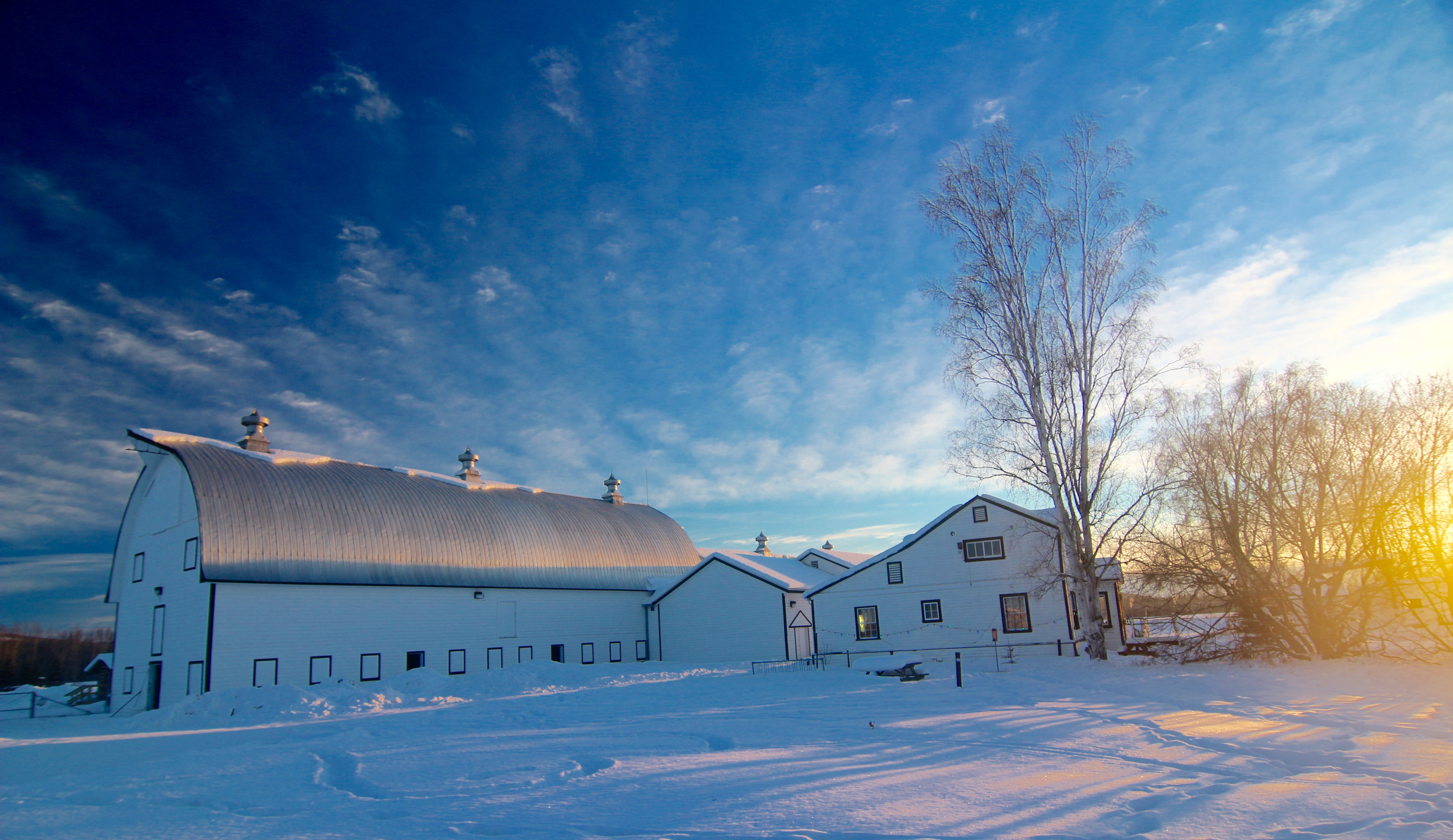
Creamer Dairy - February sunrise.

== See also ==
- National Register of Historic Places listings in Fairbanks North Star Borough, Alaska
