= Mary Lee Davis House =

Historic house in Alaska, United States

- U.S. National Register of Historic Places
- Alaska Heritage Resources Survey
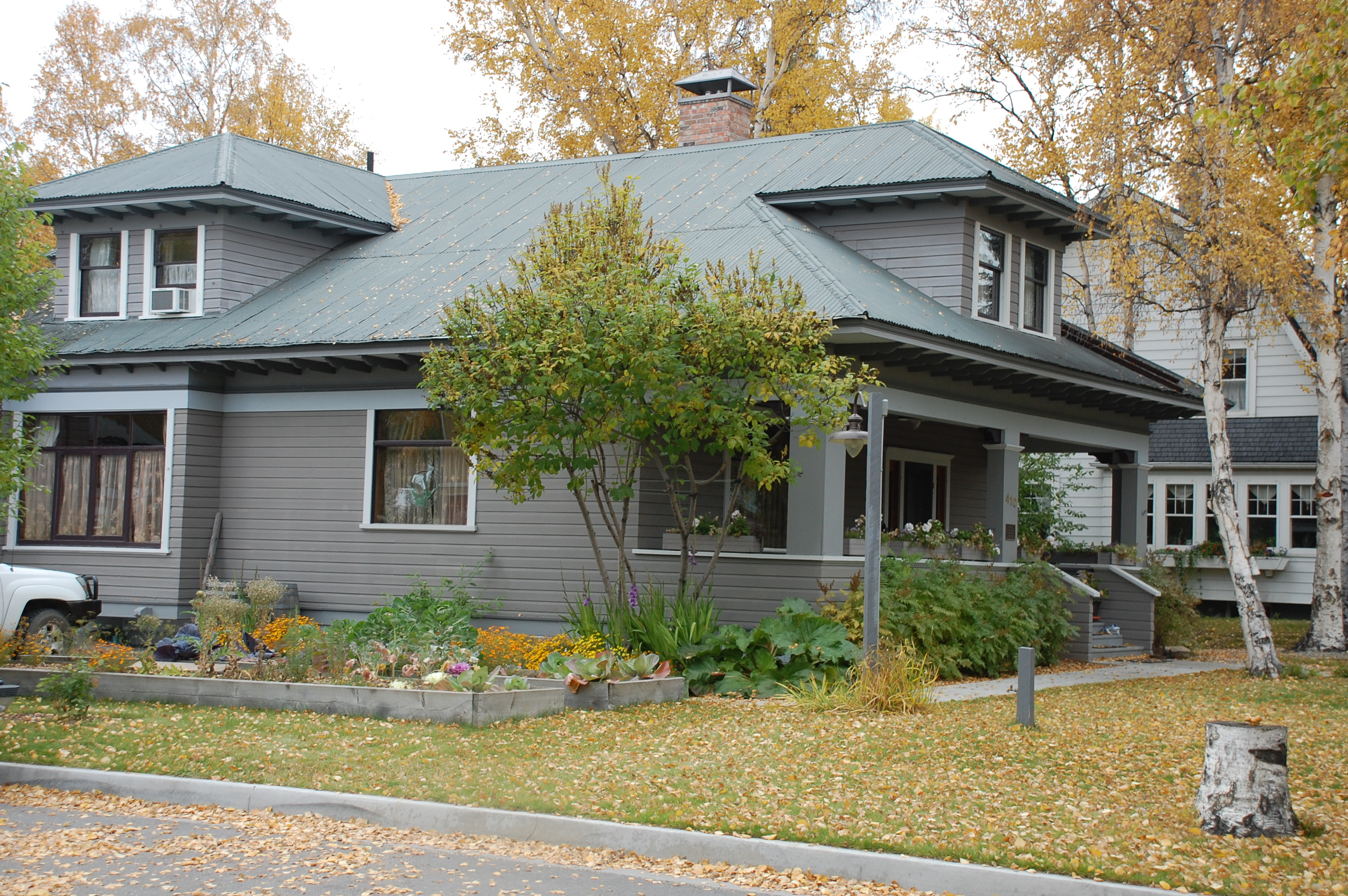

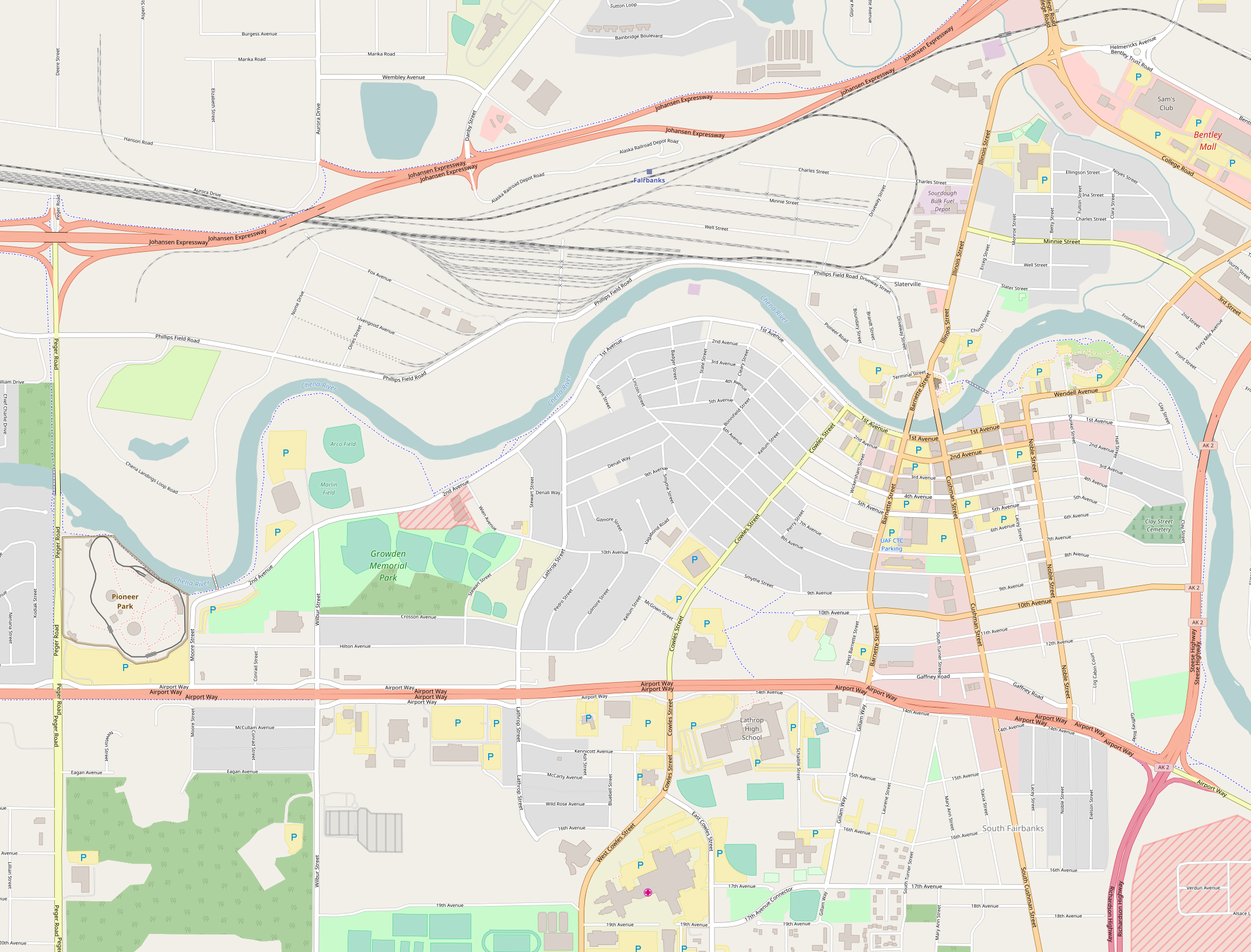
- Location within Downtown Fairbanks Location within Alaska
- Location: 410 Cowles Street, Fairbanks, Alaska
- Coordinates: 64°50′36″N 147°43′52″W
- Area: 0.2 acres (0.081 ha)
- Built: 1916
- Architectural style: Bungalow/craftsman
- NRHP reference No.: 82004901
- AHRS No.: FAI-036

Significant dates
- Added to NRHP: September 30, 1982
- Designated AHRS: November, 1978

The Mary Lee Davis House is a historic house at 410 Cowles Street in Fairbanks, Alaska. It is now the Alaska Heritage House, a bed and breakfast inn. It is a 1 1/2-story bungalow-style house, set at the northern corner of Cowles and 5th Avenue in a residential area of the city. The exact construction date of the house is uncertain: it was probably complete by 1916, but construction may have begun as early as 1906; it is acknowledged as the city's oldest occupied residence. The unfinished house was purchased by writer Mary Lee Davis and her husband, who finished the building and added a number of its distinctive touches, including the city's first residential coal heating system. After a period of ownership by the Fairbanks Exploration Company, during which it was home to company executives, it went through a succession of owners before being converted to a bed and breakfast.

The house was listed on the National Register of Historic Places in 1982.

== See also ==
- National Register of Historic Places listings in Fairbanks North Star Borough, Alaska
