= Old Federal Building (Fairbanks, Alaska) =

- Federal Building
- U.S. National Register of Historic Places
- Alaska Heritage Resources Survey
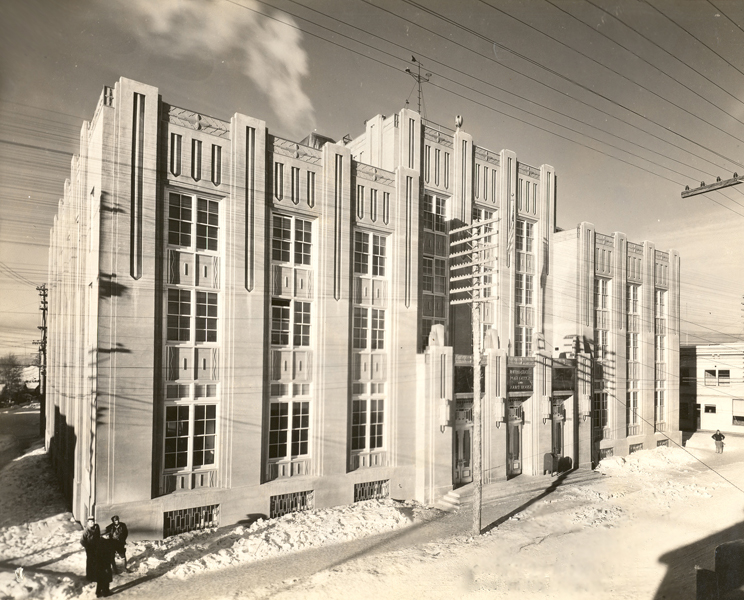
- The Federal Building, not long after its construction in 1933

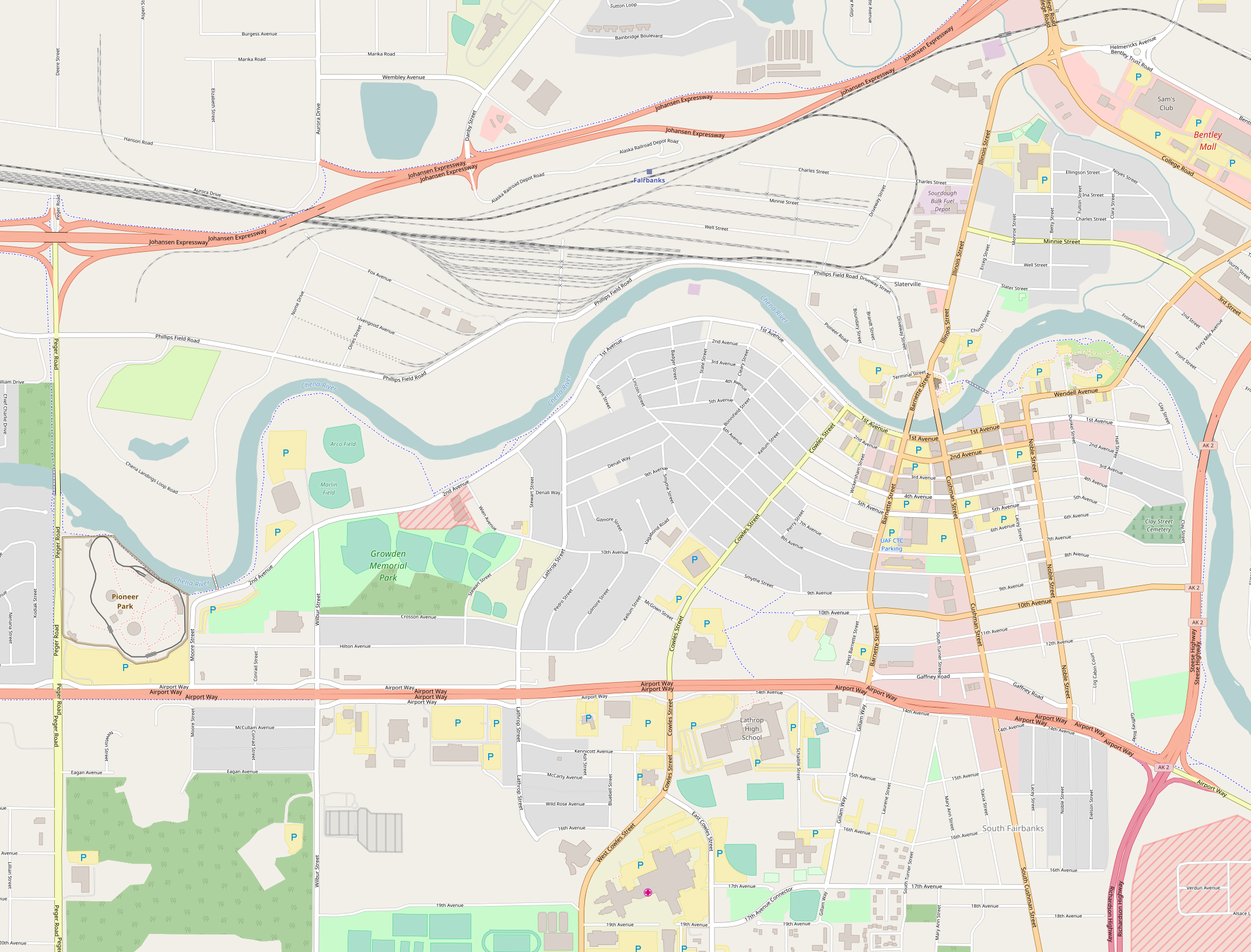
- Location within Downtown Fairbanks Location within Alaska
- Location: Cushman Street and 3rd Avenue, Fairbanks, Alaska
- Coordinates: 64°50′35″N 147°43′17″W
- Area: 0.6 acres (0.24 ha)
- Built: 1933
- Built by: US Department of the Treasury
- Architect: George N. Ray
- Architectural style: Art Deco
- NRHP reference No.: 78003422
- AHRS No.: FAI-155

Significant dates
- Added to NRHP: August 2, 1978
- Designated AHRS: February 2, 1978

The Old Federal Building is a historic government building at Cushman Street and 3rd Avenue in Fairbanks, Alaska. When it was built in 1933, it was the most northern instance of concrete construction in the United States. It is a large building with three full-height floors and two smaller penthouse levels. The building's Art Deco styling includes V-shaped grooves set in pilasters that separate columns of windows and aluminum panels. The grooves are repeated in concrete spandrels above the top row of windows. Interior decoration includes terrazzo flooring, copious use of marble in walls and floors, and a pressed copper ceiling in the courtroom. The building was designed by Washington, D.C., architect George N. Ray, and built by William "Mac" MacDonald, who also later built the Federal Building in Nome. It originally housed the federal court, post office, and other federal government offices, and the decision to locate it in Fairbanks was critical to the rise of the city's importance; it now houses private offices.

The building was listed on the National Register of Historic Places.

== See also ==
- National Register of Historic Places listings in Fairbanks North Star Borough, Alaska
