= Fairbanks Exploration Company Gold Dredge No. 5 =

- F.E. Company Gold Dredge No. 5
- U.S. National Register of Historic Places
- Alaska Heritage Resources Survey
- Location within Alaska
- Location: South bank of Upper Dome Creek, near the mouth of Seattle Creek
- Nearest city: Fairbanks, Alaska
- Coordinates: 65°1′47″N 147°34′35″W
- Area: less than one acre
- Built: 1929
- Built by: Bethlehem Steel Company
- Demolished: c. 2012
- NRHP reference No.: 04000186
- AHRS No.: LIV-00111
- Added to NRHP: March 18, 2004

The Fairbanks Exploration Company Gold Dredge No. 5 was a historic gold mining dredge in a remote area of Fairbanks North Star Borough, Alaska, north of the city of Fairbanks. It was last located on Upper Dome Creek, shortly northeast of the mouth of Seattle Creek, about 20 miles (32 km) north of Fairbanks, prior to its being scrapped c. 2012. The dredge was manufactured by the Bethlehem Steel Company in 1928, shipped in pieces to Alaska, and assembled by the Fairbanks Exploration Company on Cleary Creek, where it was used until 1942. It thereafter served on Eldorado Creek (1947–55) and Dome Creek (1955-59) before it was abandoned.

The dredge was listed on the National Register of Historic Places in 2004.

== See also ==
- National Register of Historic Places listings in Fairbanks North Star Borough, Alaska
