= Old City Hall (Fairbanks, Alaska) =

- U.S. National Register of Historic Places
- Alaska Heritage Resources Survey
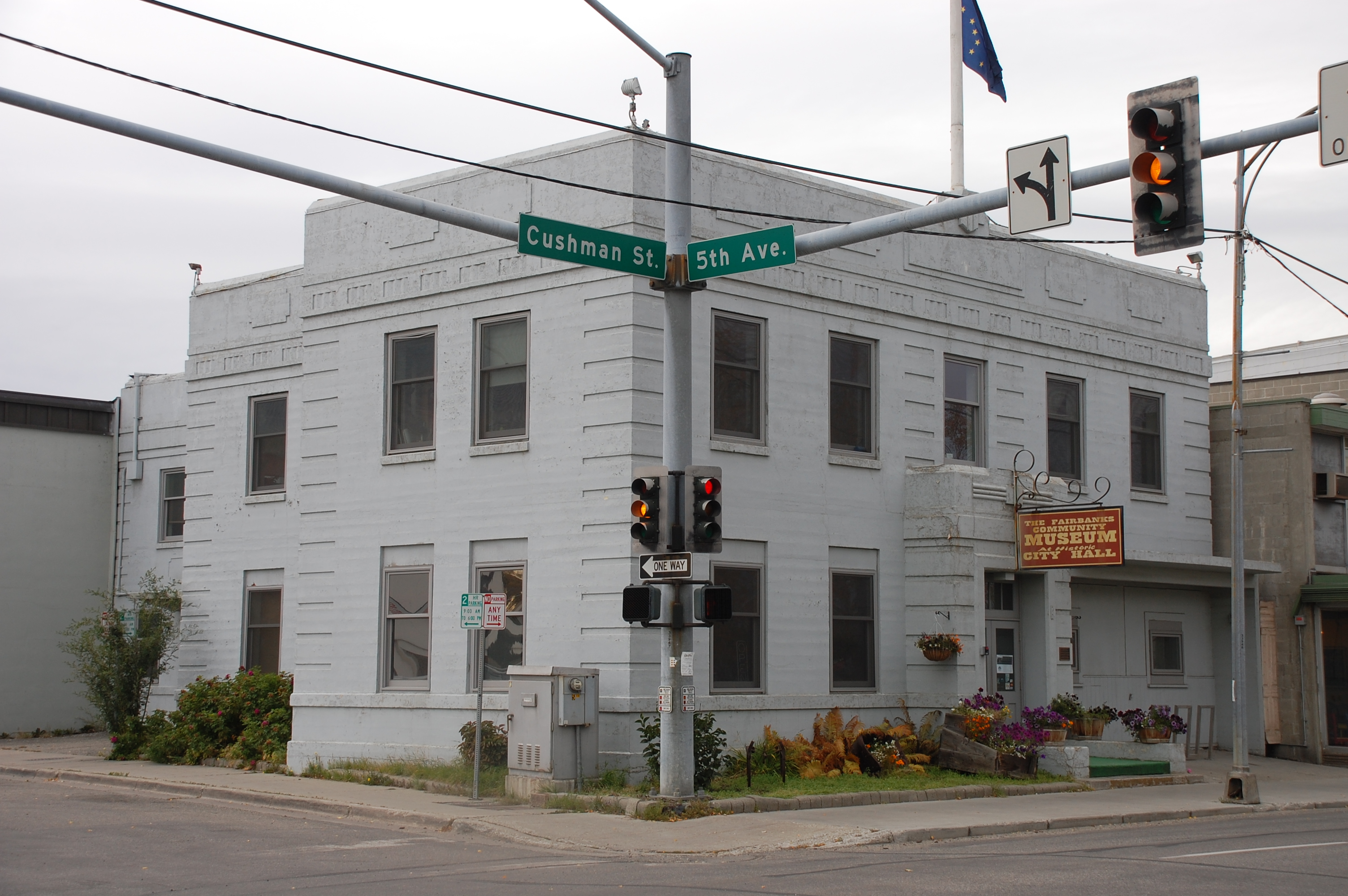
- Old City Hall in 2012

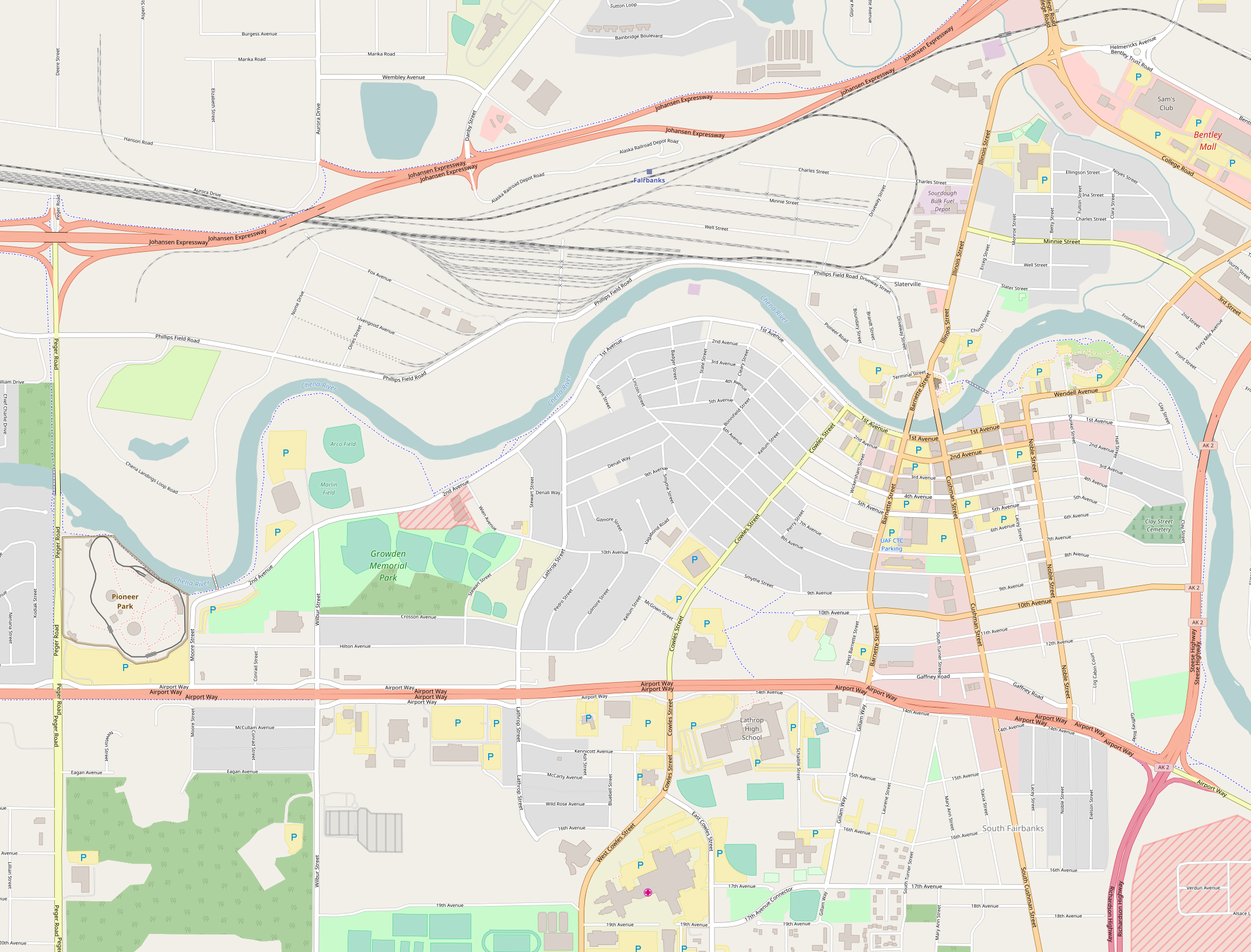
- Location within Downtown Fairbanks Location within Alaska
- Location: 410 Cushman Street, Fairbanks, Alaska
- Coordinates: 64°50′30″N 147°43′15″W
- Area: less than one acre
- Built: 1935
- Built by: Warwick Construction
- Architect: Henry Bittman
- Architectural style: Art Deco
- NRHP reference No.: 02000561
- AHRS No.: FAI-00282
- Added to NRHP: May 30, 2002

The Old City Hall, now the Fairbanks Distilling Company, is a historic civic building at 410 Cushman Street in Fairbanks, Alaska. It is a two-story Art Deco structure, built out of reinforced concrete in 1935 as a fireproof alternative to the city's previous city hall. The building is roughly T-shaped, with quoining patterns incised in the corners and bands of decoration on a parapet level. The building was originally built to house city offices as well as police and fire stations; the entrances to the fire equipment bays on Cushman Street have been filled in with wood framing and siding. The building was enlarged by extensions to the rear twice, once before 1950, and once after the 1967 floods. The city moved its offices to the adjacent Main School in 1994; the building then housed the Fairbanks Community Museum until it was acquired by Fairbanks Distilling Company in July 2014.

The building was listed on the National Register of Historic Places in 2002.

== See also ==
- National Register of Historic Places listings in Fairbanks North Star Borough, Alaska
