= Fairbanks Exploration Company Dredge No. 2 =

- F.E. Company Dredge No. 2
- U.S. National Register of Historic Places
- Alaska Heritage Resources Survey
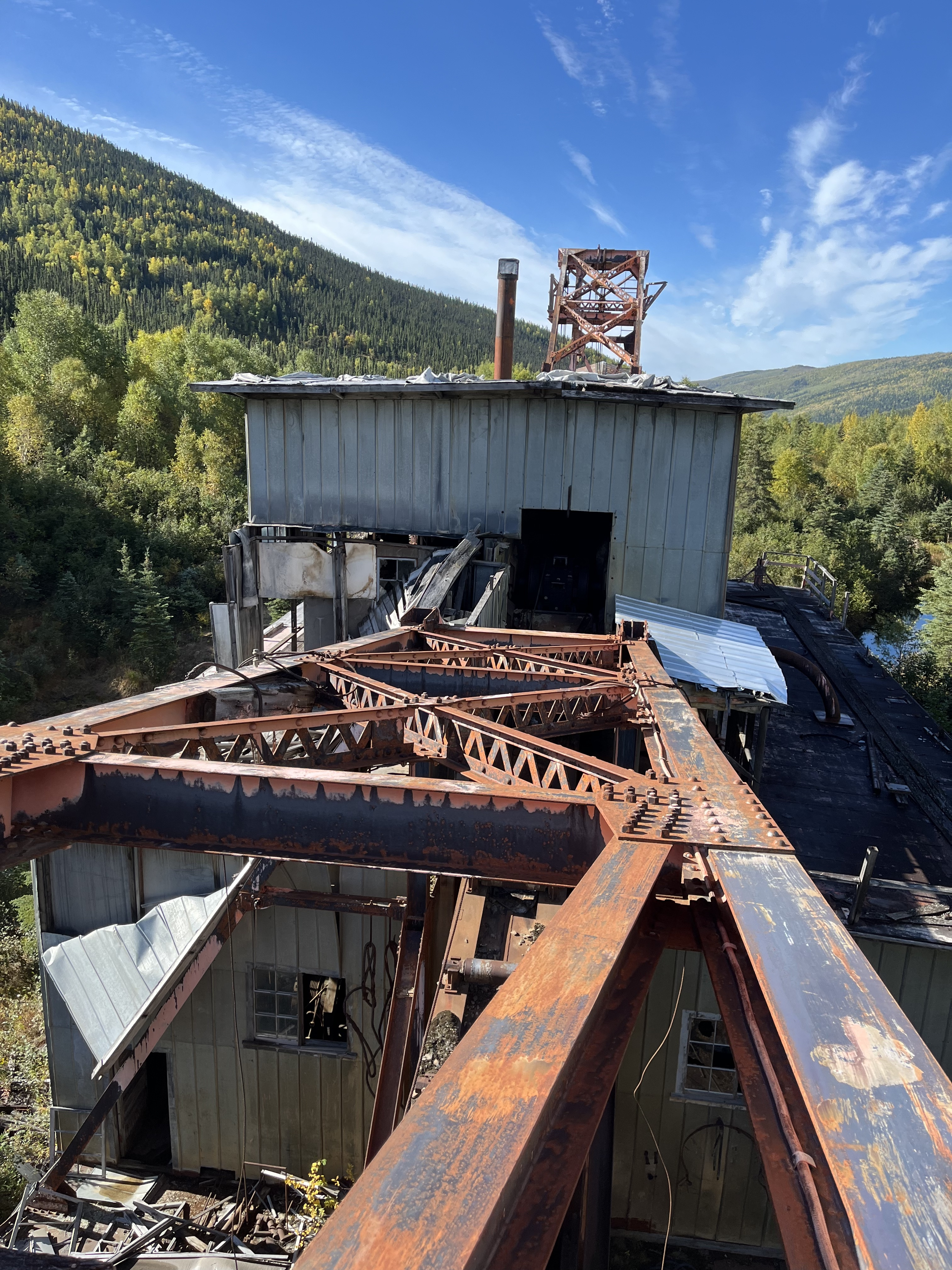
- Dredge No. 2

- Location within Alaska
- Location: North bank of Fish Creek, near the mouth of Slippery Creek
- Nearest city: Fairbanks, Alaska
- Coordinates: 65°2′35″N 147°5′37″W
- Area: less than one acre
- Built: 1928
- Built by: Bethlehem Steel Company
- NRHP reference No.: 99000763
- AHRS No.: LIV-00102
- Added to NRHP: June 30, 1999

The Fairbanks Exploration Company Dredge No. 2 is a historic gold mining dredge in a remote area of Fairbanks North Star Borough, Alaska, northeast of the city of Fairbanks. It is currently located on the north bank of Fish Creek, shortly northeast of the mouth of Slippery Creek. Its main structure is a compartmented steel hull, 128 feet (39 m) long, 60 feet (18 m) wide, and 12 feet (3.7 m) high, with a 1-2 story superstructure above made of steel and wood framing sheathed in corrugated metal. It has three gantries, and a digging ladder 112 feet (34 m) long at its bow that weights 178,000 pounds (81,000 kg). All of its original operating equipment was reported to be in place in 1999. The dredge was built in 1927 by the Bethlehem Steel Company, and assembled for use in Alaska in 1928. It was operated by the Fairbanks Exploration Company in the Goldstream Valley from 1928 to 1949, and on Fairbanks Creek and lower Fish Creek from 1950 to 1961.

== See also ==
- National Register of Historic Places listings in Fairbanks North Star Borough, Alaska
