= Masonic Temple (Fairbanks, Alaska) =

- Formerly listed on the U.S. National Register of Historic Places
- Alaska Heritage Resources Survey
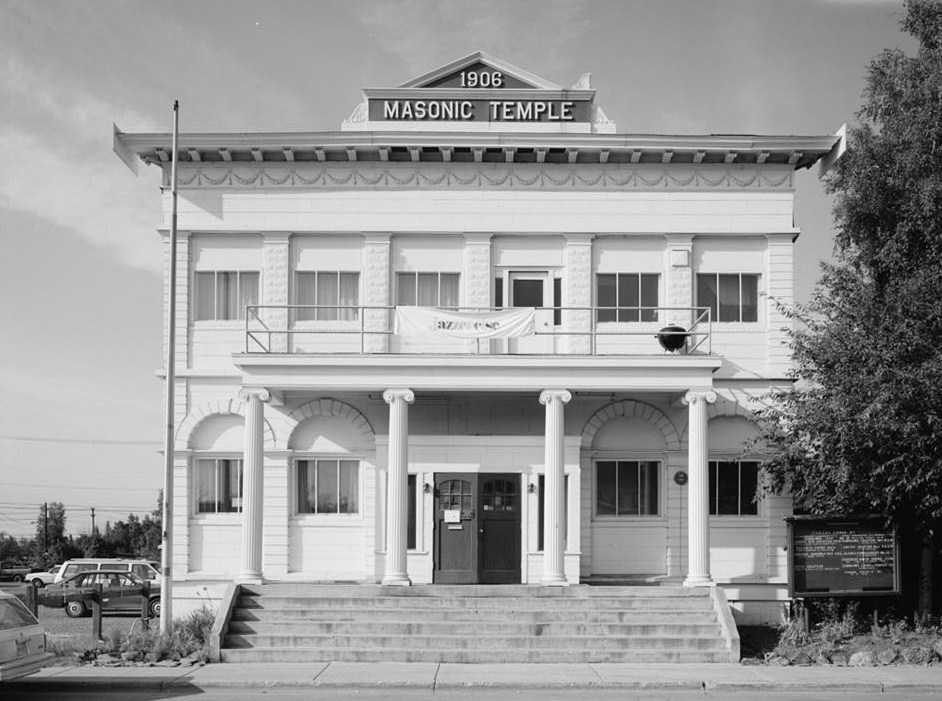
- Masonic Temple in 1991

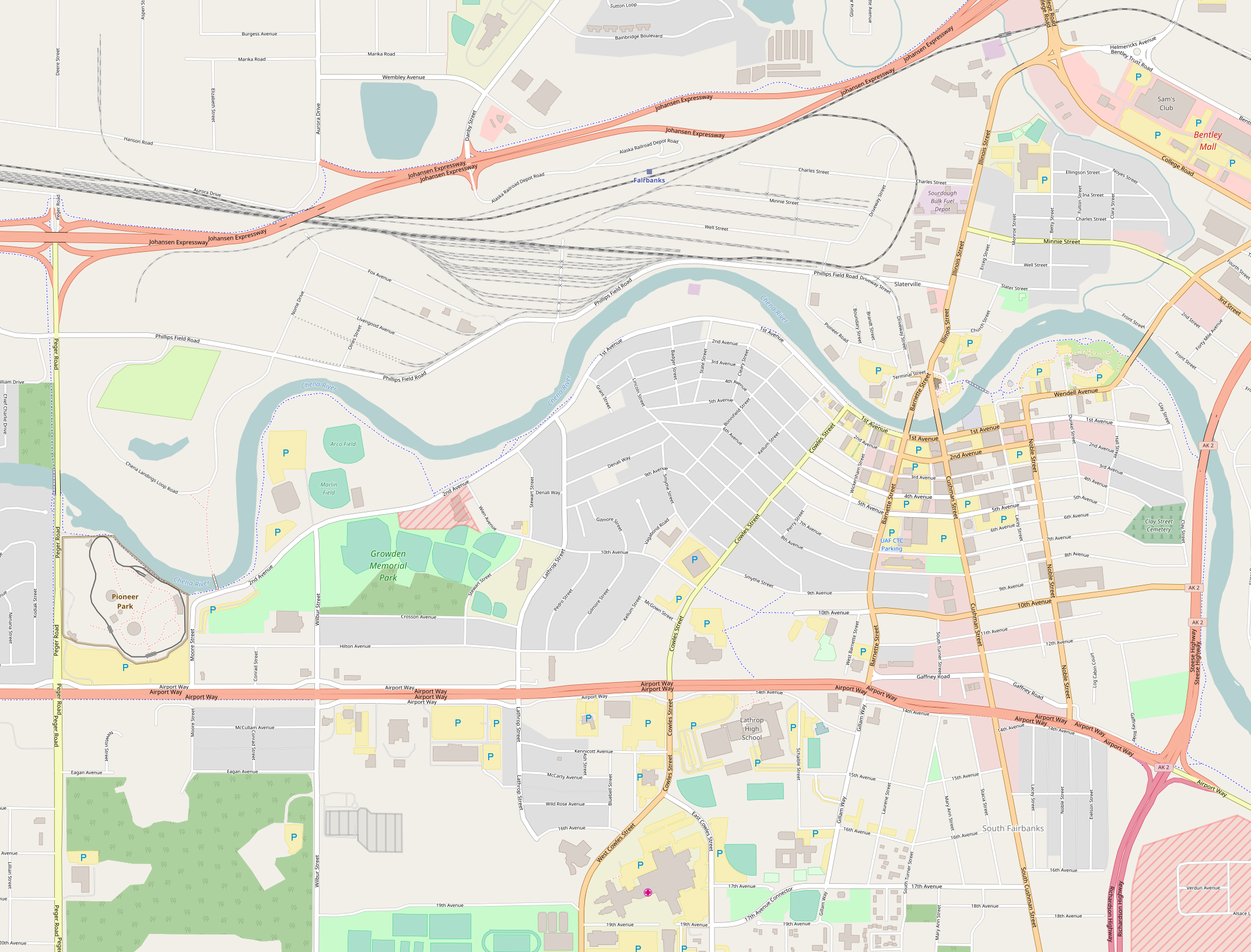
- Location within Downtown Fairbanks Location within Alaska
- Location: 809 1st Avenue, Fairbanks, Alaska
- Coordinates: 64°50′39″N 147°43′36″W
- Area: 0.9 acres (0.36 ha)
- Built: 1906
- Architectural style: Eclectic Renaissance Revival
- NRHP reference No.: 80004568
- AHRS No.: FAI-032

Significant dates
- Added to NRHP: June 3, 1980
- Designated AHRS: 1978
- Removed from NRHP: August 16, 2018

The Masonic Temple was a historic two-story wooden building at 809 1st Avenue, near the Chena River in Fairbanks, Alaska. It was built in 1906, expanded in 1908, and further altered in 1913 and 1916. Its architecture was "eclectic Renaissance Revival", a style that had been popular in the "lower 48" United States in the 1880s and 1890s. It was listed on the National Register of Historic Places in 1980.

The building was originally constructed for the Tanana Commercial Company in 1906. The fire that destroyed much of the city that same year did not affect it, as the fire stopped about one block away.

In 1908, the Tanana Lodge No. 3, a Masonic group that had started as a club in 1904 and received a charter in 1908, purchased the building. The Masons added an extension in the rear for lodge rooms and a main hall in 1908. The building was raised in 1913 and a new facade was added in 1916. The Masons no longer meet in the building.

President Warren G. Harding gave a speech from the steps of the Masonic Temple during his visit to Alaska in 1923.

The roof of the vacant building collapsed on March 17, 2018, and the rest of the building was demolished the next day. It was delisted from the National Register in August 2018.

== See also ==
- National Register of Historic Places listings in Fairbanks North Star Borough, Alaska
