= Chena Pump House =

- U.S. National Register of Historic Places
- Alaska Heritage Resources Survey
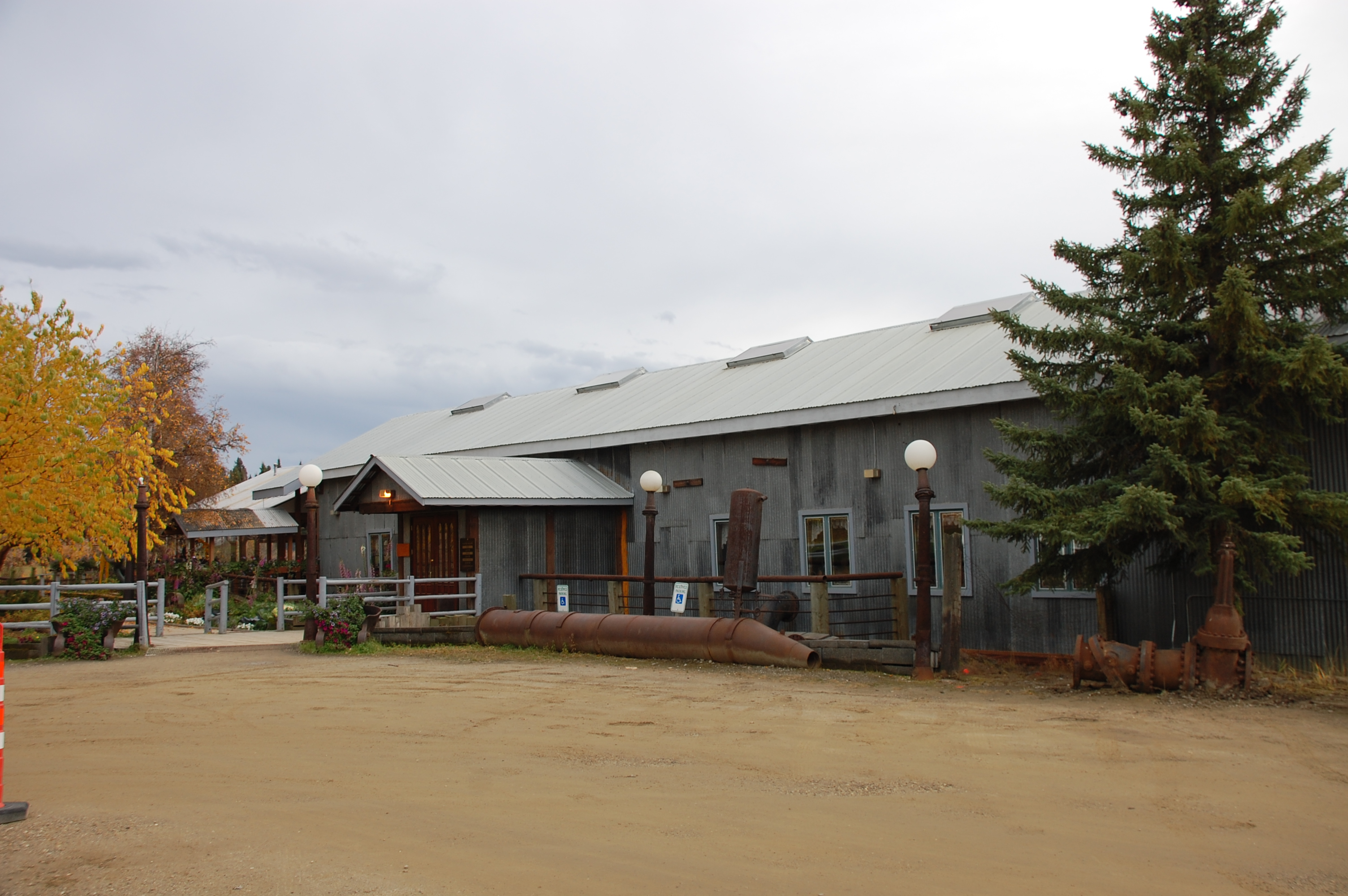

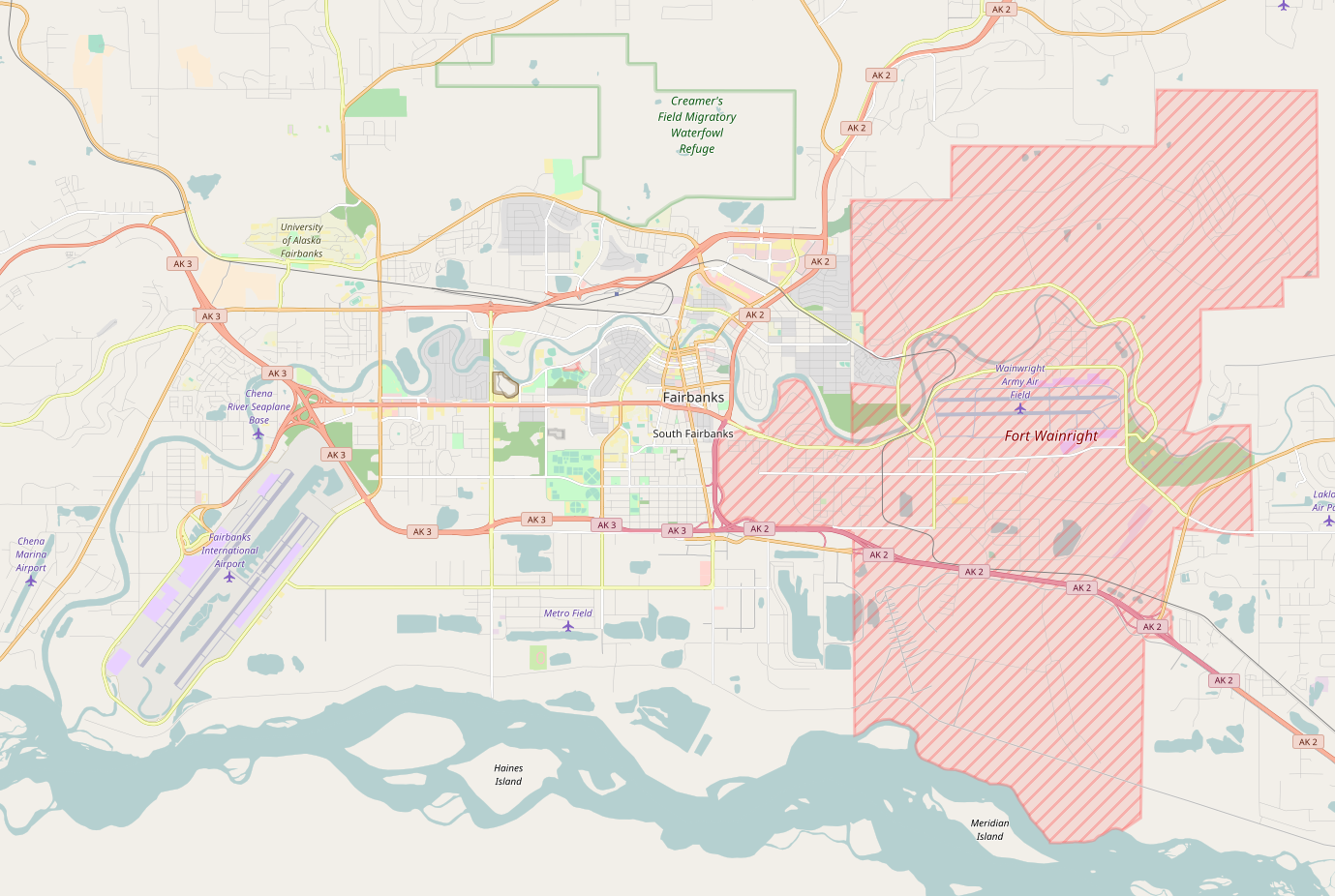
- Location within Fairbanks Location within Alaska
- Location: 796 Chena Pump Road, Fairbanks, Alaska
- Coordinates: 64°49′53″N 147°53′5″W
- Area: 3 acres (1.2 ha)
- Built: 1933
- Built by: Fairbanks Exploration Company
- NRHP reference No.: 82004900
- AHRS No.: FAI-202

Significant dates
- Added to NRHP: March 17, 1982
- Designated AHRS: February 20, 1980

The Chena Pump House, also known just as the Pump House Restaurant, is a restaurant at 796 Chena Pump Road in Fairbanks, Alaska. The restaurant is located in the shell of a 1933 pumping station established by the Fairbanks Exploration Company, Alaska's largest gold mining operator at the time. The pump house was used to provide water to dredges operating on Cripple Creek in the Ester area. The building was abandoned by the company in 1958, and was enlarged and converted into a restaurant in 1978. It was listed on the National Register of Historic Places in 1982.

== See also ==
- National Register of Historic Places listings in Fairbanks North Star Borough, Alaska
