= Rose Building (Fairbanks, Alaska) =

- U.S. National Register of Historic Places
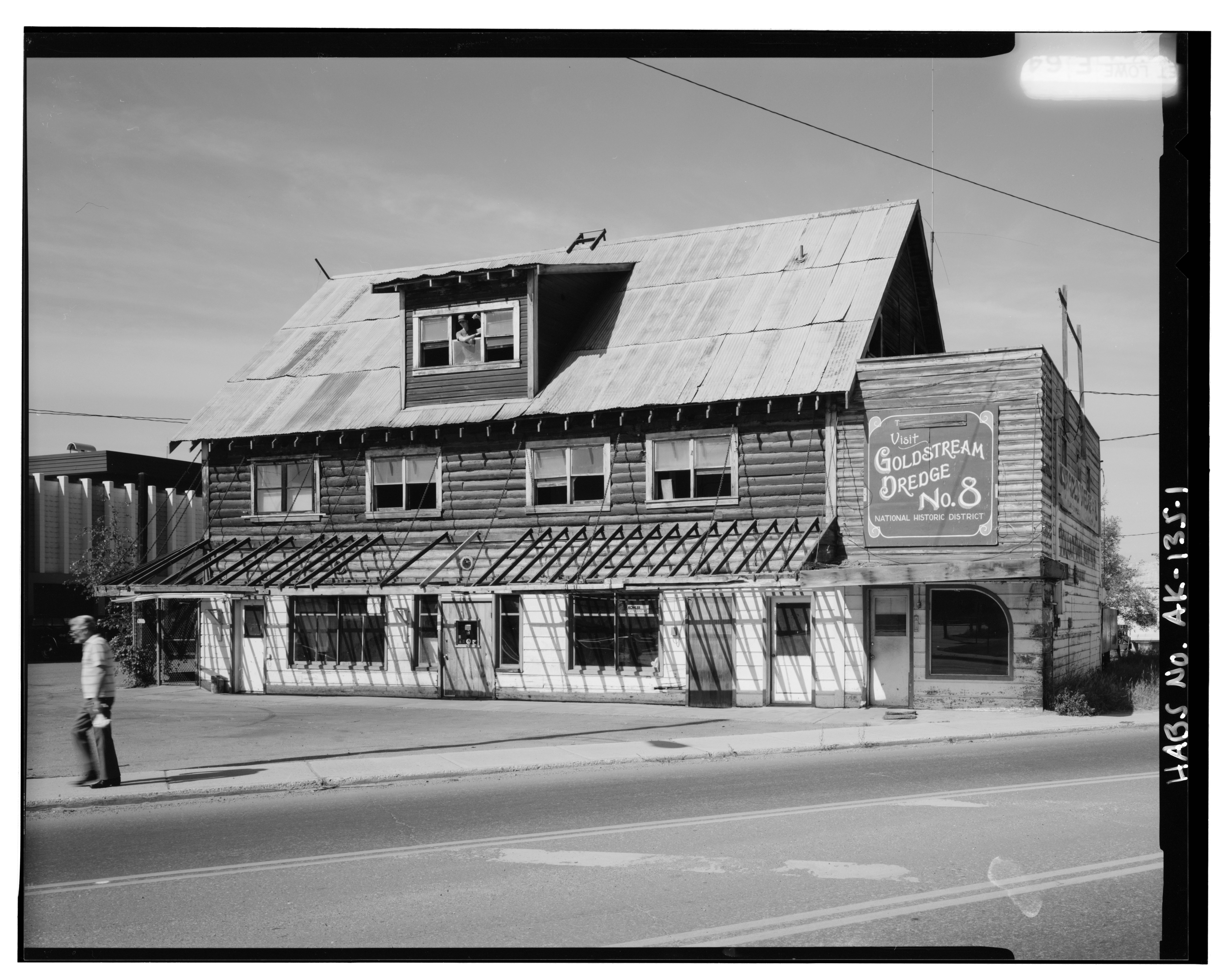

- Location within Alaska
- Location: Illinois and Church Streets, Fairbanks, Alaska
- Coordinates: 64°50′47″N 147°43′09″W
- Area: less than one acre
- Built: c.1912
- NRHP reference No.: 92000444
- Added to NRHP: May 11, 1992

The Rose Building was a historic commercial building in Fairbanks, Alaska. It was located on the west side of Illinois Street (prior to its 1990s realignment), north of the offices of the Fairbanks Daily News-Miner, and was a three-story log structure, capped by a steeply pitched gable roof. It is believed to have been built about 1912 in the mining community of Chena, and was moved to Fairbanks in 1925. It was named for Louis Rose, who purchased the building in 1938. It was, at the time of its demolition, the oldest commercial log building in the city, and was listed on the National Register of Historic Places in 1992. It was demolished in 1998 as part of the Illinois Street roadworks.

== See also ==
- National Register of Historic Places listings in Fairbanks North Star Borough, Alaska
