= Oddfellows Hall (Fairbanks, Alaska) =

- U.S. National Register of Historic Places
- Alaska Heritage Resources Survey
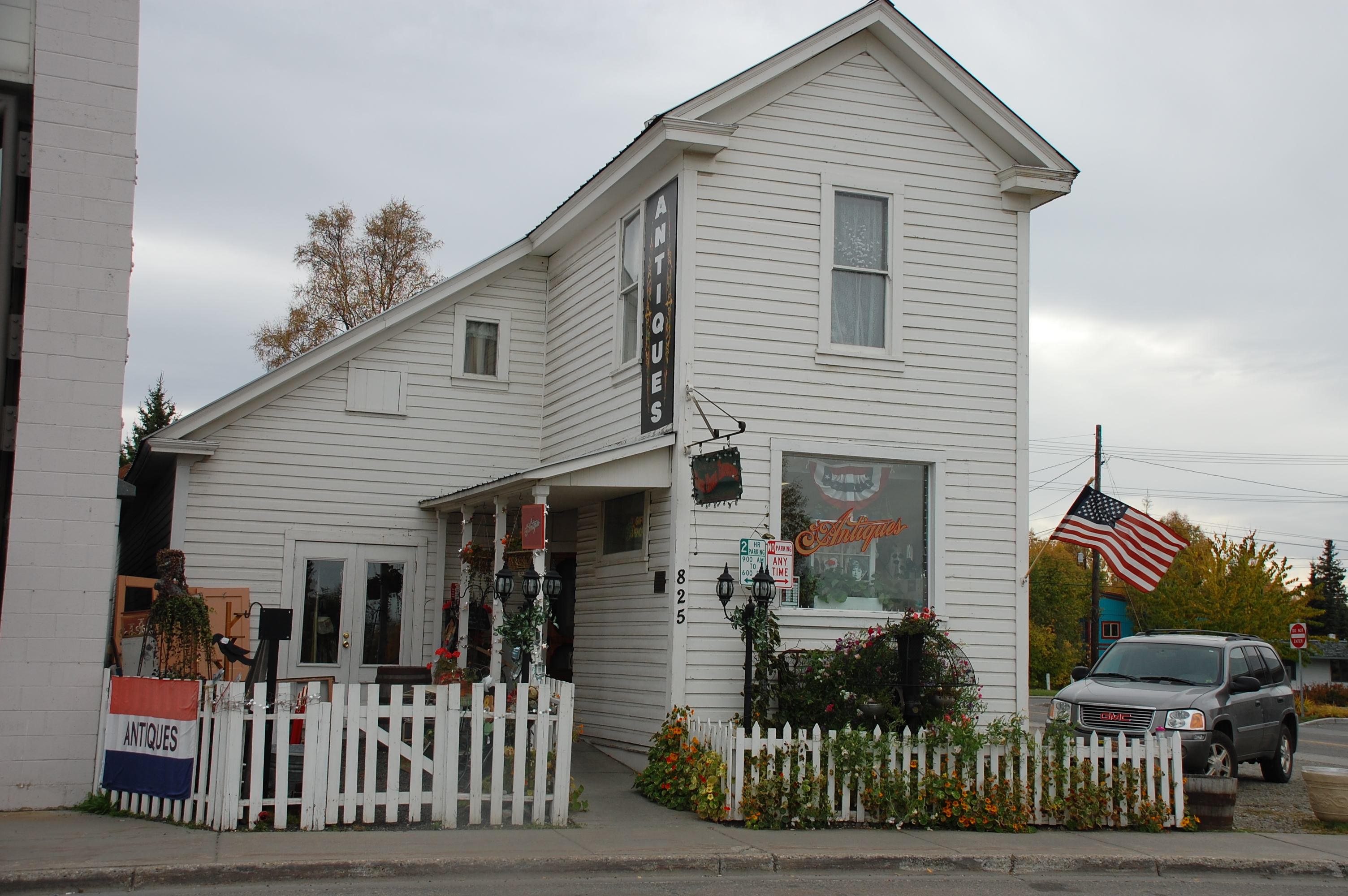

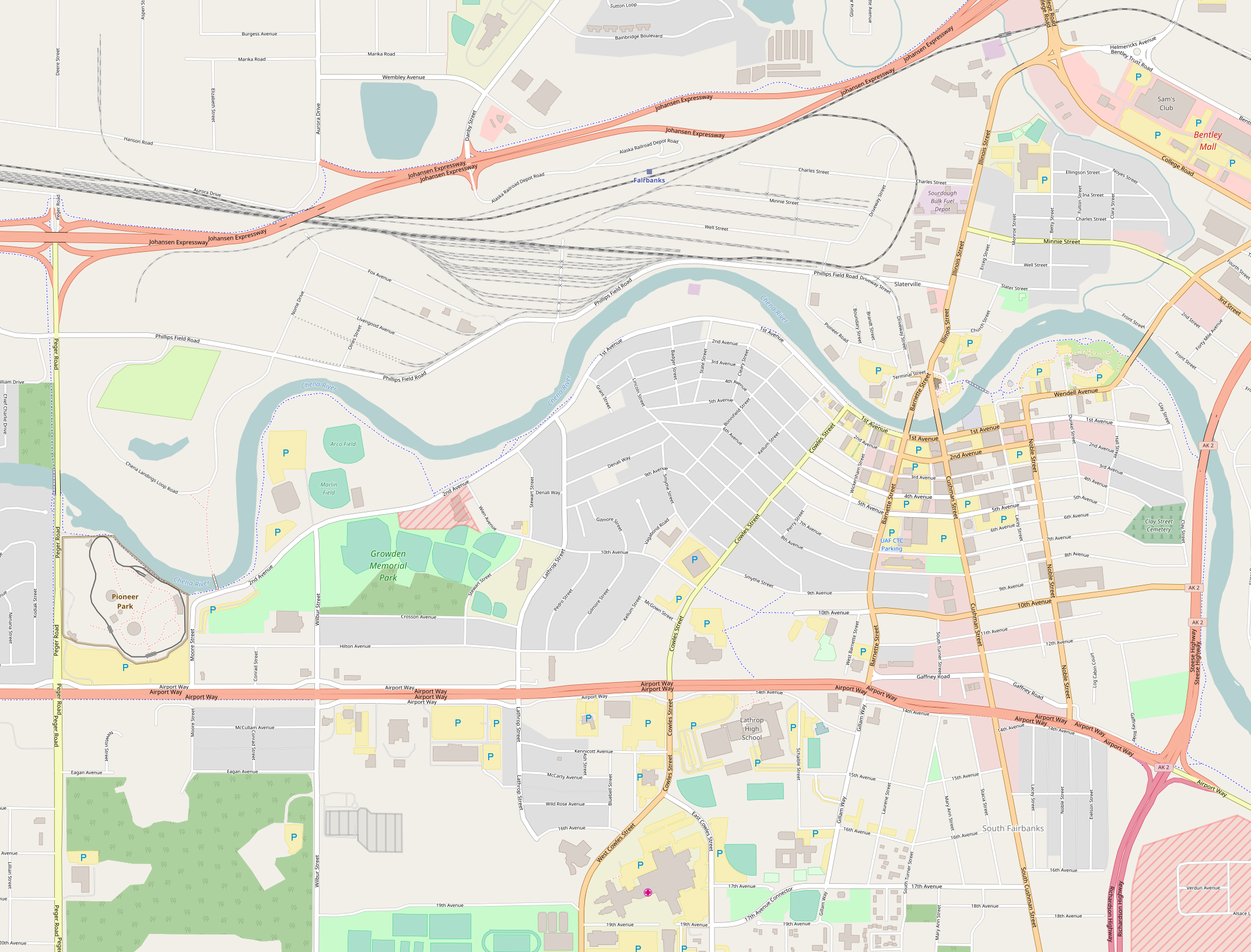
- Location within Downtown Fairbanks Location within Alaska
- Location: 825 1st Avenue, Fairbanks, Alaska
- Coordinates: 64°50′40″N 147°43′39″W
- Area: Less than one acre
- Built: 1907
- NRHP reference No.: 80004569
- AHRS No.: FAI-038

Significant dates
- Added to NRHP: June 3, 1980
- Designated AHRS: February 2, 1977

The Oddfellows House, also known as Oddfellows Hall, is a former fraternal clubhouse of Oddfellows at 825 1st Avenue in Fairbanks, Alaska. It is a wood-frame building with two sections, the front one a narrow two-story structure, the rear one a wider single-story structure. Each section has its own gable roof, although they do briefly align. The building was built in 1907 by Madame Renio, a fortune teller, and initially housed a clinic and residential space in the front and a bathhouse in the rear. The bathhouse business failed after its pipes froze in the winter of 1909–10, and the building was purchased by the local chapter of the International Order of Odd Fellows (IOOF). This fraternal organization converted the front space into a kitchen and bathroom, and the rear was converted into a large meeting hall. Under the IOOF's ownership the hall was used by a wide variety of civic and religious organizations, including its sister organization, the Golden North Rebekahs. The IOOF chapter was inactive between the late 1930s and 1945, but the Rebekahs continued to maintain the building, eventually taking ownership in 1967. The Rebekahs disbanded in 2007, and the space was briefly used as a museum; it now houses a retail establishment.

The building was listed on the National Register of Historic Places in 1980.

== See also ==
- National Register of Historic Places listings in Fairbanks North Star Borough, Alaska
