= Wickersham House (Fairbanks, Alaska) =

Historic house in Alaska, United States

- U.S. National Register of Historic Places
- Alaska Heritage Resources Survey
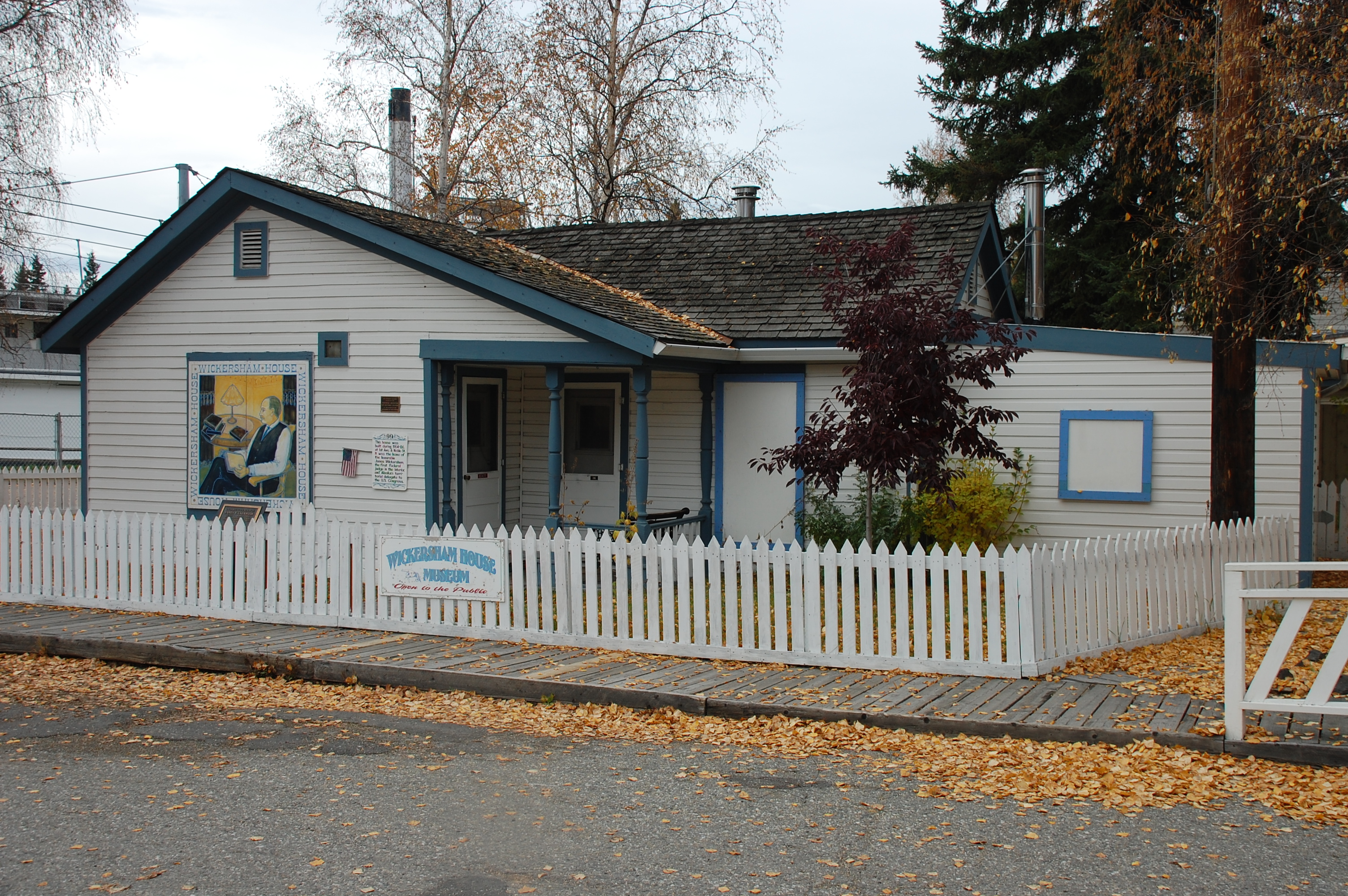

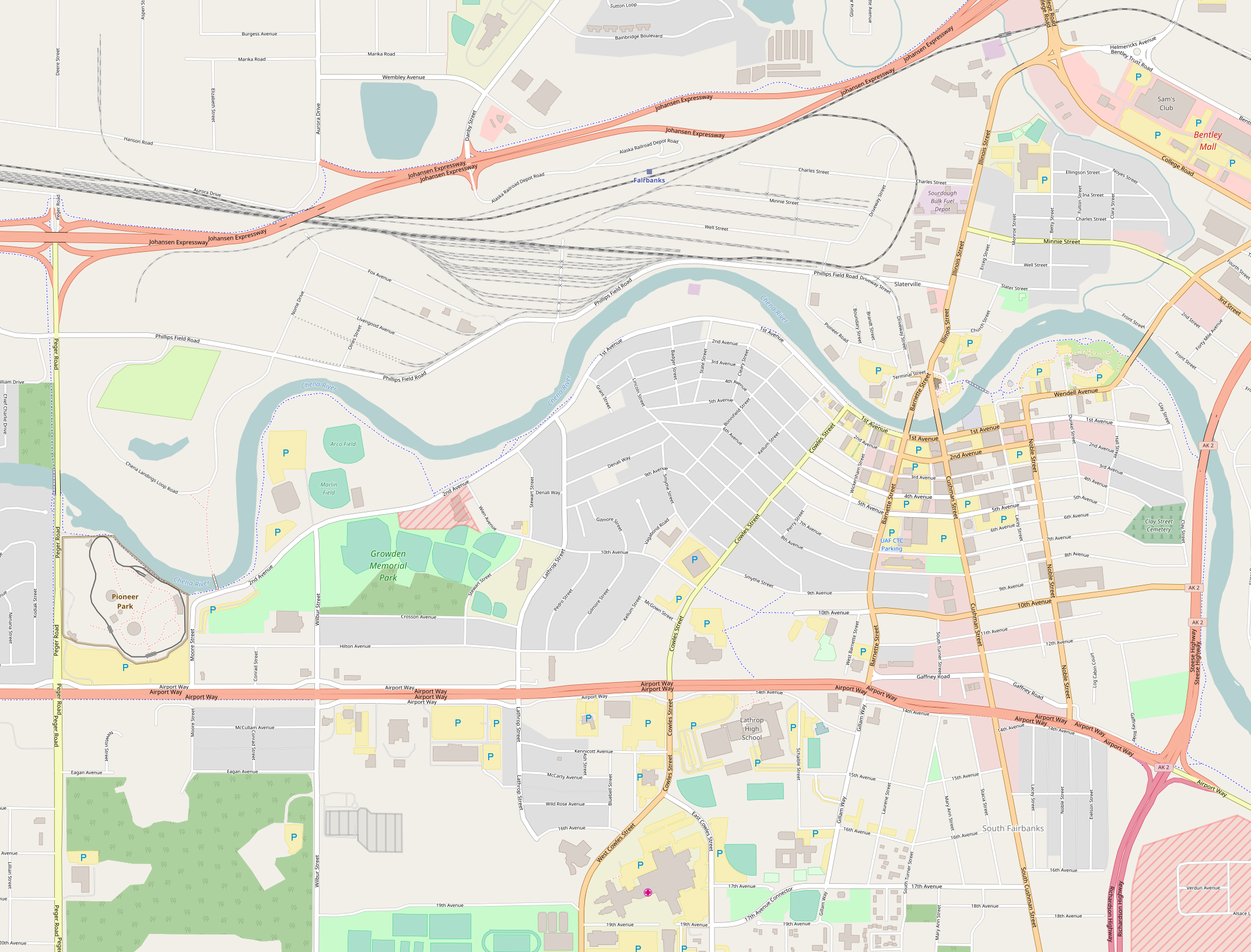
- Location within Downtown Fairbanks Location within Alaska
- Location: Pioneer Park, Fairbanks, Alaska
- Coordinates: 64°50′19″N 147°46′17″W
- Area: less than one acre
- Built: 1904
- NRHP reference No.: 79003757
- AHRS No.: FAI-139

Significant dates
- Added to NRHP: April 27, 1979
- Designated AHRS: June 30, 1974

The Wickersham House is a historic house museum at Pioneer Park ("Alaskaland") in Fairbanks, Alaska. The single-story wood-frame house was built in 1904 for James Wickersham, one of the dominant political figures of early 20th-century Alaskan history. It was the first frame house (and at three rooms the largest) built in Fairbanks, and the first to feature a wooden sidewalk, picket fence, and grass lawn. The house was the first designated state landmark, designated by Governor Walter J. Hickel in May 1966. The house was rescued from demolition by the Fairbanks chapter of the Pioneers of Alaska, and moved from its original site at First and Noble Streets to the newly formed Alaskaland park in 1967. It is now a museum operated by the Tanana-Yukon Historical Society.

The house was listed on the National Register of Historic Places in 1979.

== See also ==
- National Register of Historic Places listings in Fairbanks North Star Borough, Alaska
