= National Register of Historic Places listings in Fairbanks North Star Borough, Alaska =

Location of the Fairbanks North Star Borough in Alaska.

This is a list of the National Register of Historic Places listings in Fairbanks North Star Borough, Alaska.

This is intended to be a complete list of the properties and districts on the National Register of Historic Places in Fairbanks North Star Borough, Alaska, United States. The locations of National Register properties and districts for which the latitude and longitude coordinates are included below, may be seen in an online map.

There are 35 properties and districts listed on the National Register in the borough, including three National Historic Landmarks.

This National Park Service list is complete through NPS recent listings posted July 17, 2026.

== Current listings ==
	Name on the Register	Image	Date listed	Location	City or town	Description
1	Chatanika Gold Camp	Chatanika Gold Camp	October 16, 1979 (#79003753)	Mile 27¾ on the Steese Highway; 65°06′42″N 147°28′49″W	Chatanika	
2	Chena Building		December 12, 2024 (#100011138)	Chena River State Recreation Site. Mile 8 Chena Pump Road; 64°47′43″N 147°57′10″W	Fairbanks	
3	Chena Pump House	Chena Pump House	March 17, 1982 (#82004900)	796 Chena Pump Road; 64°49′53″N 147°53′05″W	Fairbanks	
4	Chugwater Site		November 23, 1979 (#79003754)	On Moose Creek Bluff, 35 kilometres (22 mi) southeast of Fairbanks; 64°41′30″N 147°13′05″W	North Pole	
5	Old City Hall	Old City Hall	May 30, 2002 (#02000561)	410 Cushman Street; 64°50′30″N 147°43′15″W	Fairbanks	
6	Clay Street Cemetery	Clay Street Cemetery	October 25, 1982 (#82001619)	7th Avenue and Clay Street; 64°50′30″N 147°42′27″W	Fairbanks	
7	Constitution Hall	Constitution Hall	November 3, 2005 (#05001196)	University of Alaska Fairbanks campus 64°51′27″N 147°49′19″W	Fairbanks	
8	Mary Lee Davis House	Mary Lee Davis House	September 30, 1982 (#82004901)	410 Cowles Street; 64°50′36″N 147°43′52″W	Fairbanks	
9	Discovery Claim on Pedro Creek	Discovery Claim on Pedro Creek	May 13, 1992 (#92000498)	Mile 16.5 on the Steese Highway; 65°00′32″N 147°29′51″W	Fairbanks	
10	Ester Camp Historic District	Ester Camp Historic District	May 6, 1987 (#87000703)	Off Alaska Route 3; 64°50′48″N 148°01′10″W	Ester	
11	F.E. Company Housing	F.E. Company Housing	May 9, 1997 (#97000400)	505, 507, 521, and 523 Illinois Street; 64°51′02″N 147°43′06″W	Fairbanks	
12	F.E. Company Machine Shop	F.E. Company Machine Shop	October 12, 1995 (#95001164)	behind 612 Illinois Street; 64°51′07″N 147°43′20″W	Fairbanks	
13	F.E. Company Manager's House	F.E. Company Manager's House	February 16, 1996 (#96000095)	757 Illinois Street; 64°51′11″N 147°42′58″W	Fairbanks	
14	F.E. Company Dredge No. 2	F.E. Company Dredge No. 2	June 30, 1999 (#99000763)	Fish Creek; 65°02′35″N 147°05′37″W	Fairbanks	
15	F.E. Company Gold Dredge No. 5		March 18, 2004 (#04000186)	Upper Dome Creek; 65°01′47″N 147°34′35″W	Fairbanks	Scrapped c. 2012.
16	Federal Building	Federal Building	August 2, 1978 (#78003422)	250 Cushman Street; 64°50′35″N 147°43′17″W	Fairbanks	
17	Goldstream Dredge No. 8	Goldstream Dredge No. 8	February 28, 1984 (#84000637)	1755 Old Steese Highway North; 64°56′14″N 147°39′28″W	Fairbanks	
18	Gould Cabin		August 12, 2021 (#100006828)	105 Dunkel St. 64°50′45″N 147°42′48″W	Fairbanks	
19	Growden Memorial Ballpark	Growden Memorial Ballpark	June 16, 2025 (#100011920)	207 Wilbur Street; 64°50′25″N 147°45′35″W	Fairbanks	
20	Harding Railroad Car	Harding Railroad Car	April 6, 1978 (#78003423)	Pioneer Park, 2300 Airport Way; 64°50′17″N 147°46′20″W	Fairbanks	Pullman passenger-observation car Denali (Alaska Railroad No. X-336)
21	Hinckley-Creamer Dairy	Hinckley-Creamer Dairy	April 13, 1977 (#77001572)	At end of Creamer Lane, in Creamer's Field Migratory Waterfowl Refuge; 64°51′51″N 147°44′16″W	Fairbanks	
22	Illinois Street Historic District	Illinois Street Historic District	September 14, 2001 (#01000966)	300-700 Illinois Street; 64°50′59″N 147°43′12″W	Fairbanks	
23	Immaculate Conception Church	Immaculate Conception Church	April 3, 1976 (#76002278)	115 North Cushman Street; 64°50′43″N 147°43′18″W	Fairbanks	
24	Falcon Joslin House	Falcon Joslin House	April 29, 1980 (#80004567)	413 Cowles Street; 64°50′35″N 147°43′49″W	Fairbanks	
25	Lacey Street Theatre	Lacey Street Theatre	June 14, 1990 (#90000878)	504 Second Avenue; 64°50′38″N 147°43′04″W	Fairbanks	
26	Ladd Field	Ladd Field	February 4, 1985 (#85002730)	Fort Wainwright; 64°49′54″N 147°36′58″W	Fairbanks	
27	Main School	Main School	September 27, 1990 (#90001472)	800 Cushman Street; 64°50′23″N 147°43′16″W	Fairbanks	Now Fairbanks City Hall.
28	Nenana (steamer)	Nenana (steamer)	June 27, 1972 (#72001581)	Pioneer Park, 2300 Airport Way; 64°50′19″N 147°46′20″W	Fairbanks	
29	Oddfellows Hall	Oddfellows Hall	June 3, 1980 (#80004569)	825 First Avenue; 64°50′40″N 147°43′39″W	Fairbanks	
30	Pike's Landing		July 14, 2025 (#100011912)	1850 Hoselton Rd. 64°49′49″N 147°50′51″W	Fairbanks	
31	Rainey's Cabin	Rainey's Cabin	November 20, 1975 (#75002158)	University of Alaska campus 64°51′32″N 147°49′54″W	College	
32	Rose Building	Rose Building	May 11, 1992 (#92000444)	Illinois and Church Streets; 64°50′47″N 147°43′20″W	Fairbanks	Building demolished in 1998, before the start of urban improvements to Illinois Street; mitigation for the removal of the building was used to restore other historical properties in Fairbanks. AHRS# FAI-280
33	St. Matthew's Episcopal Church	St. Matthew's Episcopal Church	February 12, 2016 (#16000001)	1029 First Avenue; 64°50′45″N 147°43′51″W	Fairbanks	AHRS# FAI-00110
34	George C. Thomas Memorial Library	George C. Thomas Memorial Library	February 23, 1972 (#72001542)	901 First Avenue; 64°50′41″N 147°43′41″W	Fairbanks	
35	Wickersham House	Wickersham House	April 27, 1979 (#79003757)	Pioneer Park, 2300 Airport Way; 64°50′19″N 147°46′17″W	Fairbanks	

== Former listings ==
	Name on the Register	Image	Date listed	Date removed	Location	City or town	Description
1	Masonic Temple	Masonic Temple	June 3, 1980 (#80004568)	August 16, 2018	809 First Avenue; 64°50′39″N 147°43′36″W	Fairbanks	Roof collapsed on March 17, 2018, and the remainder was demolished the next day.

== See also ==
- List of National Historic Landmarks in Alaska
- National Register of Historic Places listings in Alaska
