= Falcon Joslin House =

Historic house in Alaska, United States

- U.S. National Register of Historic Places
- Alaska Heritage Resources Survey
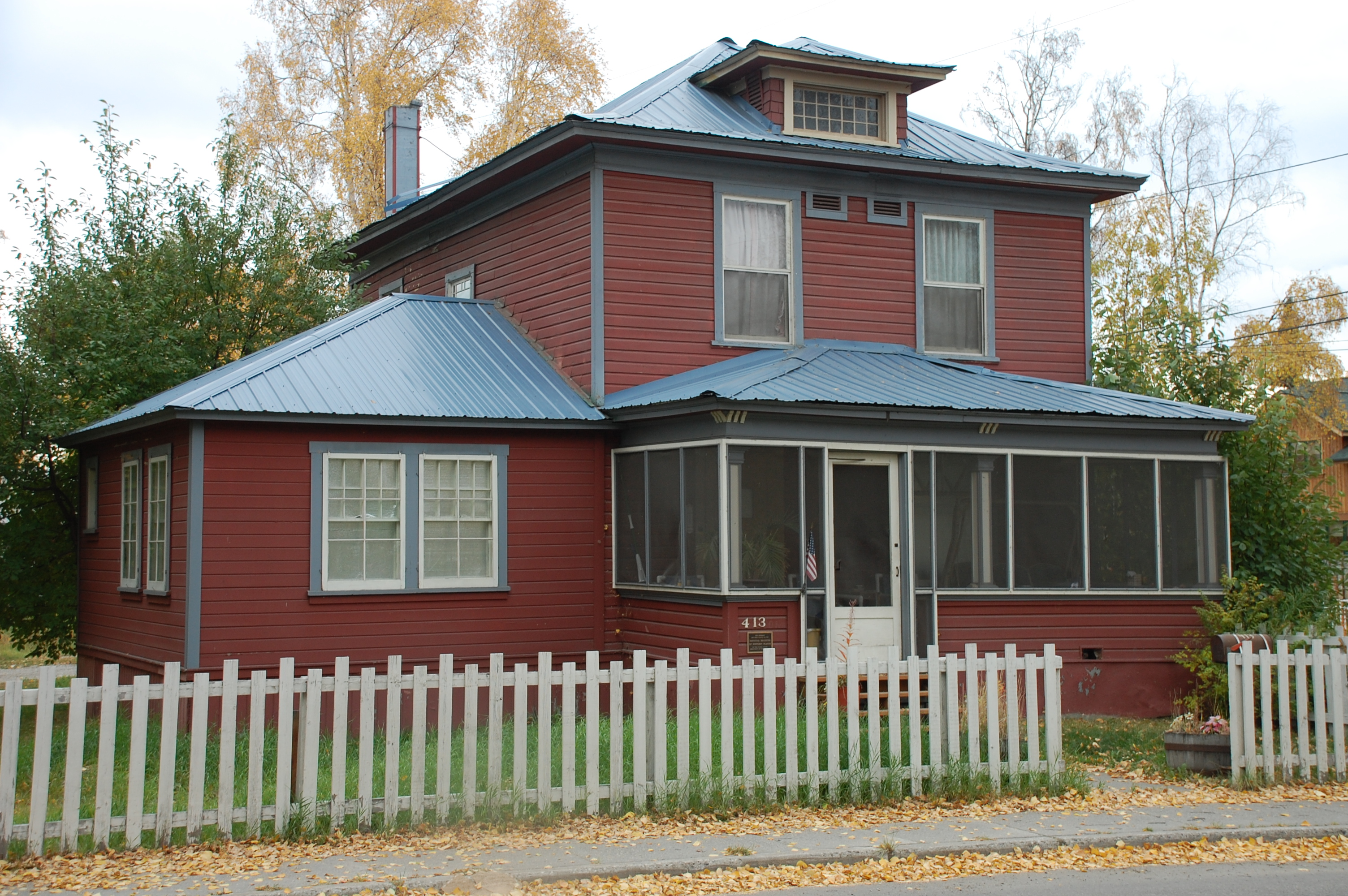

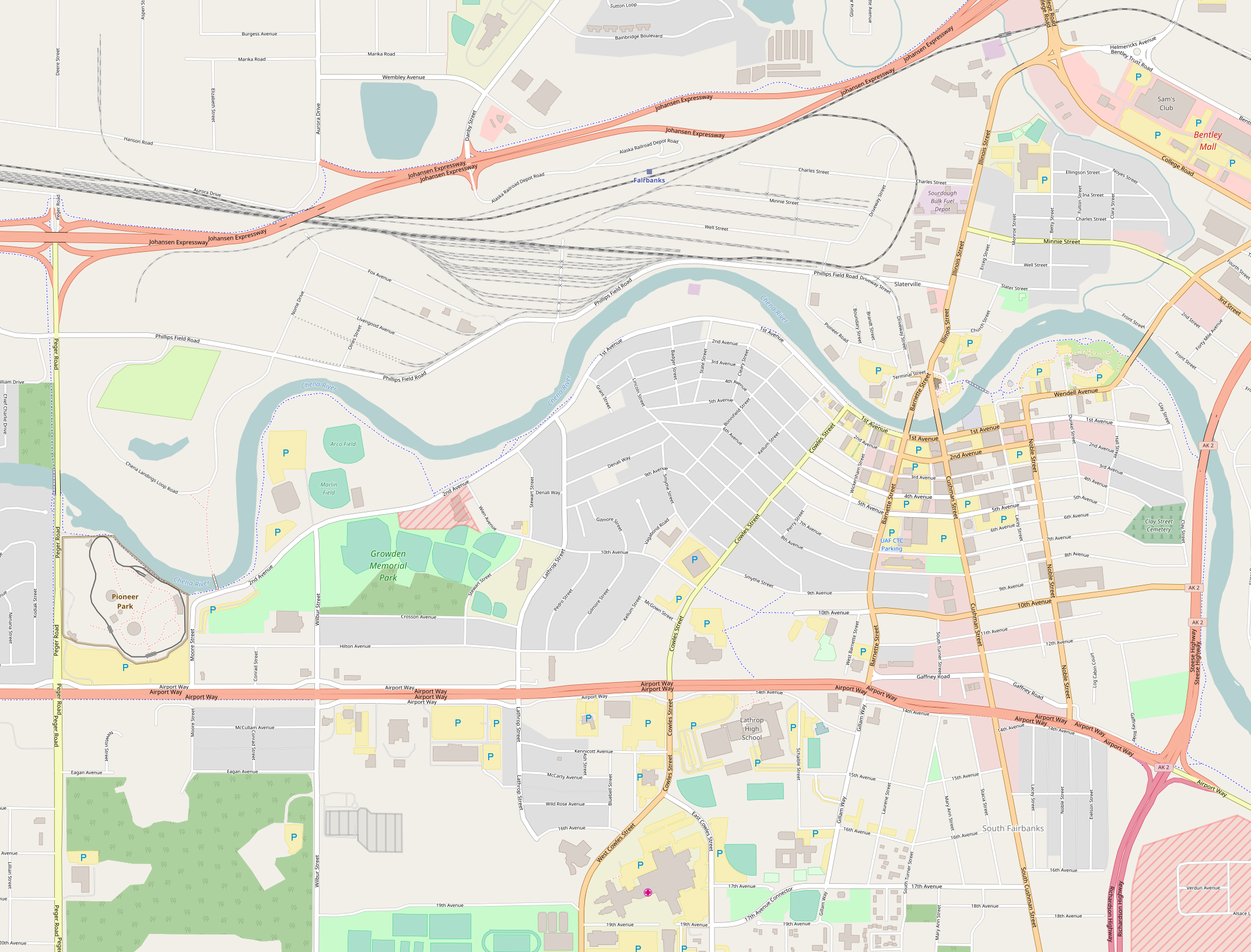
- Location within Downtown Fairbanks Location within Alaska
- Location: 413 Cowles Street, Fairbanks, Alaska
- Coordinates: 64°50′35″N 147°43′49″W
- Area: less than one acre
- Built: 1904
- NRHP reference No.: 80004567
- AHRS No.: FAI-037

Significant dates
- Added to NRHP: April 29, 1980
- Designated AHRS: November, 1978

The Falcon Joslin House is a historic house at 413 Cowles Street in Fairbanks, Alaska. Built in 1904, this American Foursquare two-story frame house is the oldest house in Fairbanks set at its original location, and was one of the first frame houses built in what was then a mining camp. The house was built by Falcon Joslin, a Tennessee lawyer who came to Fairbanks and financed construction of the railroad connection to Chena, the head of navigation on the Tanana River. Joslin's railroad ensured the economic success of Fairbanks, which was then competing with Chena as a supply center for miners in the region. In 1930 the house was purchased by Fairbanks Exploration Company, which used it as housing for executives and employees until 1960.

The house was listed on the National Register of Historic Places in 1980.

== See also ==
- National Register of Historic Places listings in Fairbanks North Star Borough, Alaska
