= Fairbanks Gold Rush =

Gold rush near Fairbanks, Alaska in the early 1900s

Coordinates: 65°0′25″N 147°29′4″W

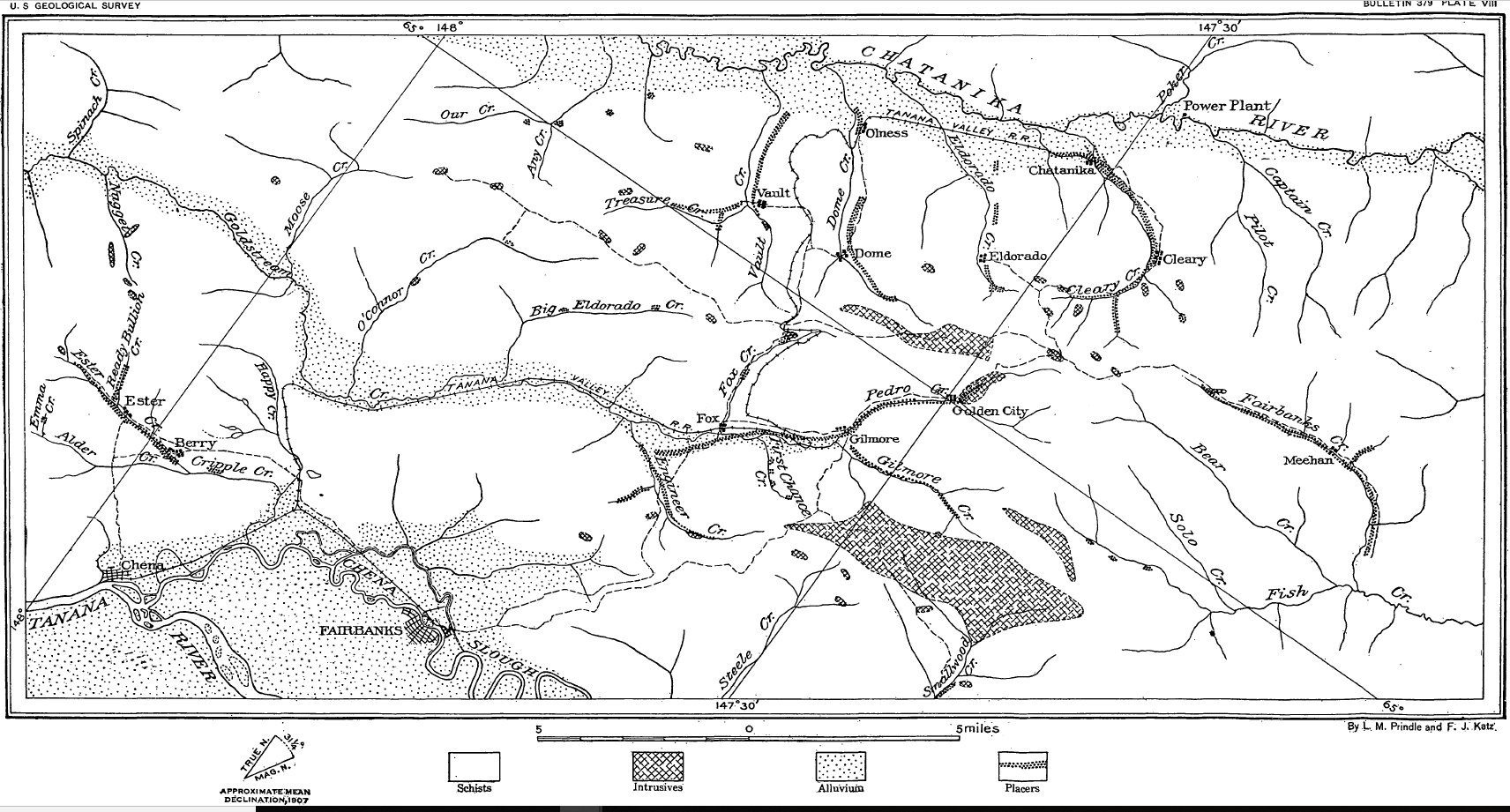
Geological map of the Fairbanks District indicating placer mining along Pedro Creek

The Fairbanks Gold Rush was a gold rush that took place in Fairbanks, Alaska, in the early 1900s. Fairbanks was a city largely built on gold rush fervor at the turn of the 20th century. Discovery and exploration continue to thrive in and around modern-day Fairbanks.

== History ==
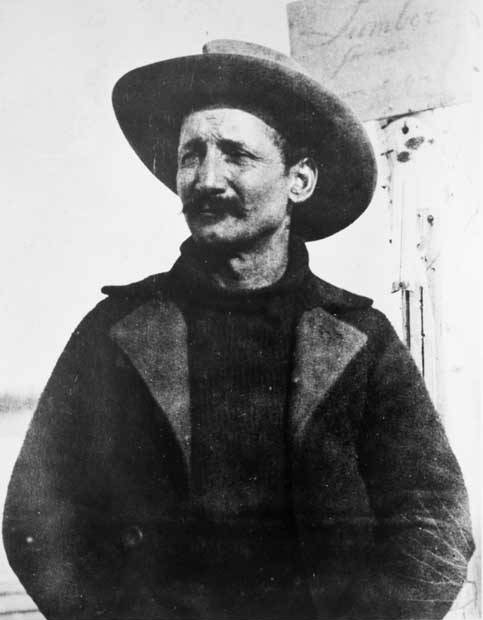
Felix Pedro

Felix Pedro spent years searching for gold. He tried to find gold in the creeks and valleys of the Tanana Valley where Fairbanks would begin before he found the "American Klondike". A trader named E.T. Barnette and his wife, Isabelle, were aboard the riverboat Lavelle Young in August 1901, trying to establish a trading post at Tanacross on the Tanana River. Low water conditions stopped the journey before Barnette could reach his destination. Co-owner of the Lavelle Young, Captain Charles Adams, turned into the Chena River, a tributary of the Tanana, instead. Shallow water stopped the Lavelle Young, and Adams refused to go further, so the Barnettes set up shop there.

Barnette opened a trading post on the Chena River after Pedro had told him he had made some good "prospects". On July 22, 1902, Pedro discovered gold north of Fairbanks in Interior Alaska which triggered the beginning of the Fairbanks Gold Rush, which set off a stampede that transformed the town. Barnette dispatched Jujiro Wada, a Japanese immigrant from Ehime on Shikoku Island, to Dawson City to spread the word that gold had been found in order for Barnette to create a market for his goods. After Wada spread the word about the gold being discovered, many miners who had not already left for the Nome Gold Rush traveled to Fairbanks. The prospectors soon found jobs prospecting for Barnette himself, panning and sluicing for gold in Fairbanks.

The Fairbanks Exploration Company bought up claims within a 30 by 50 mile area and brought in gold dredges on the Alaska Railroad. The population of Fairbanks increased from 1,155 in 1920 to 2,101 in 1930. As Ira Harkey pointed out, "When the dredges finished their work, Fairbanks again shriveled. The dredges remain in the spots where they chewed their last bites, perfectly preserved in the dry arctic air, wooly mammoths for later ages."

On July 22, 1910, approximately eight years after he had discovered gold north of Fairbanks, Felix Pedro died at St. Joseph's Hospital in Fairbanks of an apparent heart attack.

== See also ==
- Fairbanks mining district
- Fairbanks Exploration Company Gold Dredge No. 5
- Fairbanks Exploration Company Dredge No. 2
- Fairbanks Exploration Company Manager's House
- Fairbanks Exploration Company Machine Shop
- Fairbanks Exploration Company Housing
