= Conservatorio Statale di Musica Giuseppe Nicolini =

Coordinates: 45°02′57″N 9°41′29″E

School Logo

The Conservatorio Nicolini is a music school, located on via Santa Franca #35 in the town of Piacenza, region of Emilia Romagna, Italy.

== History ==
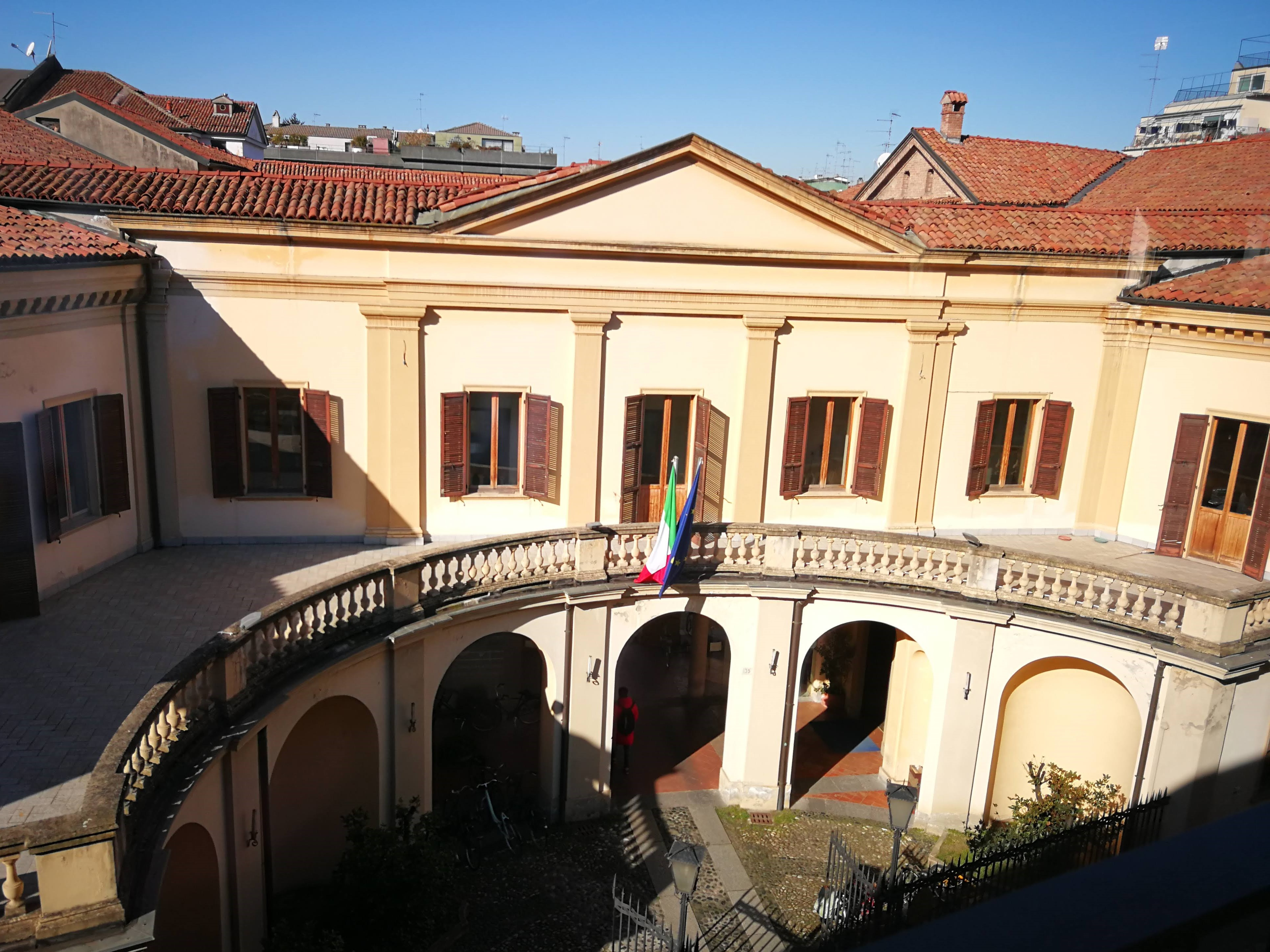
Entrance facade to Nicolini conservatory

The site of the conservatory had been since the 16th century, home to Santa Franca, a cistercian convent of nuns. A church stood where now the adjacent Teatro Filodrammatici stands. The convent and church were suppressed by the Napoleonic government, and the convent for the next few decades had various secular uses, including as barracks. In 1839 the Scuola di Musica di Piacenza was founded. Initially it was housed at the convent of Santa'Agostino; in 1865, it was moved to this site. In 1900 it separated itself from the Municipal Theater authority and in 1933, it became a Liceo Musicale named after the Piacenzan composer Giuseppe Nicolini. In 1977, the school was recognized as an Istituto superiore di studi musicali and became part of the national Organization of Alta Formazione Artistica e Musicale (AFAM).

Among its teachers and docents in the past few decades have been the tenor Gianni Poggi, the opera director Alberto Zedda, and the violinist Fabio Biondi.
