= Illinois Street Historic District =

Historic district in Alaska, United States

- U.S. National Register of Historic Places
- U.S. Historic district
- Alaska Heritage Resources Survey
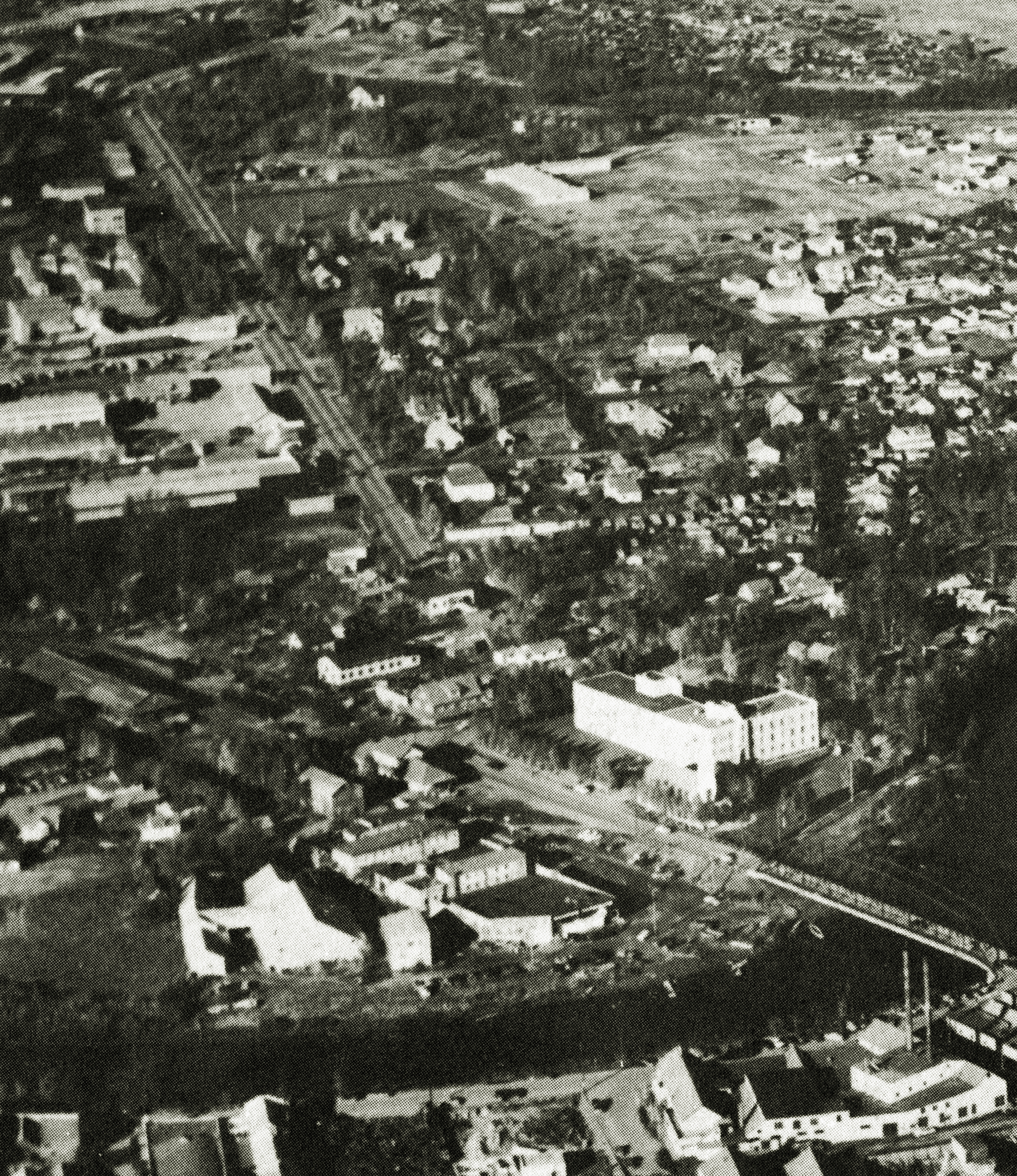
- Aerial view of Illinois and North Cushman streets and the Cushman Street Bridge in 1953. At the time, this was the southern terminus of the Steese Highway, which was soon rerouted following the completion of the Wendell Street Bridge.

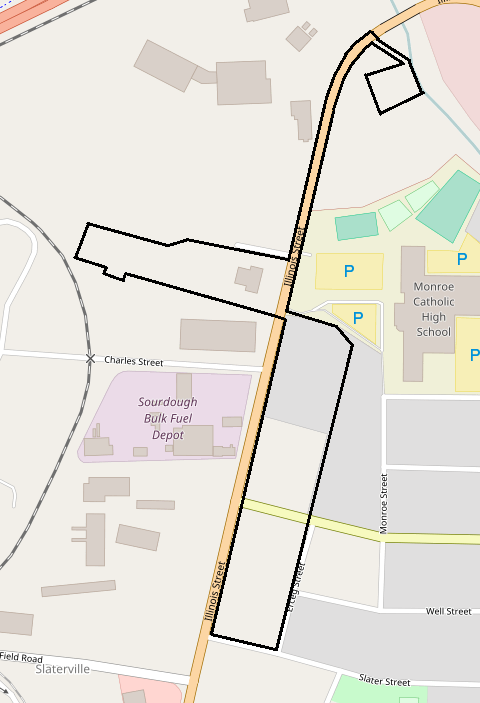
- Boundaries of Illinois Street Historic District
- Location: 300-700 Illinois Street, Fairbanks, Alaska
- Coordinates: 64°50′59″N 147°43′12″W
- Area: 27 acres (11 ha)
- Built: 1925
- Built by: Fairbanks Exploration Company
- Architectural style: Colonial Revival, Tudor Revival, et al.
- NRHP reference No.: 01000966
- AHRS No.: FAI-00349
- Added to NRHP: September 14, 2001

The Illinois Street Historic District encompasses the principal business and residential area of the Fairbanks Exploration Company in Fairbanks, Alaska. It extends along Illinois Street from Slater Street to Noyes Slough, including a series of residential properties on the east side of the road, and the surviving buildings of the F.E. Company complex on the west side. The F.E. Company was a dominating economic force in interior Alaska during the second quarter of the 20th century, and its operations were managed and organized from this area. Included in the district are eight houses, including the Colonial Revival Manager's House and a group of four bungalows built by the company for its employees. The company also acquired and refurbished the 1911 home of Fred Noyes, for whom Noyes Slough is named. Of the company's once-extensive industrial complex on the west side of Illinois Street, only the administration building (612 Illinois Street) and the machine shop (behind the administration building and across the railroad tracks) survive. A portion of Illinois Street, which follows the original alignment of a dirt track through the area, is also included in the district.

The district was listed on the National Register of Historic Places in 2001.

== Contributing Properties ==
The historical district contains a total of 14 contributing properties, built between 1911 and 1935:

- Johnson-Hayr House at 303 Illinois Street, 64°50′55″N 147°43′12″W, built c. 1930.
- Mapleton-Seton House at 315 Illinois Street, 64°50′55″N 147°43′11″W, built c. 1930.
- Noyes House, now known as the Chapel of Chimes Funeral Home, at 407 Illinois Street, 64°50′59″N 147°43′09″W, built c. 1911.
- The seven buildings comprised in F.E. Company Housing historical district, at 505, 507, 521 and 523 Illinois Street, 64°51′02″N 147°43′06″W, built 1927–1928.
- The F.E. Company Manager's House, at 757 Illinois Street, 64°51′11″N 147°42′58″W, built 1935.
- The F.E. Company Administrative Office, at 700 block Illinois Street, 64°51′06″N 147°43′11″W, built c. 1927.
- The F.E. Company Machine Shop, at 612 Illinois Street, 64°51′07″N 147°43′20″W, built 1927.
- Illinois Street itself, for the tract comprised between Slater Street and Noyes Slough.

== See also ==
- National Register of Historic Places listings in Fairbanks North Star Borough, Alaska
