= San Giuseppe Sposo di Maria, Fanano =

Church in Fanano, Modena

Coordinates: 44°12′27″N 10°47′36″E

San Giuseppe Sposo di Maria is baroque-style, Roman Catholic parish church located in the town of Fanano in the province of Modena, region of Emilia-Romagna, Italy.

== History ==
The church was built in 1619, along with the Collegio delle Scuole Pie, by Ottonello Ottonelli. The interiors are richly decorated with polychrome marble. Among the canvases in the interior are a Martyrdom of St Catherine of Alexandria by Guercino, and a Madonna della Ghiara attributed to Ludovico Lana. Other paintings are attributed to Pellegrino da Fanano and Girolamo Vanulli. The nave ceiling was painted by Fermo Forti. From the church there was a corridor accessing the city hall.
