= Ascanio Magnanini =

Italian painter

Ascanio Magnanini (active 1599–1621) was an Italian painter, active mainly in Modena. He was born in Fanano. He painted an altarpiece for San Silvestro Papa and San Francesco, Fanano.
