= Oratorio della Beata Vergine delle Grazie, Fanano =

Oratory in Modena province, Italy

Coordinates: 44°12′13.1″N 10°47′09.1″E

The Oratorio della Beata Vergine delle Grazie (Oratory of the Blessed Virgin of the Graces), also known as the Oratorio della Madonna del Ponte, is a Roman Catholic chapel-like building, or small church, located in the town of Fanano in the province of Modena, region of Emilia-Romagna, Italy. It is located near a bridge over the river Fellicarolo.

== History ==
The oratory was erected in 1650 around an icon placed on an aedicule near the bridge. It was refurbished in the last century, and dedicated to those emigrating from the town. The plaque in front of the church recalls Felice Pedroni, one of the most prominent emigrants from Fanano. The main altar was constructed by the brothers Gherardini and houses a canvas depicting God the Father and Saints by Pellegrino da Fanano.
