= Scaffaiolo Lake =

Lake in Italy

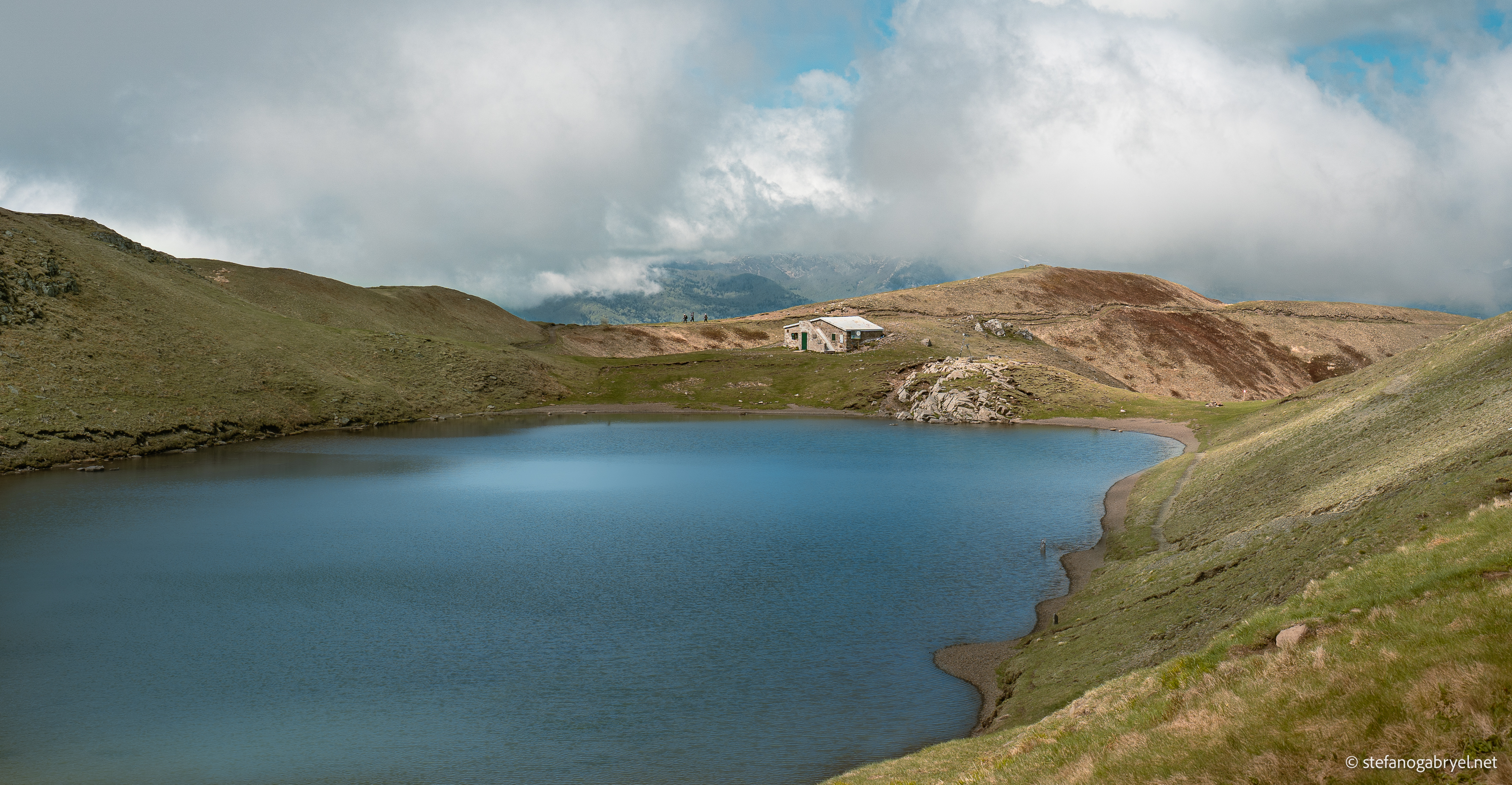

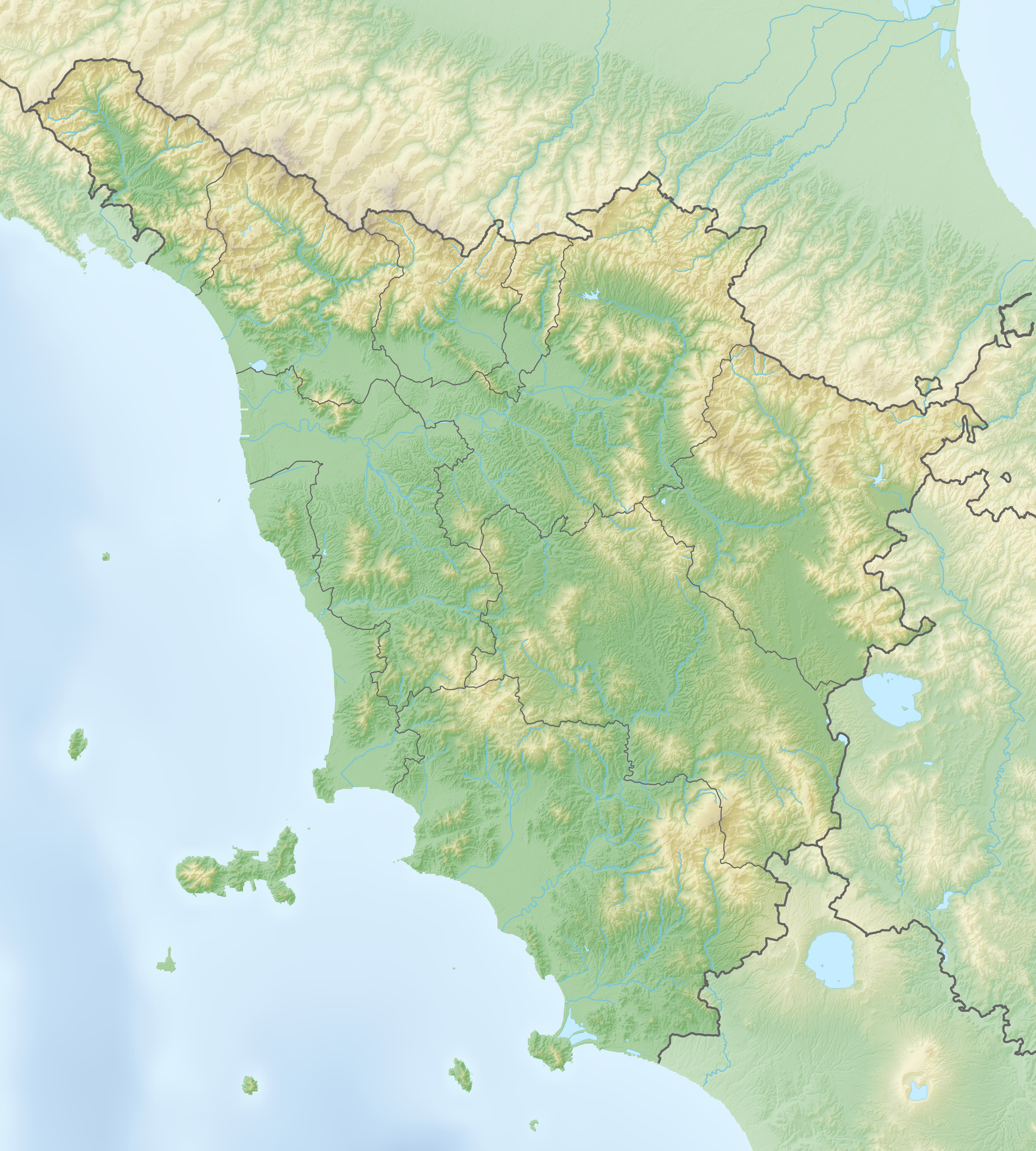
- Location within Tuscany
- Location: Province of Pistoia, Tuscany / Province of Modena, Emilia-Romagna
- Coordinates: 44°07′N 10°22′E
- Basin countries: Italy
- Surface area: 0.05 km^{2} (0.019 sq mi)
- Surface elevation: 1,775 m (5,823 ft)

Lake Scaffaiolo is a mountain lake located in the municipality of Fanano, in the Province of Modena (Emilia-Romagna), Italy, within the high Modenese Apennines. Its name is believed to derive from the term scaffa, a likely Lombard word meaning “a hollow in the ground” or “a depression.” The lake lies at an elevation of 1,775 meters and has a surface area of 0.05 km².
