= Cristoforo Agosta =

Italian painter

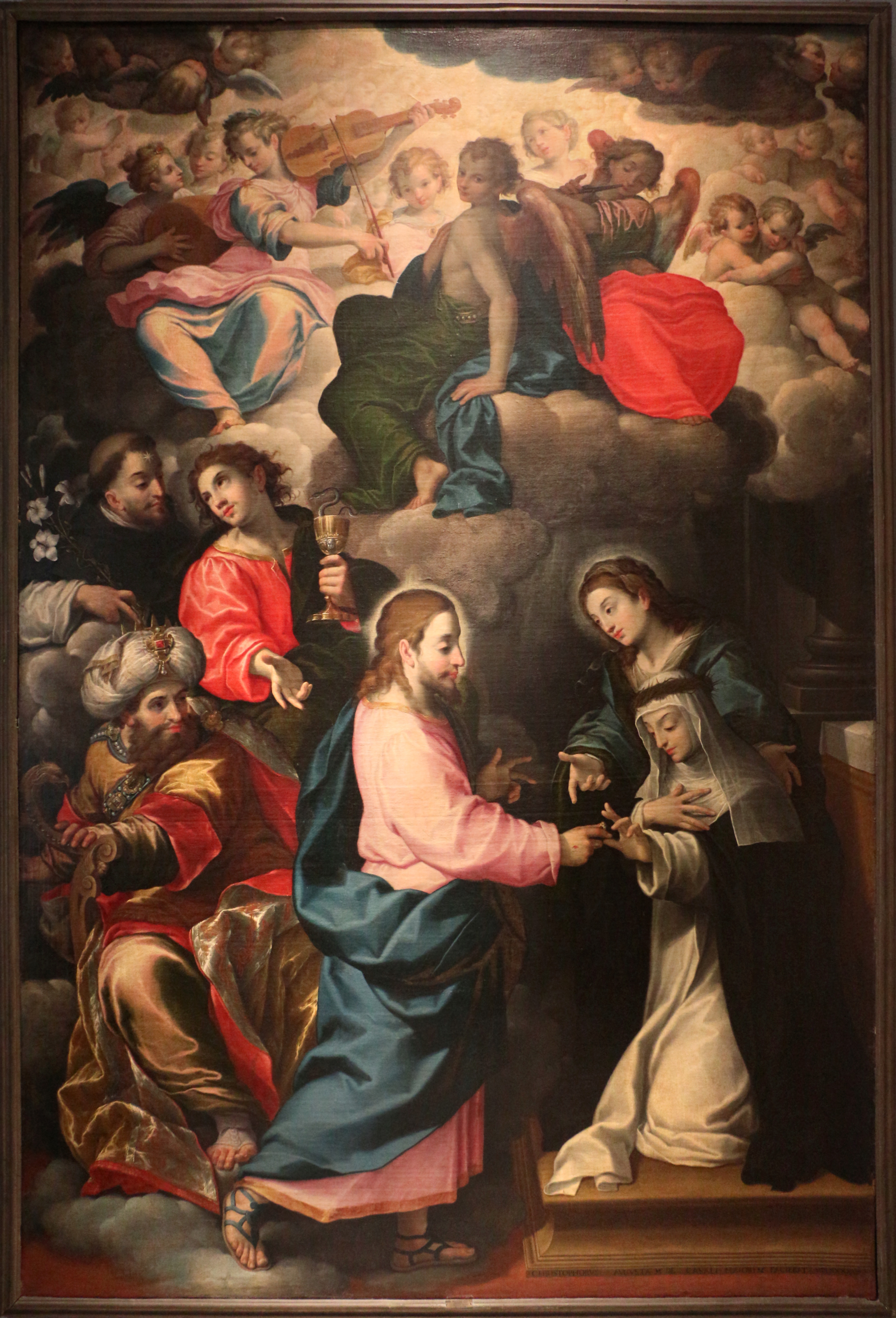
Mystical Marriage of Saint Catherine of Siena by Cristoforo Agosta, 1597

Cristoforo Agosta, Agosti, or Augusta (16-17th century) was an Italian painter of the Mannerist style.

== Biography ==
Agosta was born in Casalmaggiore. He was a pupil of Giovanni Battista Trotti and active in Cremona. The 18th-century art historian Giovanni Battista Zaist assigned to him the Marriage of Santa Caterina, once in the church of San Domenico in Cremona (now in the Pinacoteca of Cremona).
