= San Colombano, Fanano =

Coordinates: 44.2072°N 10.7910°E

San Colombano is Romanesque-style, Roman Catholic former-parish church located in the town of Fanano in the region of Emilia-Romagna, Italy.

== History ==
The small ancient church, first documented in the 7th century, is now located adjacent to the present parish church in Fanano. It was founded by monks from the Columban Bobbio Abbey.

Other sources claim St Anselm established the church on land donated by the Lombard King Astolfo. Anselm then soon left to found the Abbey of Nonantola. The church had a nearby monastery and hospice for pilgrims and the destitute.

Rebuilt in 1580, it again was razed after 15 years due to the dilapidation, and re-built by Ottonello Ottonelli. Only the base and substructure date to the earlier churches. In 1897, it underwent a further restoration to try to return to original design and layout.
