= Francesco Superti =

Italian painter

Francesco Superti (active circa 1600) was an Italian painter.

== Biography ==
He was born in Cremona and trained under Antonio Campi and Giovanni Battista Trotti. He painted in the churches of Sant'Antonio Abate and the Theatines in Cremona. A painting in San Nicola di Bari, Sestola is attributed to Superti.
