= San Silvestro, Fanano =

Roman Catholic Church in Fanano, Italy

Coordinates: 44.2075°N 10.7907°E

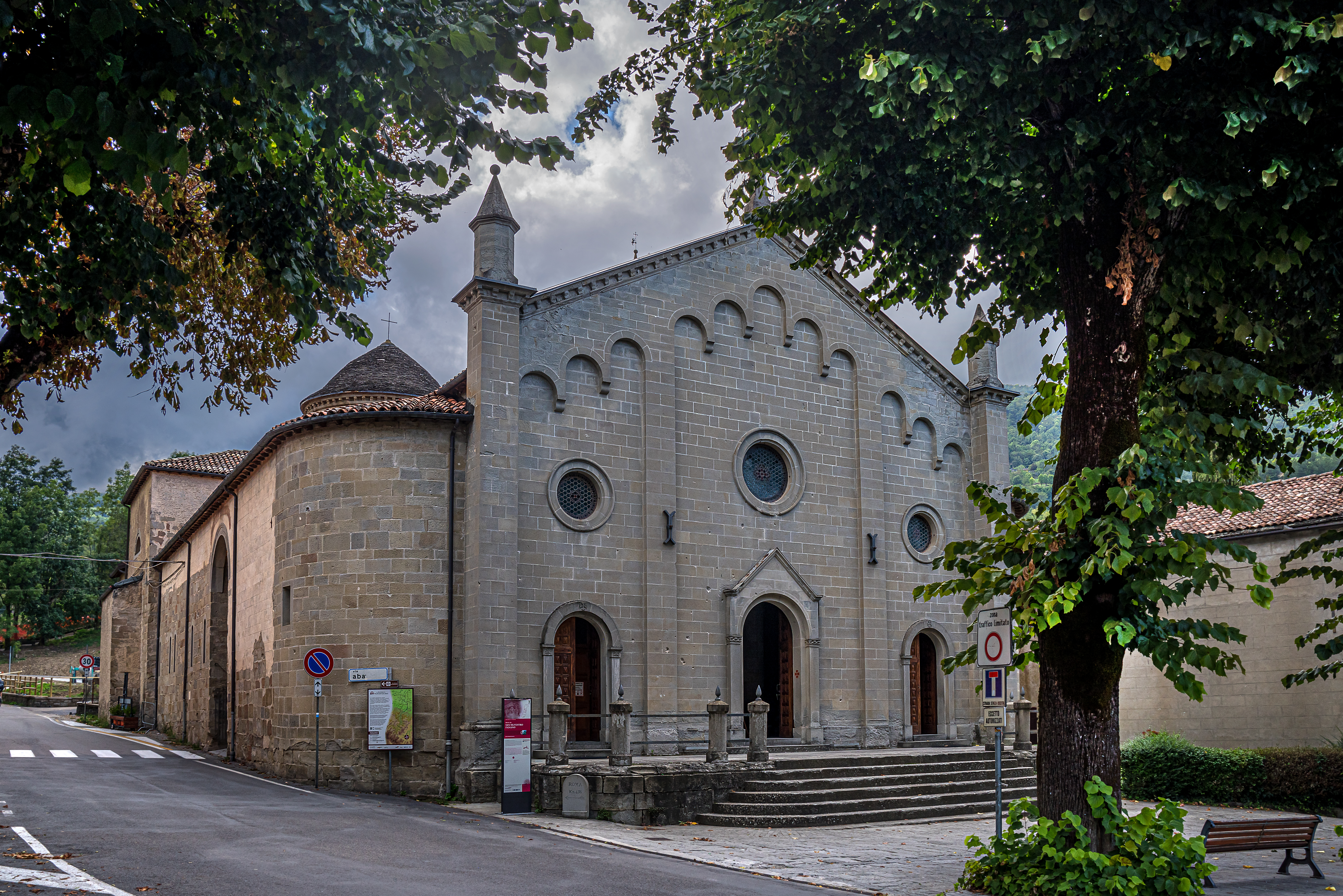
church of San Silvestro papa

San Silvestro is Baroque-style, Roman Catholic parish church located at Via Abà #9 in the town of Fanano in the region of Emilia-Romagna, Italy. The church still has traces of Romanesque architecture in sculpted column capitals (1206) from the crypt and the apse.

== History ==
A church at the site was supposedly founded by 750 by Sant'Anselmo, who abandoned a post as Duke of Friuli to become a cenobitic monk. The land was ceded by his cousin Astolfo, King of the Lombards. Anselmo later moved to found the abbey of Nonantola.

Documentation for the church is only found from the 14th-century. However a fire destroyed that church, and an expanded and re-oriented Baroque-style church was erected in 1612. The new church had a nave with flanking aisles, and was supplemented with various chapels. Construction utilized spolia from the prior edifice. A 20th-century refurbishment attempted to reimpose a Romanesque style to the building.

The church houses a Madonna and Saints by Domenico Passignano, as well as a painting by Pellegrino Pellegrini (Fanano painter). I also has a 14th-century fresco attributed to either Tommaso or Barnaba da Modena, and canvases by Ascanio Magnanini, Francesco Curradi, and Matteo Ponzone.
