= Albano Lugli =

Italian painter (1834–1914)

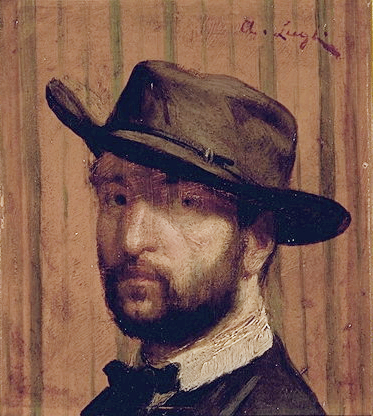
Self-portrait (1857/60)

Albano Lugli (13 November 1834 – 8 August 1914) was an Italian painter and ceramic artist; mainly active in his hometown. He specialized in historic scenes, sacred subjects, and portraits.

== Biography ==
He was born in Carpi. He was the eldest of nine children born to Venanzio Lugli and Quiteria née Govi, a family of modest means, and began his training at the municipal drawing school in Carpi. In 1849, at the age of fifteen, he enrolled at the Academy of Fine Arts in Modena, under the direction of Adeodato Malatesta. His primary instructor was Luigi Asioli, and he excelled at figurative painting. In 1860, he performed his first public commission; painting the oval music hall at the Municipal Theater of Carpi, in a style reminiscent of the Renaissance master Correggio.

He was awarded a scholarship in 1867, and moved to Florence. There, he studied with Enrico Pollastrini, professor at the Academy of Fine Arts, who stressed copying the Old Masters to develop skill. This led to his adopting a style known as "pittura di macchia" (stain painting), practiced by a group called the Macchiaioli, involving broad and thick brushstrokes.

In 1870, he returned to Carpi and married Clarice Remini, daughter of the engraver Abramo Rimini. Shortly after, he received another commission; creating the Proclamation of the Dogma of the Immaculate Conception in the left apse of the transept at the Church of San Nicolò.

From 1874 to 1882, he lived in Reggio Emilia. There, together with Fermo Forti and Lelio Rossi (1844–1907), he executed paintings, mostly of saints, in the Cathedral of the Assumption. This project would occupy him periodically until 1890. During this time, he continued to work in Carpi and other cities in the region; at the parish church of San Nicola di Bari, Sestola, as well as the churches of San Bernardino in Carpi and San Francisco in Mirandola. Both of the latter were severely damaged by an earthquake in 2012. He also painted historical scenes from the lives of artists, past and present, such as Giotto and Ghiberti, numerous portraits of local notables, and some Genre scenes.

He was a member of several art societies, and served as a Professor at the Academy in Modena. He died in his hometown, aged seventy-nine.

== Selected works ==
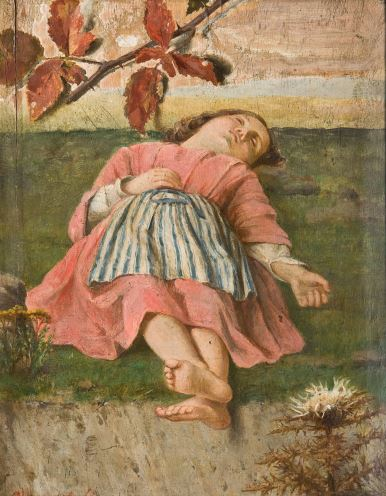
A Sleeping Little Girl

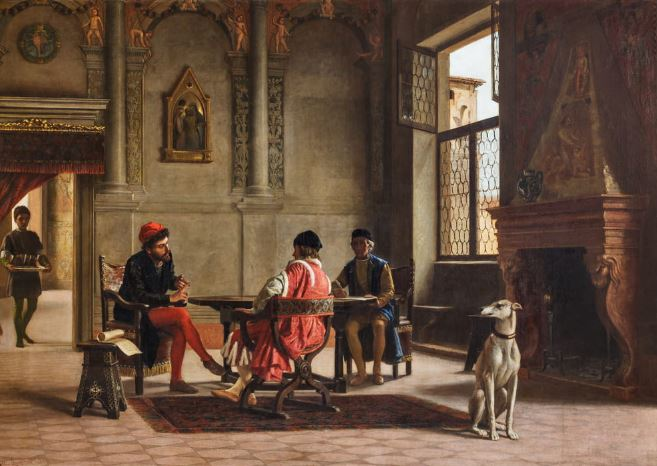
Ludovico Ariosto meeting
Alberto III Pio

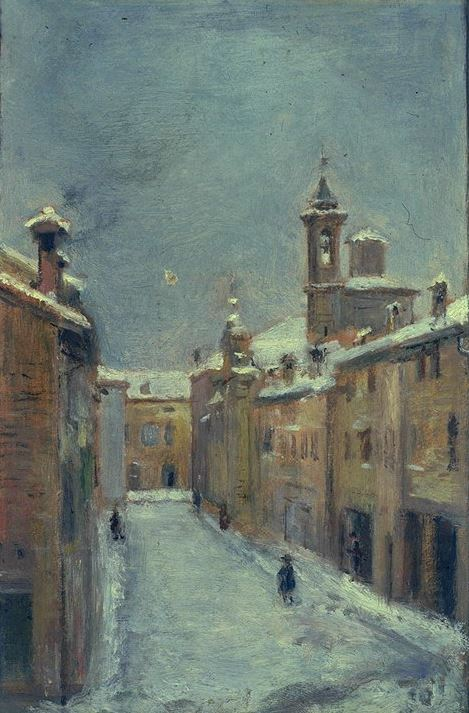
The District of San Bernardino, Carpi

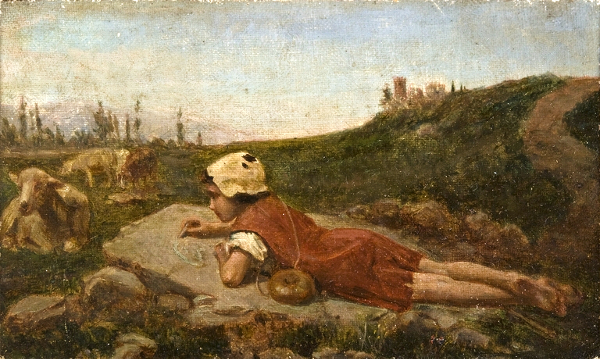
Giotto as a Boy, Drawing Sheep

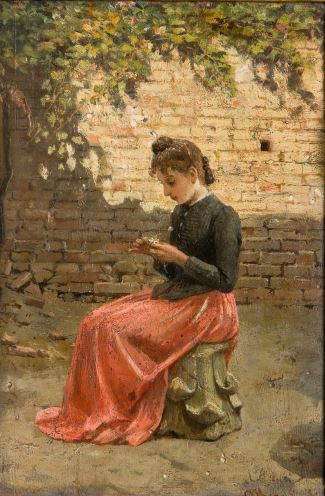
He Loves Me,
He Loves Me Not
