= Stefano Lambri =

Italian painter

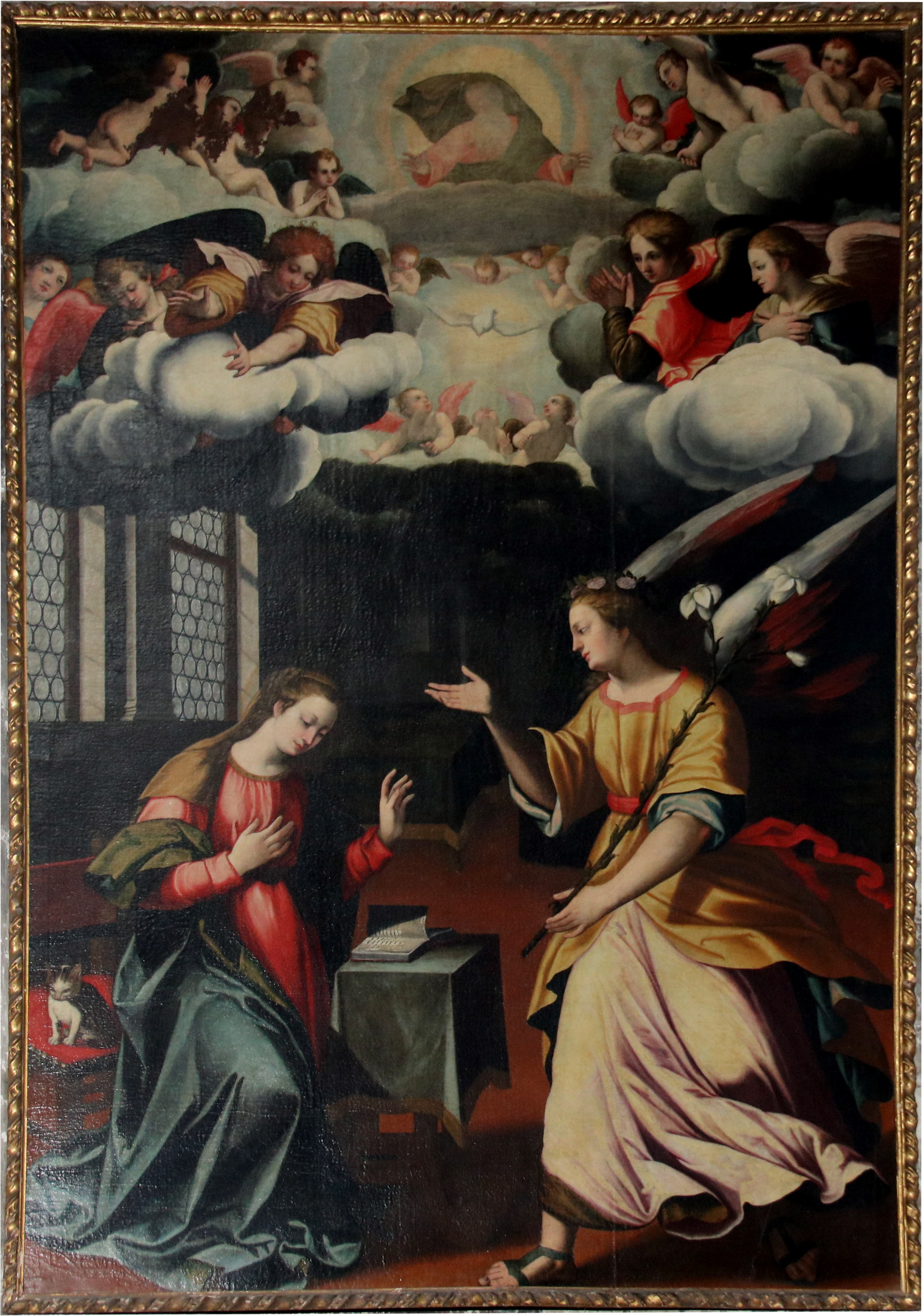
Annunciation

Stefano Lambri (active 1620s) was an Italian painter of histories and portraits. He trained with the painter Giovanni Battista Trotti. He painted in 1628, for the Dominican Church of Cremona, a picture representing St. William and St. Louis Bertrand.
