= Santa Chiara, Fanano =

Church in Fanano, Italy

Santa Chiara is a renaissance-style Roman Catholic church and adjacent Clarissan convent located in the town of Fanano in the province of Modena, region of Emilia-Romagna, Italy.

== History ==
The present church is a reconstruction, after the earthquake of 1920, of the classical 16th-century church designed by count Ottonello Ottonelli. The stone façade has a central oculus, and two flanking windows. The interior has two polychrome wood altarpiece frames: one houses an Assumption (1600) painted by Francesco Cavazzoni, while the other has a Madonna and Saints by Mastelletta.
