= San Nicola di Bari, Sestola =

Church building in Sestola, Italy

San Nicola di Bari is Roman Catholic parish church located in the town of Sestola in the region of Emilia-Romagna, Italy.

== History ==
The earlier Romanesque-style church was rebuilt and re-oriented. The church was reconsecrated in 1629, by the vicar general of the Abbey of Nonantola. It had been decorated under the patronage of Ludovico and Bartolomeo Cavalcabò, local aristocrats of the 16th-17th centuries. The interior has a central nave with two aisles. Between 1897 and 1902 it was refurbished and frescoed by Albano Lugli, including frescoes of a St Nicolò da Bari in the apse. The facade was completed in 1909.

The first chapel on the right has a canvas depicting the 'Madonna and Child with Saints, a copy of a work by Camillo Boccaccino. The second has a 16th-century canvas depicting the Glory of St Joseph. The third chapel has a 17th-century canvas depicting the Madonna of the Carmine with Saints Blaise and Francis attributed to Orazio Brunetti. It is flanked by paintings of St Roch and St Sebastian. The main altarpiece at the last chapel is a Pietà, a copy of a work by Bernardino Gatti. In the presbytery, is a canvas depicting the Supper at Emmaus by a 16th-century Lombard painter and 17th-century wooden statues depicting Saints Dominic and Nicolò. On the main altar is a 15th-century wood crucifix. The fourth chapel on the left by the apse has an Adoration of the Shepherds, a copy of a work of Bernardino Campi; in the third chapel on left is a Madonna del Roseto, a copy of a work by Francesco Francia by Giovanni Battista Bertusio. In the third chapel on left is a Crucifixion with St Antony Abbot and Francis of Assisi attributed to Francesco Superti; in the first chapel on left, are two canvases The Ascent of Christ and an Annunciation, copies of works by Bernardino Campi. In the nave is a Guardian Angel by Francesco Curradi.
