= Giulio Calvi =

Italian painter

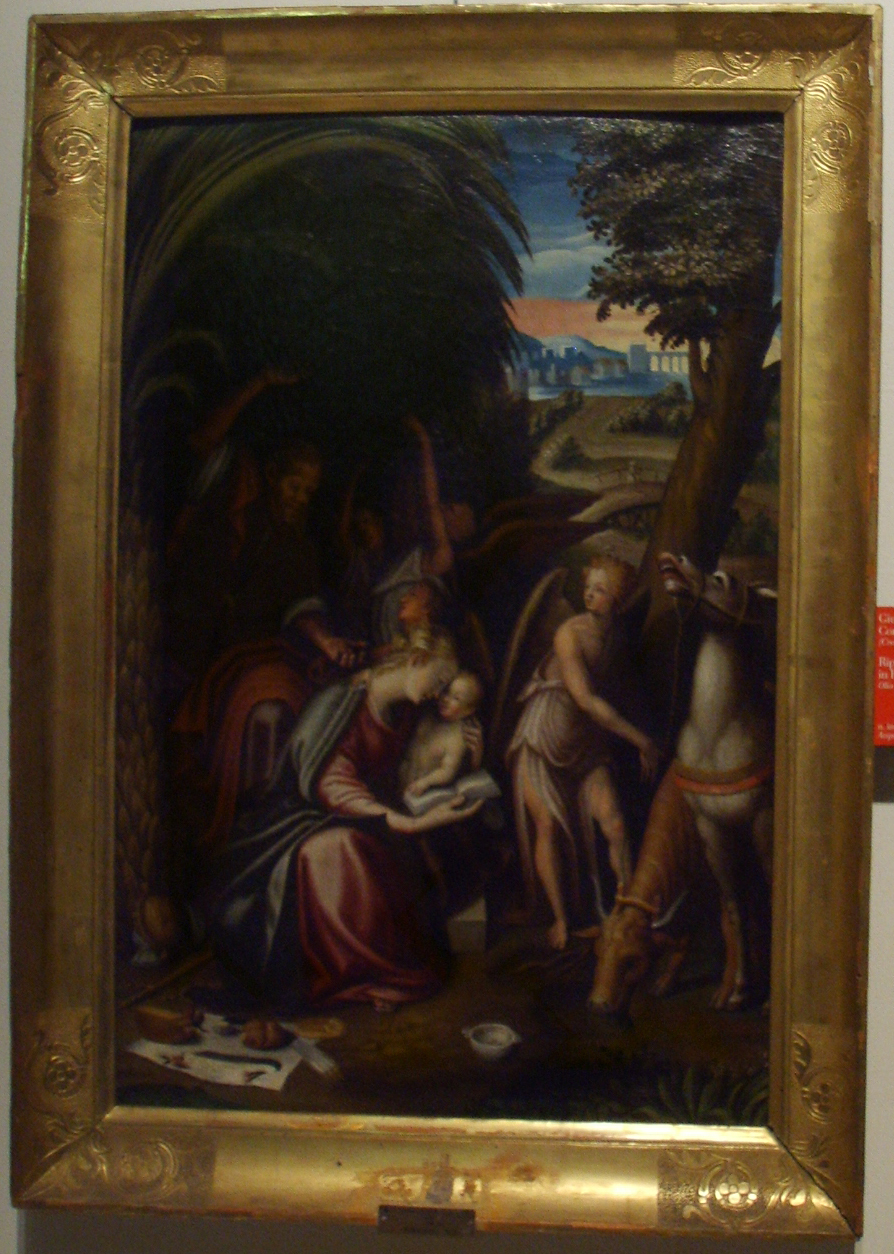
The Rest on The Flight into Egypt

Giulio Calvi (called Il Cobonato) (c. 1570–1596) was an Italian painter of the Renaissance. He was born in Cremona, and active there and at Soncino. He was a pupil of Giovanni Battista Trotti.
