= Orazio Brunetti =

Italian engraver and painter

Orazio Brunetti (born 1630) was an Italian engraver and painter, active mainly in Rome, Papal States.

== Biography ==
He was born in Siena and trained in Rome, following the style of François de Poilly. Among his engravings is a Sant'Agnese based on a design of Francesco Rustici. He also engraved a St Sebastian, St George slays the Dragon, Four Seasons, The Golden Age, The Prodigal Son, and a mythologic subject. A Madonna of the Carmine with Saints Blaise and Francis in San Nicola di Bari, Sestola is attributed to Brunetti.
