= San Francesco, Fanano =

Church in Fanano, Italy

Coordinates: 44.211799°N 10.795048°E

San Francesco is 17th-century Roman Catholic church, once attached to a Franciscan monastery, located just outside of the town of Fanano in the province of Modena, region of Emilia-Romagna, Italy. The church is now used as the chapel for the town cemetery.

The church was originally dedicated to the Madonna of the Assumption. The portico with ionic columns was erected in 1636. The interiors are decorated by Gherardini, Ascanio Magnanini and contemporary stucco artists.
