= Sant'Adriano III Papa, Spilamberto =

Church in Spilamberto, Modena, Italy

Coordinates: 44°31′58.31″N 11°1′31.21″E

Sant'Adriano III Papa is a Roman Catholic parish church located in Spilamberto, province of Modena, region of Emilia-Romagna, Italy.

== History ==
A church was founded at the site in the 13th century by the Abbot of Nonantola and dedicated to Pope Adrian III, who died in 885 nearby. This first church was destroyed by a fire in 1252, but rebuilt and underwent a number of refurbishments until it was rebuilt in the present Neoclassical-style in 1713, under the architect Giovanni Antonio Franchini. The bell tower was not completed until 1828.

The interior houses a terracotta Madonna della Rondine by Michele da Firenze and an anonymously sculpted Beata Vergine degli Angioli. There are two terracotta Depositions: a 19th-century work by Giuseppe Obici in the sacristy and another by Prudenzio Piccioli. Among the paintings and altarpieces in the church, some originate from the deconsecrated church of Santa Maria degli Angioli. Among the painters are Ippolito Scarsella, Jacopo Zoboli, F. Madonnina, Francesco Stringa, and R. Franciosino. The church has frescoes by Fermo Forti. The 16th century organ was completed by the Cipri family.
