= Giovanni Battista Trotti =

Italian painter

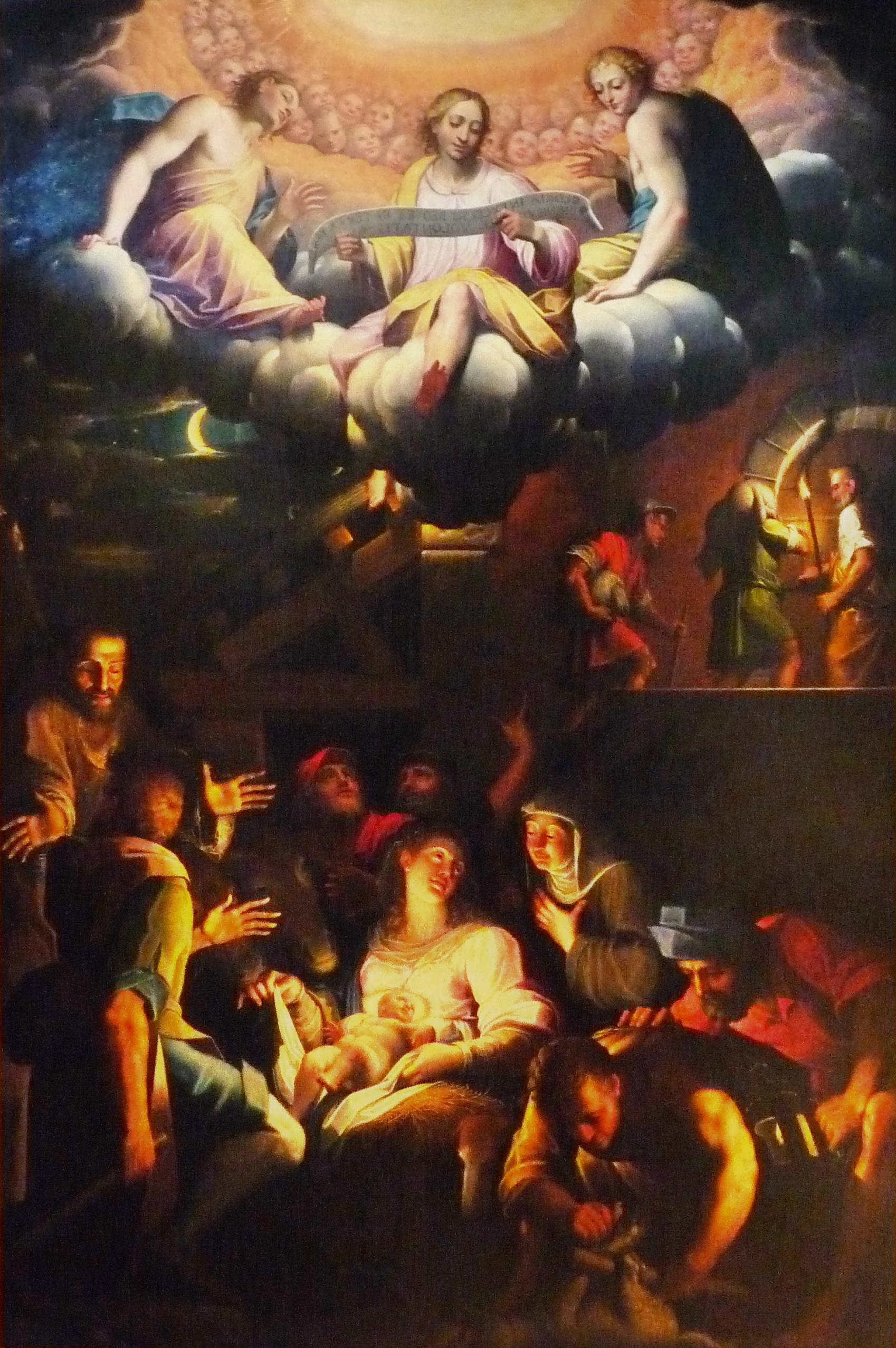
- Adoration by Shepherds
- Born: 1555; Cremona, Lombardy
- Died: 1612 (aged 56–57)
- Education: Bernardino Campi
- Known for: Painter
- Movement: Late Renaissance

Giovanni Battista Trotti (1555 – 11 June 1612) was an Italian painter of the late-Renaissance period, active mainly in Piacenza, Parma, and his native city of Cremona.

In Cremona, he was initially a pupil of Bernardino Campi, whose niece he married. He painted in the Palazzo dei Giardino in Parma. He painted a Crucifixion in the Cremona Cathedral; while in San Pietro, he painted a Santa Maria Egiziaca (St. Mary of Egypt). He painted the Beheading of John the Baptist for San Domenico at Cremona, and in San Francesco and Sant'Agostino at Piacenza. He was employed by the court of Parma, along with Agostino Carracci; and Agostino found Trotti disagreeable on which account he acquired the name of II Malosso (bad bone).

Other pictures by him are: a Immaculate Conception for San Francesco Grande, in Piacenza, and a Descent from the Cross, now found in the Brera Academy. He painted frescoes in the cupola of Sant'Abbondi, after designs by Campi, and in the Palazzo del Giordani, in Parma. For these he was rewarded with the title of Cavalière. One of his last works was a Pietà (1607) for the church of San Giovanni Novo in Cremona. Pupils of Trotti include Stefano Lambri, Francesco Superti, Giulio Calvi, and Cristoforo Augusta.

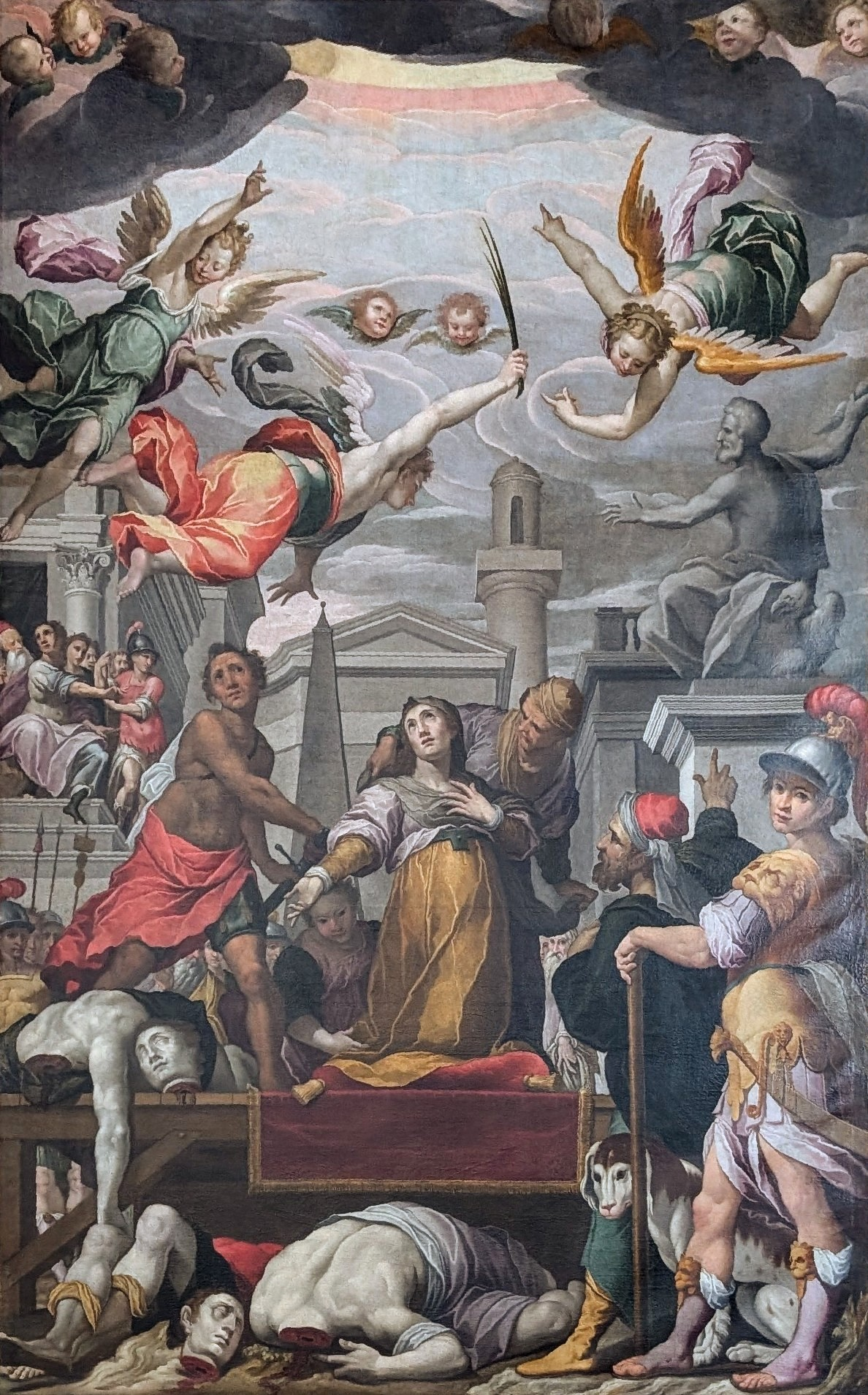
Martyrdom of Saint Felicita and her Children

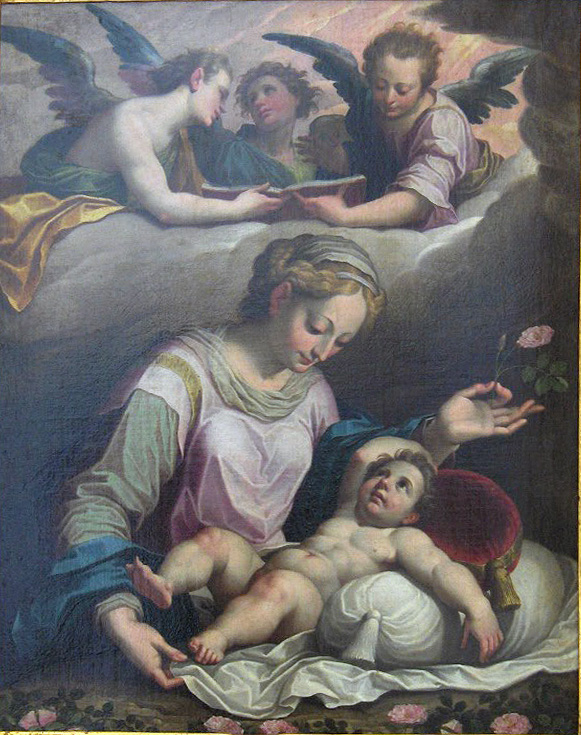
Madonna with the Rose
City Museum, Rimini, Italy

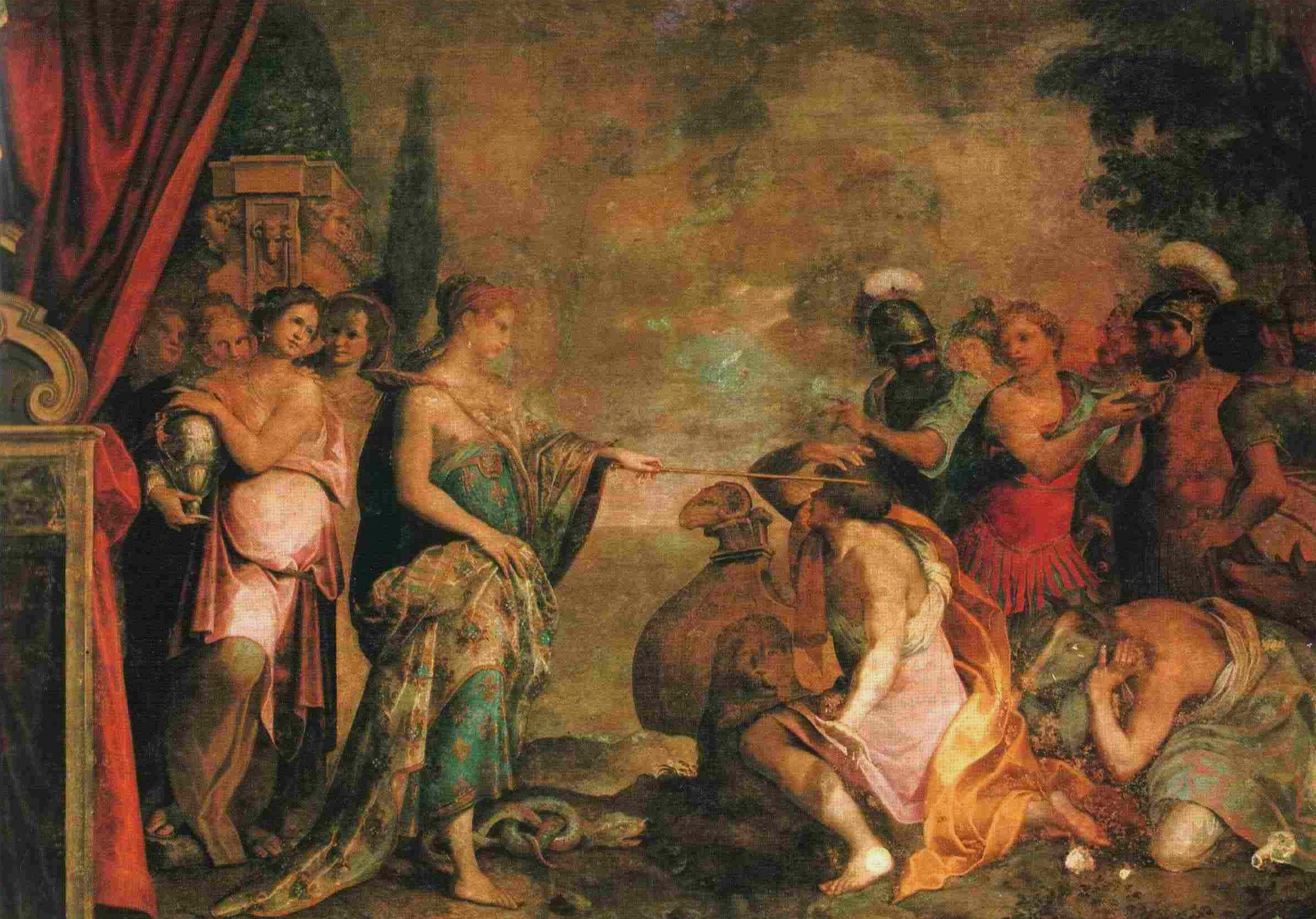
Circe

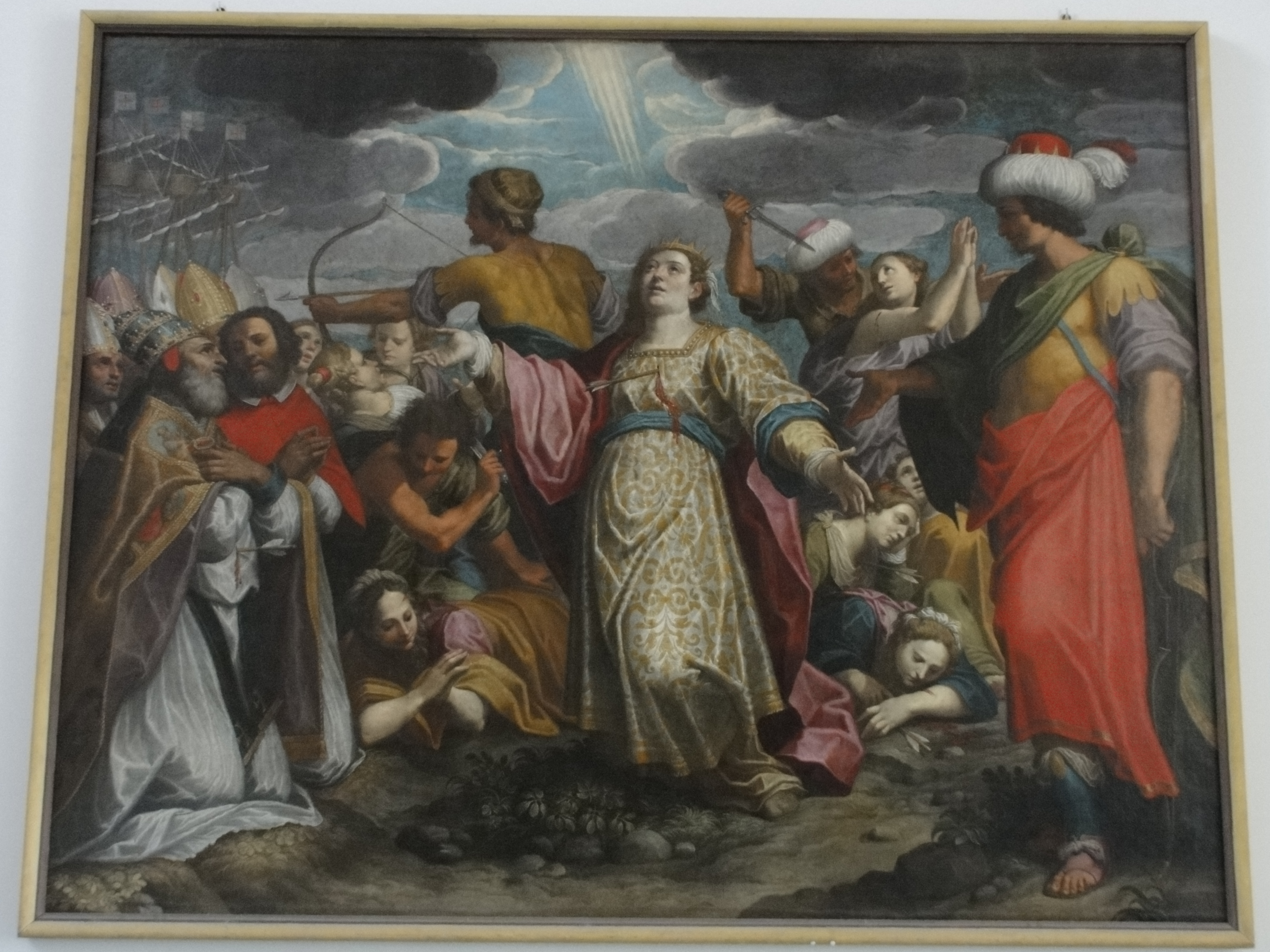
Martyrdom of St Ursula
