= Fairbanks Exploration Company Manager's House =

Historic house in Alaska, United States

- F. E. Company Manager's House
- U.S. National Register of Historic Places
- U.S. Historic district – Contributing property
- Alaska Heritage Resources Survey
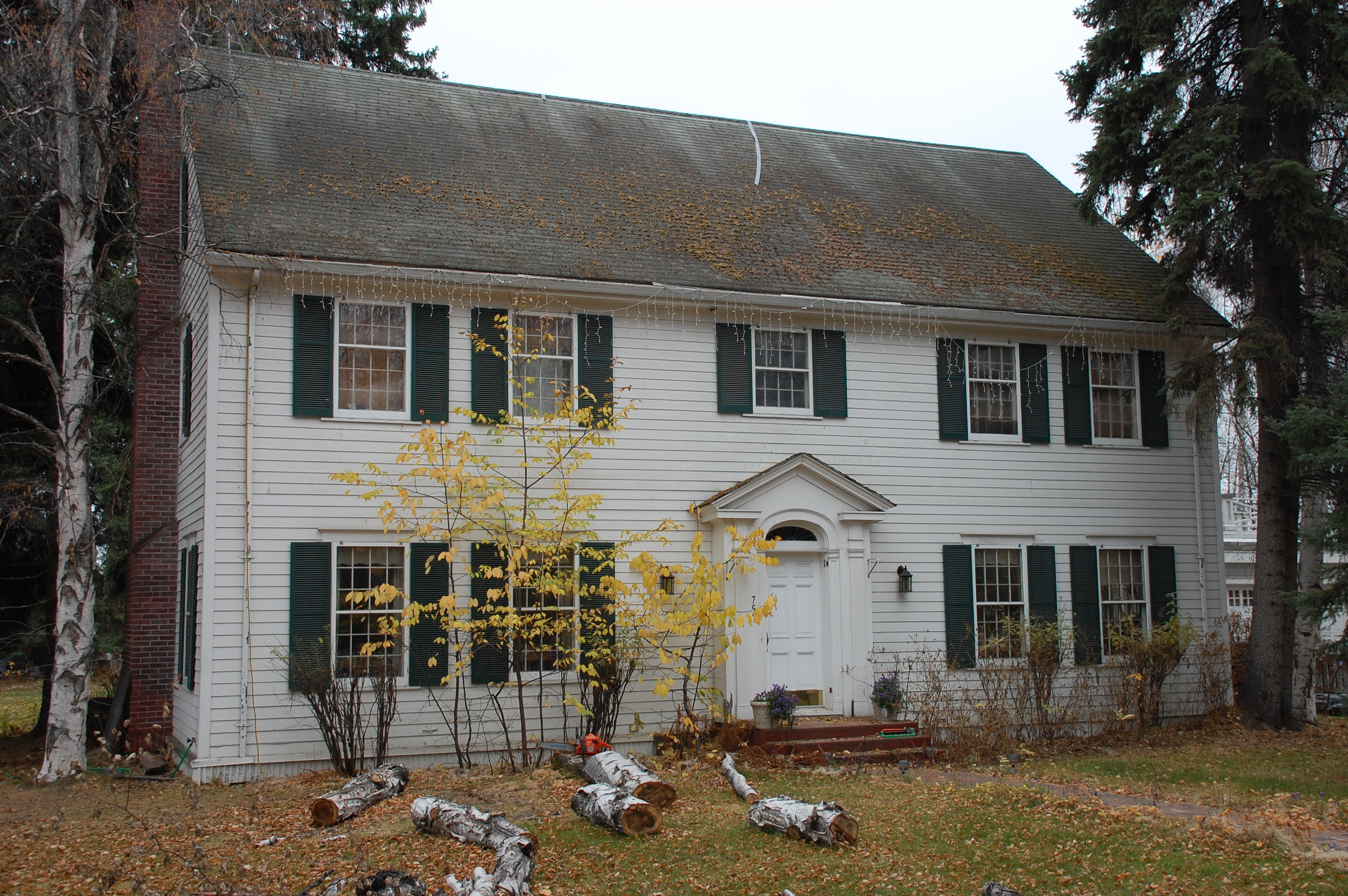

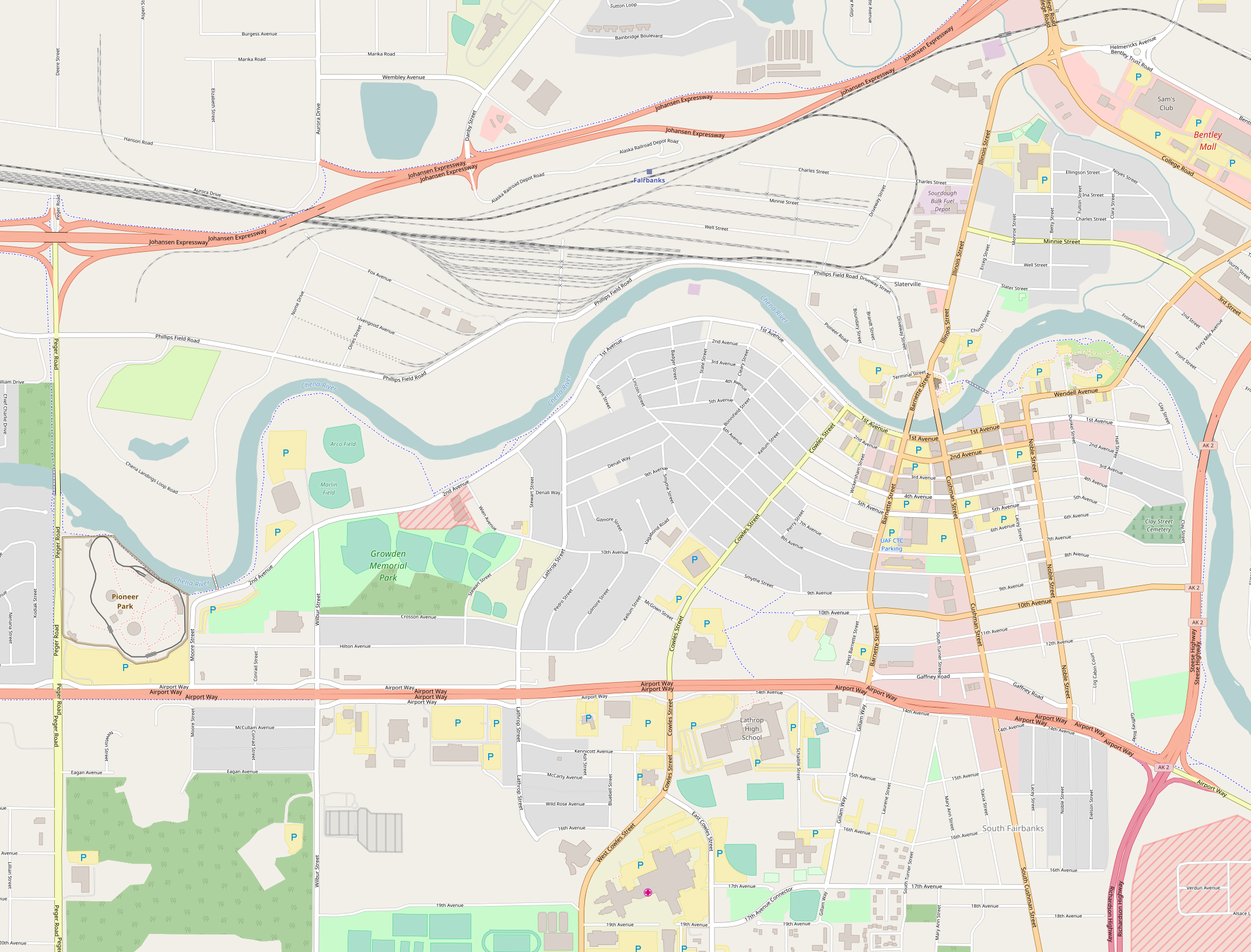
- Location within Downtown Fairbanks Location within Alaska
- Location: 757 Illinois Street, Fairbanks, Alaska
- Coordinates: 64°51′11″N 147°42′58″W
- Area: 1.038 acres (0.420 ha)
- Built: 1936
- Built by: Victor Johnson
- Architectural style: Colonial Revival
- Part of: Illinois Street Historic District (ID01000966)
- NRHP reference No.: 96000095
- AHRS No.: FAI-273

Significant dates
- Added to NRHP: February 16, 1996
- Designated CP: September 14, 2001

The Fairbanks Exploration Company Manager's House, also known as The White House and the Sisters' Convent, is a historic house at 757 Illinois Street in Fairbanks, Alaska. It is a three-story wood-frame structure, five bays wide, with a side gable roof, clapboard siding, and a post-and-beam foundation. An ell extends from the center of the rear. The house was built in 1935-36 by the Fairbanks Exploration Company to house its local vice president and general manager. It is the first Colonial Revival house built in Fairbanks, and is one of the state's finest examples of the style.

The house was listed on the National Register of Historic Places in 1996.

== See also ==
- National Register of Historic Places listings in Fairbanks North Star Borough, Alaska
