= St. Joseph's Hospital (Fairbanks, Alaska) =

Former St. Joseph's Hospital in Fairbanks, Alaska

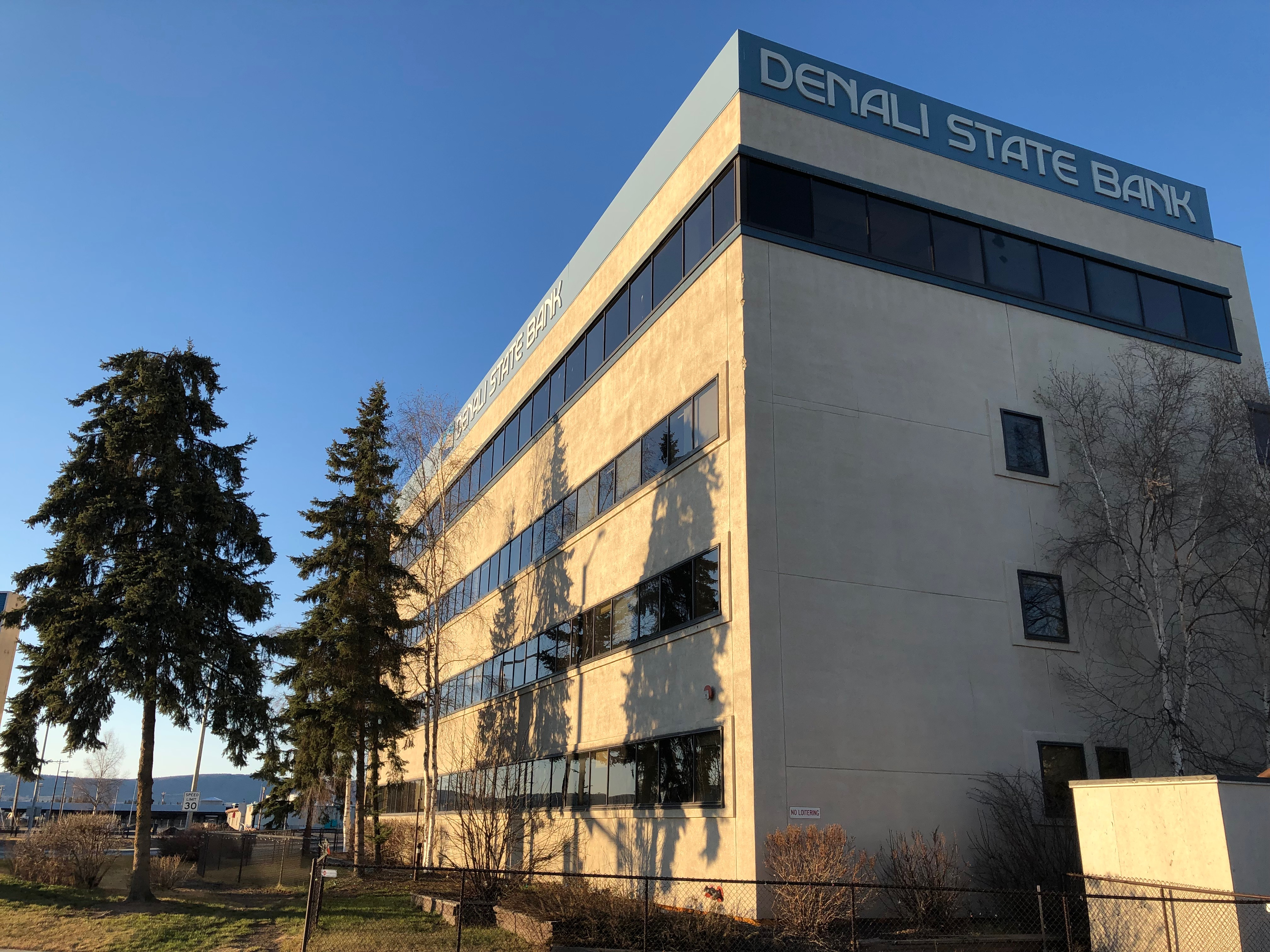
- Denali State Bank, former location of St. Joseph's Hospital

Geography
- Location: Fairbanks, Alaska, United States
- Coordinates: 64°50′45″N 147°43′17″W

History
- Opened: November 18, 1906
- Demolished: 1973

Links
- Lists: Hospitals in Alaska

St. Joseph's Hospital, the very first hospital in Fairbanks, Alaska was built in 1906.

== History ==
Fairbanks was a frontier town when a Jesuit priest named Rev. Francis M. Monroe decided to build a church and hospital. The church stood in the heart of town, while the hospital, also named St. Joseph's, was constructed on the north side of the Chena River, a little downstream from the church. Later the church would be moved across the river. Monroe's hospital was ready to admit its first patients on November 18, 1906, filling 35 of the 40 beds.

It was the first framed building in Fairbanks. All the other buildings were built of logs. The church closed the hospital in 1915. The next hospital was St. Joseph's. It was built by the Roman Catholic church. The St. Matthew's hospital was on one side of the Chena River and the St. Joseph's hospital was on the other side of the Chena River. St. Joseph's was almost out of town. St. Joseph's was opened on Thanksgiving Day in 1906. The hospital had 40 beds when it opened. The nuns of the Church were the nurses. They used to go out at night and lock up the hospital very, very, very tight. When somebody knocked on the door because they were sick, the nuns would peek out of the window before they let them in.

A new addition to St. Joseph's was built in 1951. This building is now the Denali State Bank. The old part of the hospital was torn down in 1973.

A view of St. Joseph's church and hospital before the church roof was changed and the belfry added. An article appearing in Jessen's Weekly, July 8, 1954, recounted the cost of building: “Following the discovery of gold by Felix Pedro, several thousand people rushed into the promising area and among them were many Catholics. The price of real estate and labor was beyond the means of the Jesuits, so a group of local men organized for the purpose of raising the necessary finances for a church. A rough 65-by-30-foot structure was erected at the cost of $6, 512. A keg of eight-penny nails cost $50 at the time. Father Monroe traveled all over the mining camps and around in Interior Alaska soliciting help and finally raised $4, 795. 75. This, added to the $3, 051 the committee of men had collected, enabled the missionary to pay off the debt and decorate the church and also install a small library along with his living quarters. Not a few people in the camp criticized Father severely for what they thought was too large a building, saying there would never be enough Catholics in Fairbanks to justify the size. ” In 1910, the population of Fairbanks was 3, 541 and growing.
