= Fermo Forti =

Italian painter and sculptor (1839–1911)

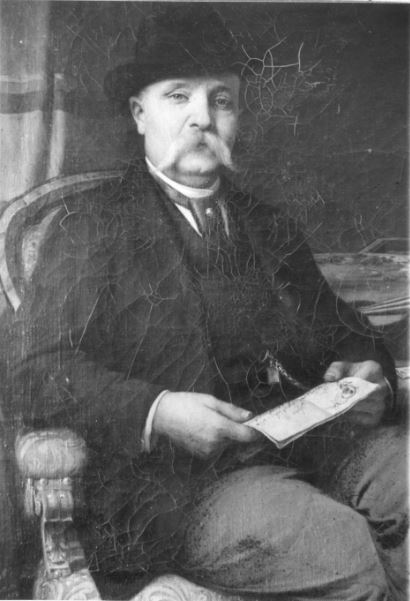
Self-portrait (1902)

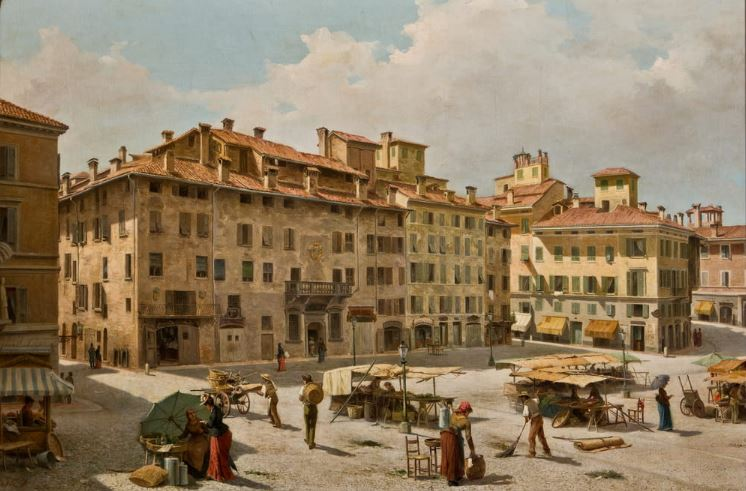
The Piazza Grande in Modena

Fermo Forti (3 February 1839, Carpi–24 February 1911, Carpi) was an Italian painter and sculptor; best known for his religious works. He also painted some historic and genre scenes in a Realist style.

== Biography ==
His father Giuseppe, a master mason, encouraged his son's artistic education by enrolling him in drawing classes at the local "Scuola Elementare Comunale di Disegno". In 1857, thank to grant from the municipality, he was able to study at the Accademia Atestina di Belle Arti in Modena, under the direction of Adeodato Malatesta. He was there that he developed a preference for religious portraiture.

Most of his earliest works were created for competitions at the Accademia. One of his first commissions was to provide decorations for the Church of Sant'Adriano III Papa in Spilamberto. In 1874, together with Lelio Rossi (1844–1907) and Albano Lugli, he embarked on a project to decorate the Carpi Cathedral, which would occupy him on and off for twenty years.

In 1888, he was named an Academician for painting classes at the Accademia. In 1898, he was named a member of their Examinations Commission. The following year, he was appointed to the "Municipal Commission of Homeland History and Fine Arts of Carpi", and later served as a City Councilor there. He died in 1911, shortly after his sixty-second birthday. His widow, Giovannina, had a funeral monument placed in the cathedral.

His other works include "The Gorgonian Martyrs" (1874) for the Church of San Niccolò in Carpi, "Purification of the Virgin" (1875) for the church of Panzano in Campogalliano, "Saint Anthony" for the former convent of San Rocco de Carpi, as well as sculptures in terracotta of the "Ascended Madonna" (1906), preserved in the Museo civico at the Castello dei Pio.
