= Fairbanks Exploration Company Housing =

Historic house in Alaska, United States

- F. E. Company Housing
- U.S. National Register of Historic Places
- U.S. Historic district
- U.S. Historic district – Contributing property
- Alaska Heritage Resources Survey
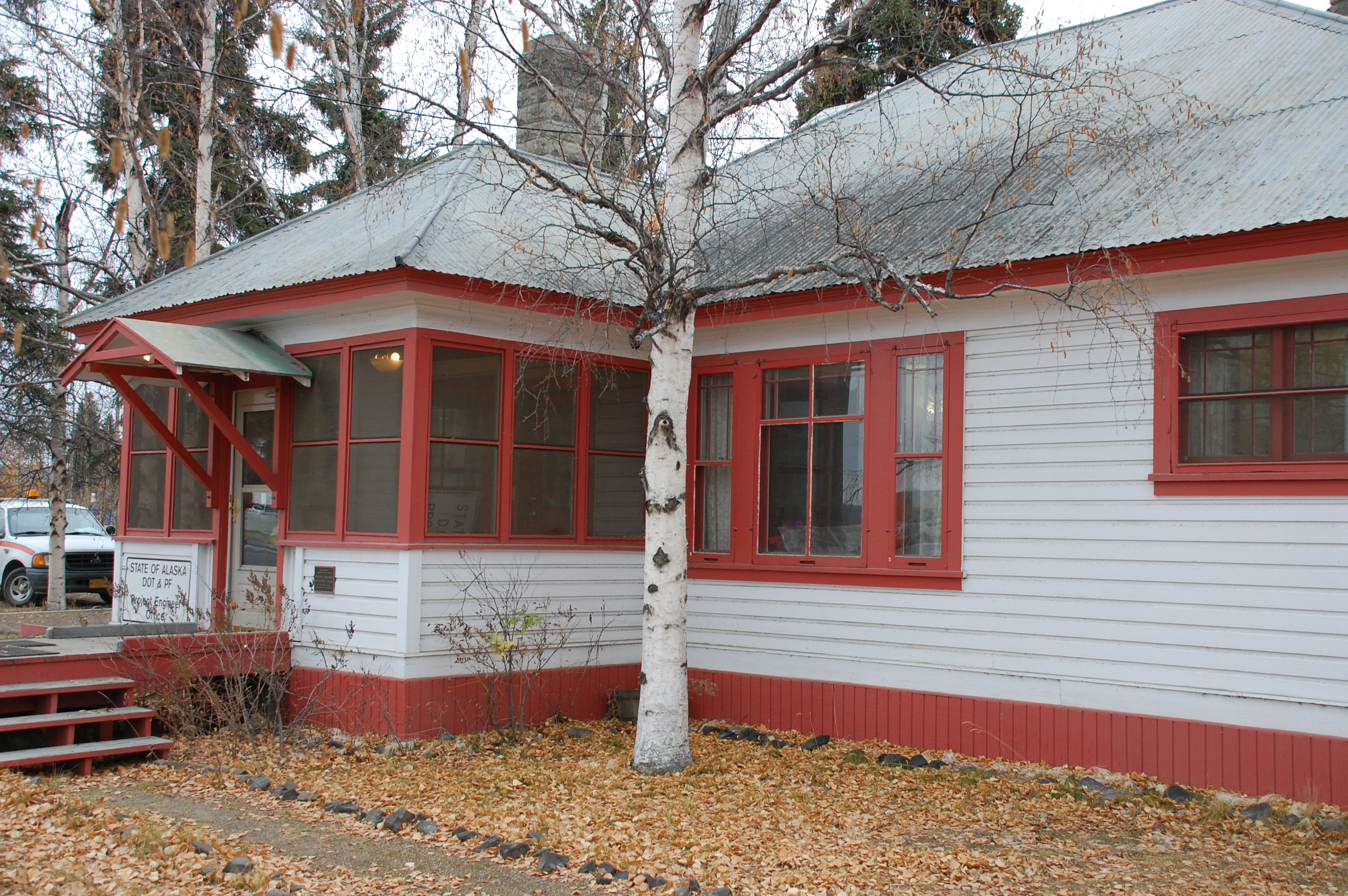
- 523 Illinois Street

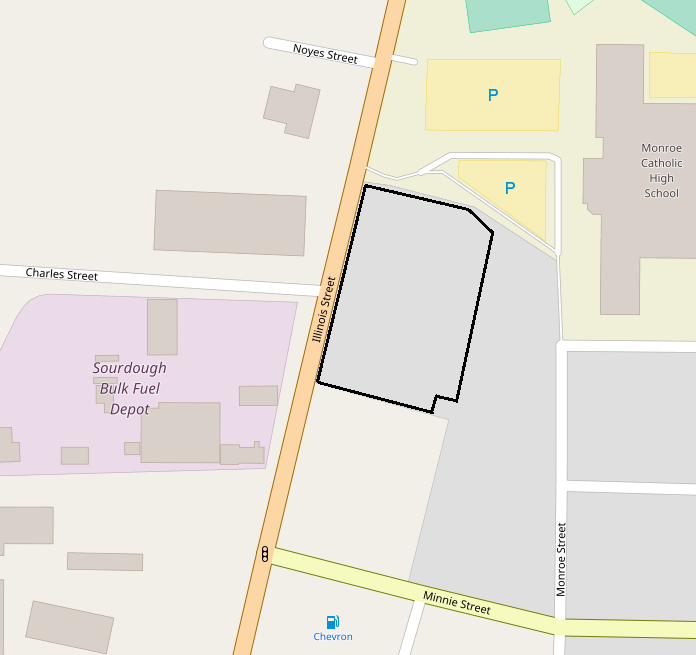
- Boundaries of Fairbanks Exploration Company Housing
- Location: 505, 507, 521, and 523 Illinois Street, Fairbanks, Alaska
- Coordinates: 64°51′2″N 147°43′6″W
- Area: 1.8 acres (0.73 ha)
- Built: 1927
- Built by: Fairbanks Exploration Company
- Architectural style: Bungalow/craftsman
- Part of: Illinois Street Historic District (ID01000966)
- NRHP reference No.: 97000400
- AHRS No.: FAI-334

Significant dates
- Added to NRHP: May 9, 1997
- Designated CP: September 14, 2001

The Fairbanks Exploration Company was the major economic force in the growth of Fairbanks, Alaska during its gold rush years in the early 20th century. In the 1920s the company built a number of housing units for its workers. A cluster of at least eight of these is known to have survived on the east side of Illinois Street, of which four have retained historical integrity. Located at 505, 507, 521, and 523 Illinois Street, they are all similarly built Bungalow-style wood-frame buildings, 1 1/2 stories in height, with a hip roof and projecting hipped wings. The complex includes a five-stall garage which served all four houses, as well as two greenhouses. At the time of their listing on the National Register of Historic Places in 1997, this group of houses was being rehabilitated for use as a bed and breakfast inn.

== See also ==
- National Register of Historic Places listings in Fairbanks North Star Borough, Alaska
- Mary Lee Davis House, used as housing for F.E. Company executives
