= Felix Pedro =

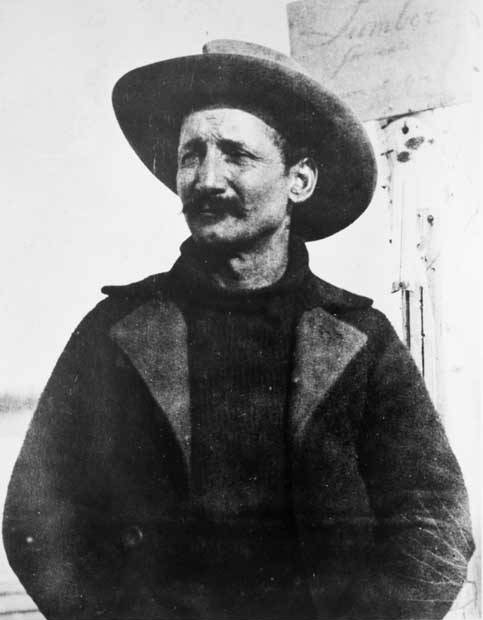
- Born: April 16, 1858; Fanano, Duchy of Modena
- Died: July 22, 1910 (aged 52); Fairbanks, Alaska, U.S.
- Other name: Felice Pedroni
- Occupation: Prospector
- Known for: Discovering gold in the Fairbanks area

Felice Pedroni (April 16, 1858 – July 22, 1910), commonly known by his Hispanicized alias Felix Pedro, was an Italian immigrant whose discovery of gold in Interior Alaska marked the beginning of the 1902 Fairbanks Gold Rush.

== Early life ==
Pedroni was born on April 16, 1858 to a family of subsistence farmers in the small village of Trignano, Italy, located in the municipality of Fanano in the Apennine Mountains. The youngest of six brothers, Pedroni immigrated to the United States in 1881 following the death of his father. He arrived in New York City and quickly assumed the name Felix Pedro.

Pedro traveled to New York City, Ohio, Washington, British Columbia, and the Yukon, working in each place until he earned enough to travel again. Once in Alaska, Pedro panned for gold in the Fortymile, the Piledriver Slough near present-day Salcha, and various other waterways, including the "Lost Creek" in which Pedro and his partner Tom Gilmore claimed to have found a sizable amount of gold in 1898, but were forced to abandon due to food shortage. Despite marking the spot and searching for it for the next three years, they were unable to find it again.

== Gold ==
On August 26, 1901, prospector E. T. Barnette and Captain Charles W. Adams ran the 150-foot (46 m) steamer Lavelle Young aground 8 miles (13 km) up the Chena River which they mistakenly believed to be a distributary which would allow them to detour upstream from the unnavigable Bates Rapids to their intended destination in Tanacross. In accordance with their agreement, Barnette, his wife Isabelle, five hired hands, and 130 tons of supplies were unloaded onto the riverbank. The crew quickly built two log cabins and a series of tents, establishing a trading post named Chena City.

Adams returned downstream, and Barnette had his first visitors only hours later. Pedro and Gilmore, still in search of the Lost Creek, were perched on a nearby slope and had seen the plumes of smoke from the departing steam-boat. They stumbled into the camp, bought supplies, and headed northward into the hills. At the request of James Wickersham the camp was renamed Fairbanks, after Senator Charles W. Fairbanks (R-Indiana), in March 1902.

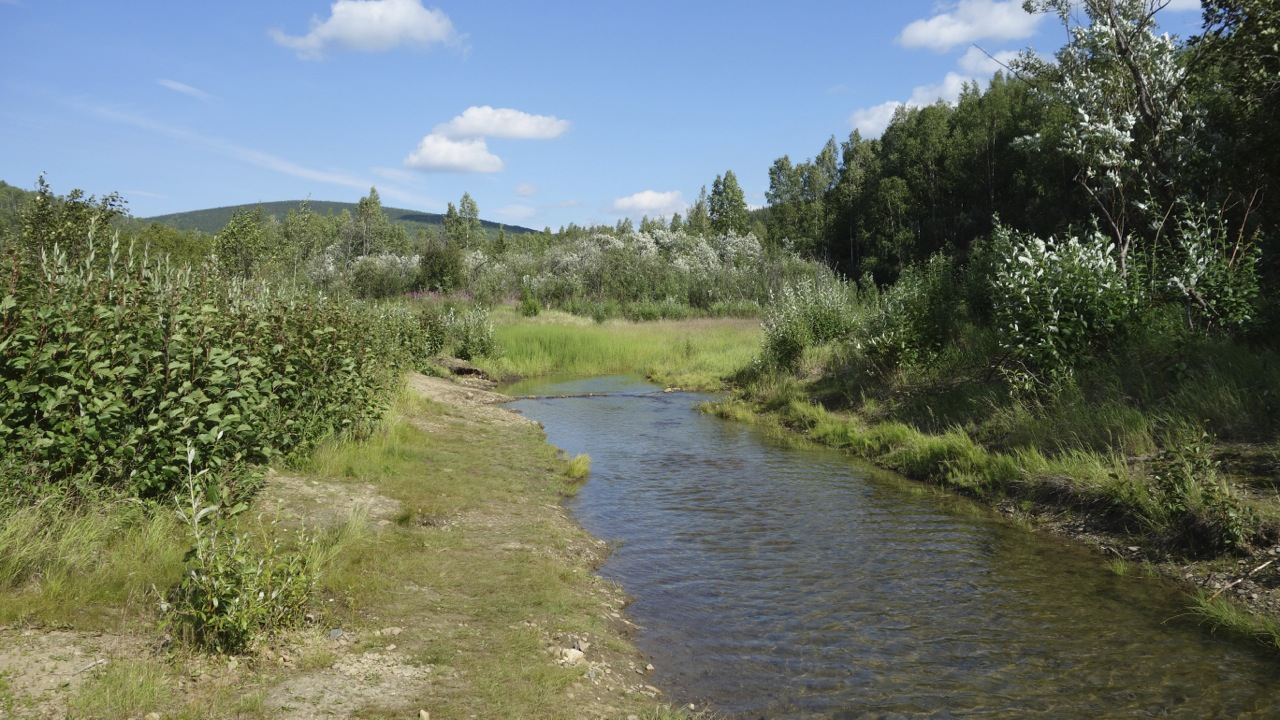
Pedro Creek in Tanana, Alaska. Felix Pedro's discovery of gold here in 1902 began the Alaskan gold rush.

Felix Pedro discovered gold in the Tanana Hills northeast of Fairbanks on or about July 22, 1902 in a small unnamed stream (now known as "Pedro Creek") northeast of Fairbanks, prompting him to exclaim "There's gold in them there hills", and triggering a full-scale gold rush.

Business was booming for Barnette, but he wanted more. He sent letters to Dawson City, which arrived in the dead of winter and were published in the Dawson Daily News January 3, 1903. This triggered an influx of over 1,000 more prospectors in −53 °F (−47 °C) temperatures. Fairbanks continued to grow, and by 1908 it was the largest city in Alaska.

== Death ==
Felix Pedro died on July 22, 1910, at age 52, at St. Joseph's Hospital in Fairbanks, reportedly of a heart attack. However, this was disputed by his business partner, Vincenzo Gambiani, who denied that Pedro was suffering any heart problems and suspected Pedro's widow, Mary Doran, of foul play. Years later, on his own death bed, Gambiani was asked once again about the death of Pedro. Unable to speak, he wrote only two words: moglie-veleno ("wife-poison").

Pedro's body was embalmed, shipped to San Francisco, and buried in nearby Colma. On October 12, 1972, Pedro's body was found, exhumed, and moved by Cortelloni Amato to Italy where an autopsy was performed, and the hair samples reportedly supported the conclusion that Pedroni was murdered. His remains were buried again in a small cemetery in Fanano.

== Legacy ==
In 1947 a Felix Pedro monument was erected at mile 16.1 of the Steese Highway near Pedro Creek. His original claim site, where the marker is located, is listed on the National Register of Historic Places.

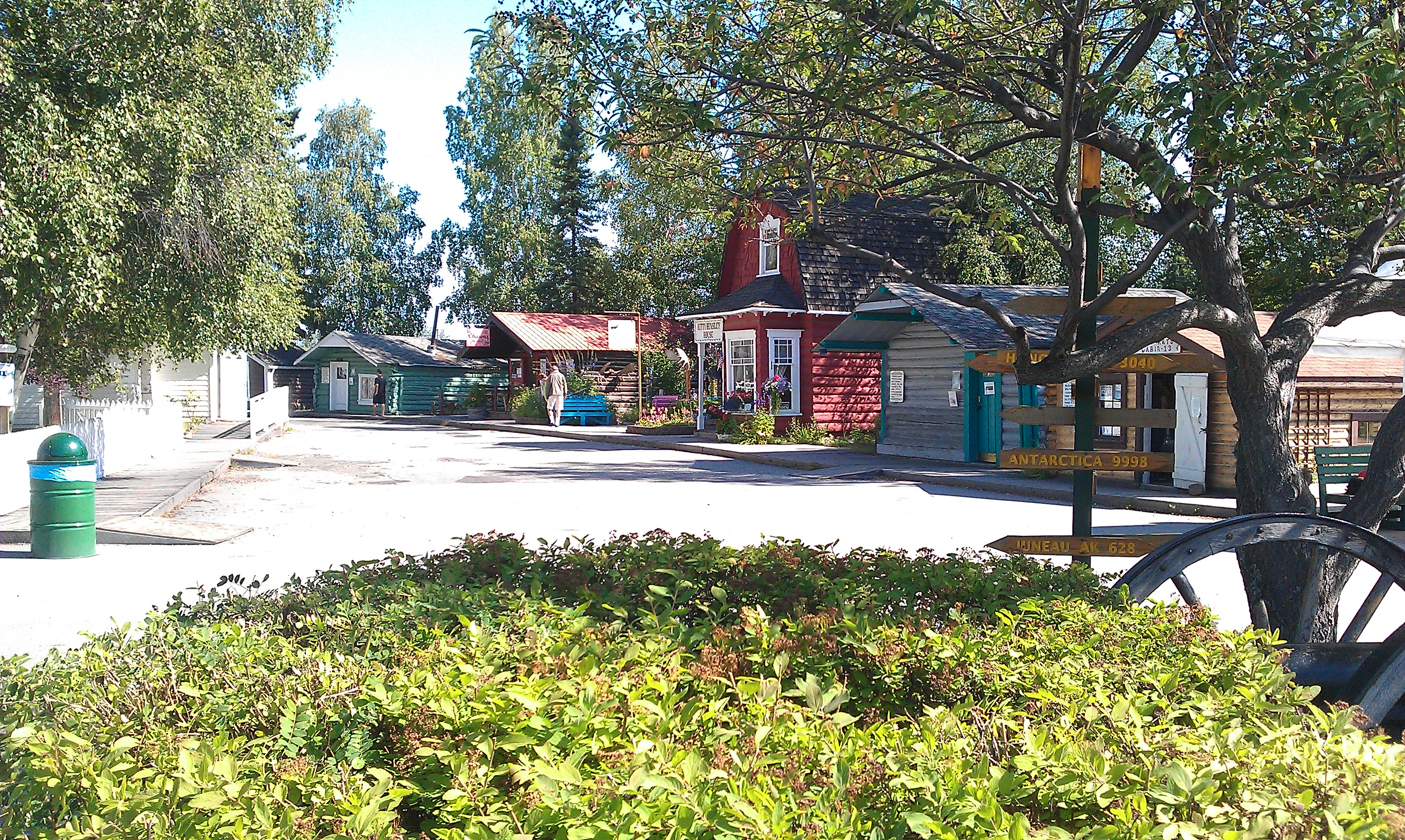
Pioneer Park in Fairbanks

The Alaskaland park in mid-town Fairbanks was opened in 1967 to commemorate 100th anniversary of the Alaska Purchase. However, on July 22, 2002, the presumed 100th anniversary of Pedro's gold discovery (noted in Alaska as "Felix Pedro Day"), the Alaskaland park was officially renamed Pioneer Park. Pioneer Park's annual Golden Days festival at Pioneer Park includes a Felix Pedro look-alike contest.

Also on this date, Fairbanks and Fanano became sister cities.
