= Fairbanks Exploration Company Machine Shop =

- F. E. Company Machine Shop
- U.S. National Register of Historic Places
- U.S. Historic district – Contributing property
- Alaska Heritage Resources Survey
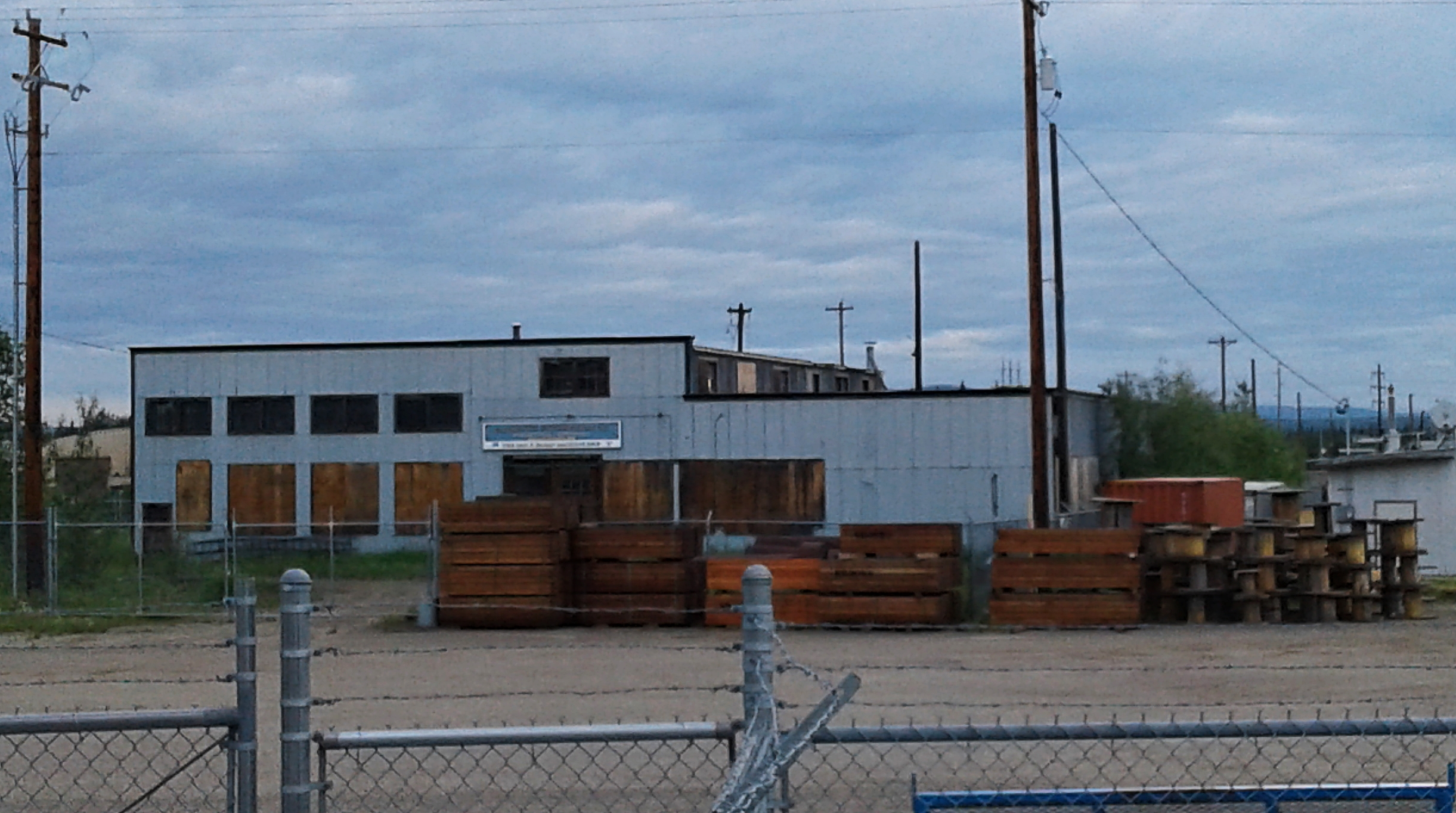

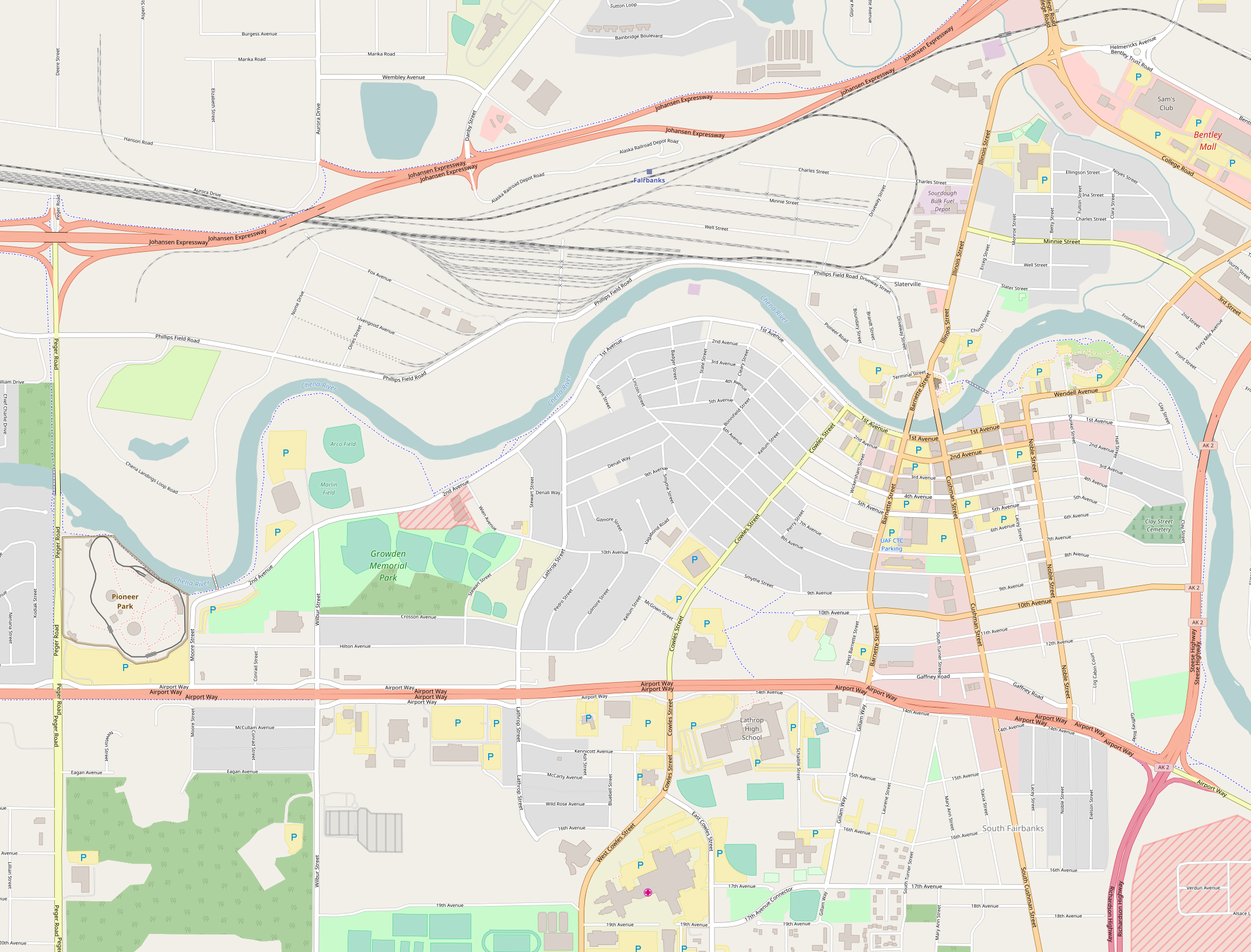
- Location within Downtown Fairbanks Location within Alaska
- Location: behind 612 Illinois Street, Fairbanks, Alaska
- Coordinates: 64°51′7″N 147°43′20″W
- Area: less than one acre
- Built: 1927
- Built by: United States Smelting and Refining Company
- Part of: Illinois Street Historic District (ID01000966)
- NRHP reference No.: 95001164
- AHRS No.: FAI-445

Significant dates
- Added to NRHP: October 12, 1995
- Designated CP: September 14, 2001

The Fairbanks Exploration Company Machine Shop is a historic machine shop in Fairbanks, Alaska, United States. Located behind the Fairbanks Exploration Company (F.E. Company) administration building at 612 Illinois Street, it is a large single-story steel-frame structure, built in 1927 to serve the company's nearby gold mining operations. Its easternmost section is 16 feet (4.9 m) high, while that on the west is 20 feet (6.1 m) high, in order to accommodate belt-driven equipment and cranes. A tall double door at the center of the east facade is the main entrance. The front of the building housed large belt-driven lathes, while the center had a welding shop, drill presses, and a tool room. A blacksmithy in the back had a sand floor. The building was used by the F.E. Company between 1927 and 1964.

The building was listed on the National Register of Historic Places in 1995.

== See also ==
- National Register of Historic Places listings in Fairbanks North Star Borough, Alaska
