= Teatro Filodrammatici, Piacenza =

Coordinates: 45.04921°N 9.69149°E

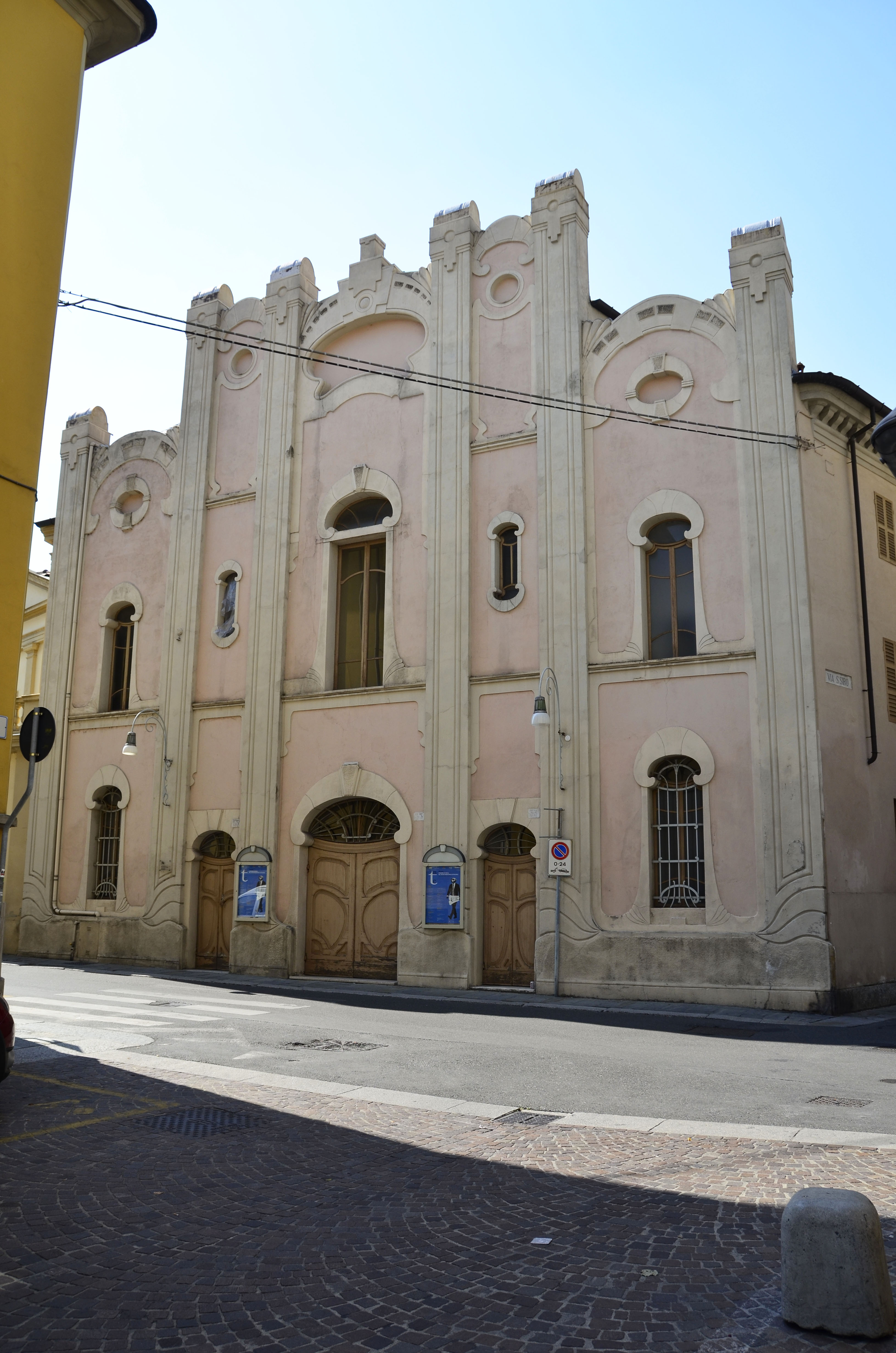
Facade of theater.

The Teatro Filodrammatici of Piacenza is the Art Nouveau-style theater in the city, located on Via Santa Franca #33, in Piacenza, Italy.

== Description ==
The site originally housed the church and part of the Cistercian monastery of Santa Franca, built in 1549. The church was dedicated and housed relics of the saint. The order was suppressed during Napoleonic rule, and during the next decades the buildings had diverse secular uses, including as a barracks. The monastery was converted into the Music Conservatory Giuseppe Nicolini. The Societa Filodrammatica was a social group, officially recognized in 1825 by the government of Duchess Maria Louise d’Austria. In the early 20th-century, they were granted the site of the church to build a theater. The facade was designed by the engineer Gazzola. The theater was inaugurated in 1908 and remained in use till the 1980s, till the roof began to show deterioration, and the theater was closed. After years of restoration, the theater was re-opened in 2000. The interior seats nearly 300 spectators.
