= Noyes Slough =

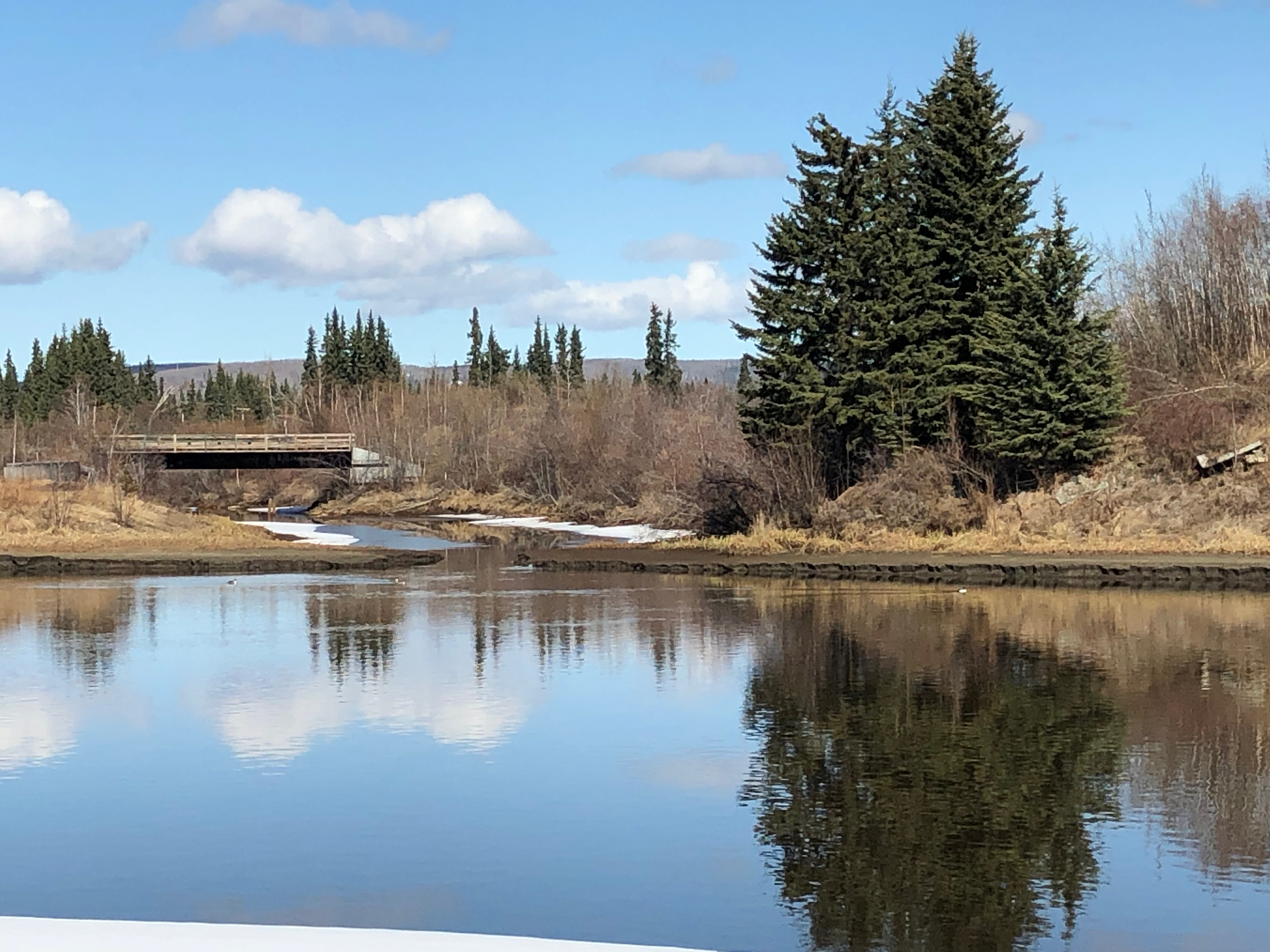
- The outlet of Noyes Slough into the Chena River as viewed from the Chena River State Recreation Site.

- Location of mouth

Location
- Country: United States
- State: Alaska
- City: Fairbanks

Physical characteristics
- Mouth
  - coordinates: 64°50′34″N 147°48′25″W
- Length: 7 mi (11 km)

Basin features
- River system: Chena River

Noyes Slough (Lower Tanana: Trothttheetkhun'a) is a secondary channel (or "slough") of the Chena River contained entirely within the city limits of Fairbanks, Alaska. It is approximately 7 miles (11 km) long and separates the Garden Island district of Fairbanks from the rest of the town. During the summer, the slough is used by canoeists and waterfowl. In the winter, the slough freezes and is used by cross-country skiers, snowshoers, and mushers. It forms part of the route for the annual Open North American Sled Dog Championship and the Iron Dog snowmobile race, each of which end in downtown Fairbanks.

The slough is named after Fred Noyes, who ran a sawmill on the slough prior to the founding of Fairbanks. The first mention of the name appears in a 1905 mining district map.

The Noyes Slough is nicknamed Deadman's Slough after Vuko Perovich killed a man who was found in a partially burned cabin near the slough.

== See also ==
- List of rivers of Alaska
