= Sant'Agostino, Piacenza =

Former Roman Catholic church in Emilia Romagna, Italy

Coordinates: 45°2′50.71″N 9°41′34.1″E

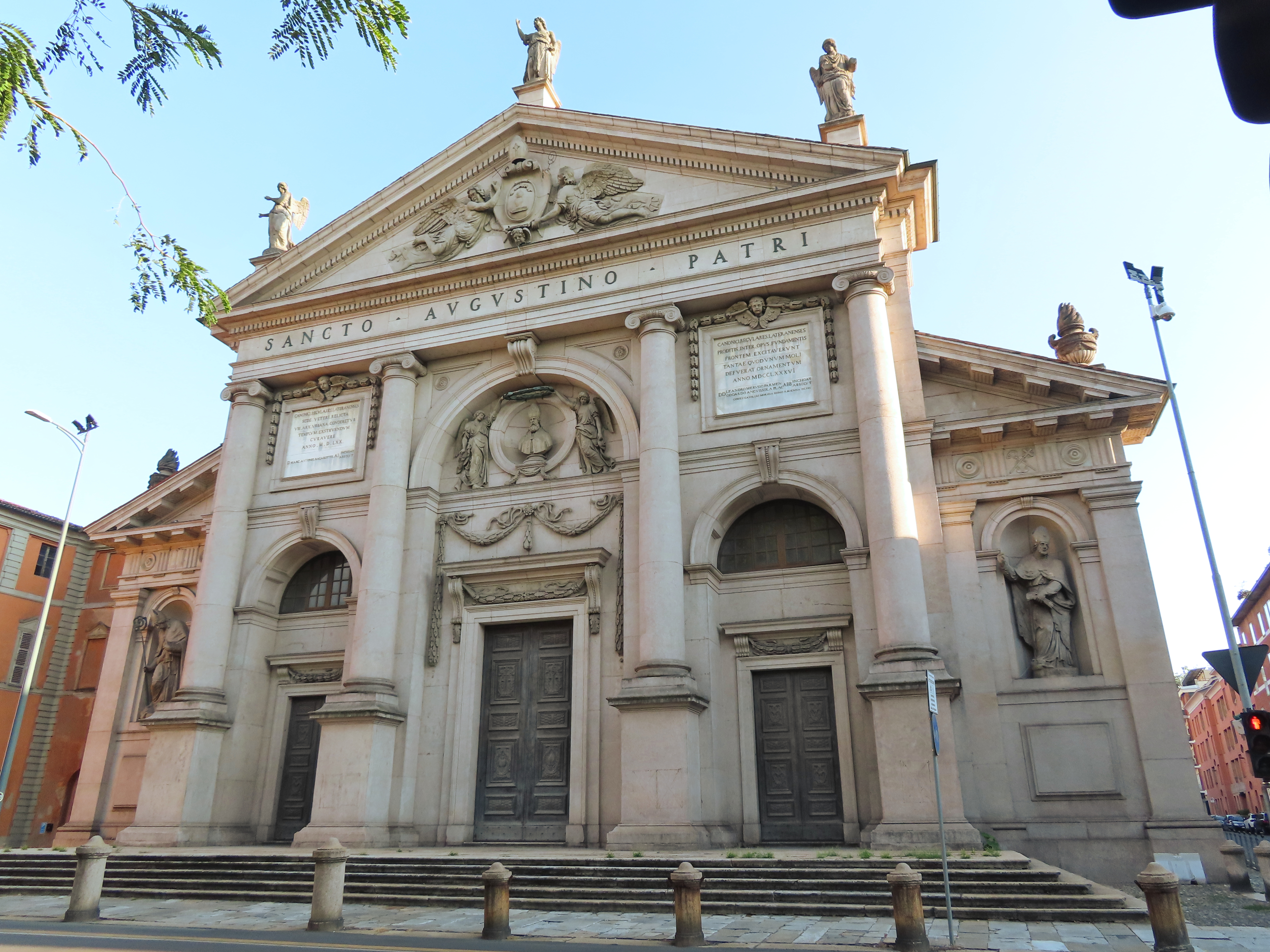
Facade of church

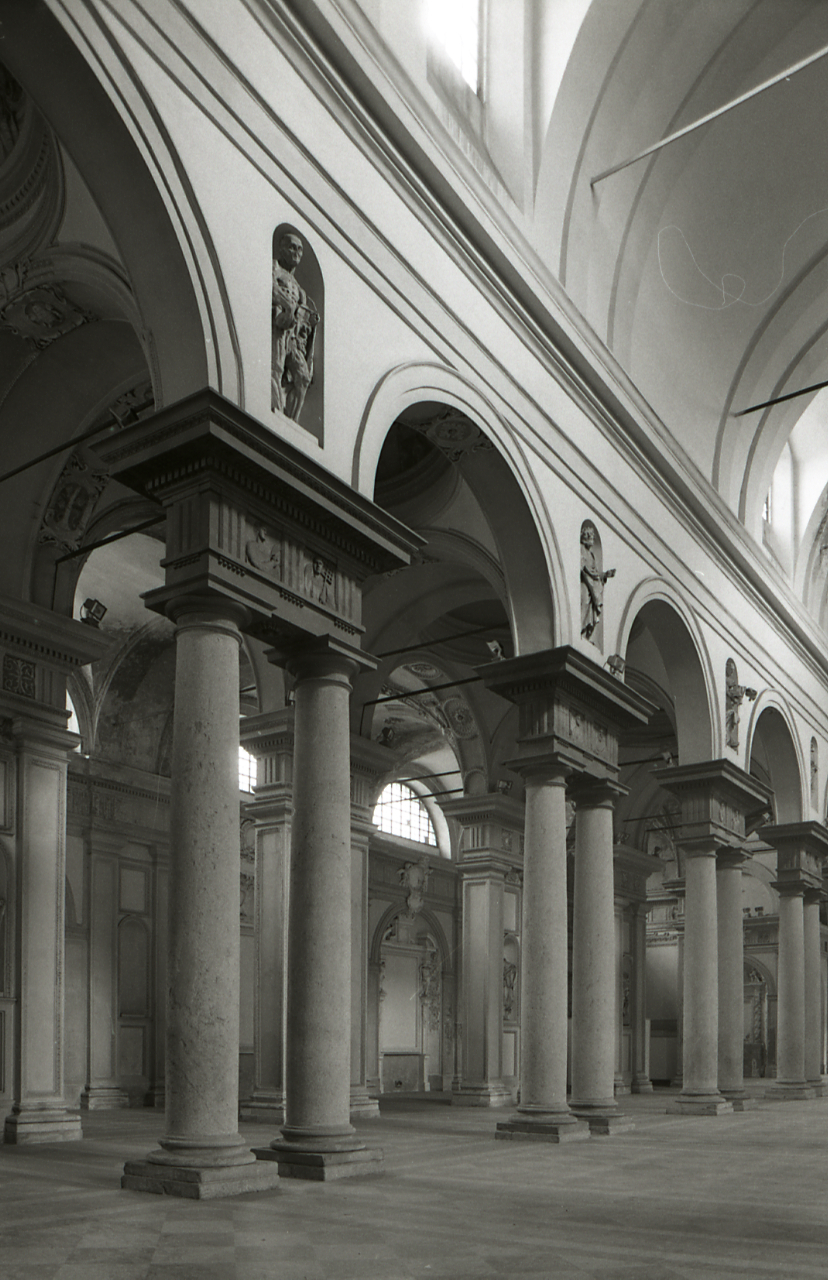
Interior of the church

Sant'Agostino is a Renaissance style, former Roman Catholic church, located at the intersection of the Avenue Farnese and via Giordani in Piacenza, region of Emilia Romagna, Italy.

== History ==
The adjacent convent was built during 1569-1573 by the Canons Regular of the Lateran, but the church building was not completed till 1608. The Lateransi had been in Piacenza since 1431, but had been evicted by the Pier Luigi Farnese from their prior holdings at the Monastery of San Marco. The neoclassical façade of the church was completed only in 1792 by Camillo Morigia. The facade recalls the Roman triumphal arches, with statues and a pediment decorated with angels and garlands. At the end of the 18th-century, the monastery came to be used as a military hospital. In 1798, the contents of this wealthy convent were auctioned to raise money to pay Napoleonic demands. This included a large library at the monastery. In 1816, the monastery was converted into a school for young women.

In 1828, the convent and church were bought by the city. After deconsecration and until the Second World War, the church and the monastery was used as barracks, hospital, and warehouse. The interior of the church is decorated with frescoes by Trotti; Procaccini; Nuvoloni; Bartolomeo Baderna; Gian Paolo Lomazzo (Refectory, 1567); Antonio Cifrondi; and Rubini . The site is now deconsecrated and was used for exhibitions until 1985, and again since 2019.
