= Fanano =

- Comune
- Comune di Fanano
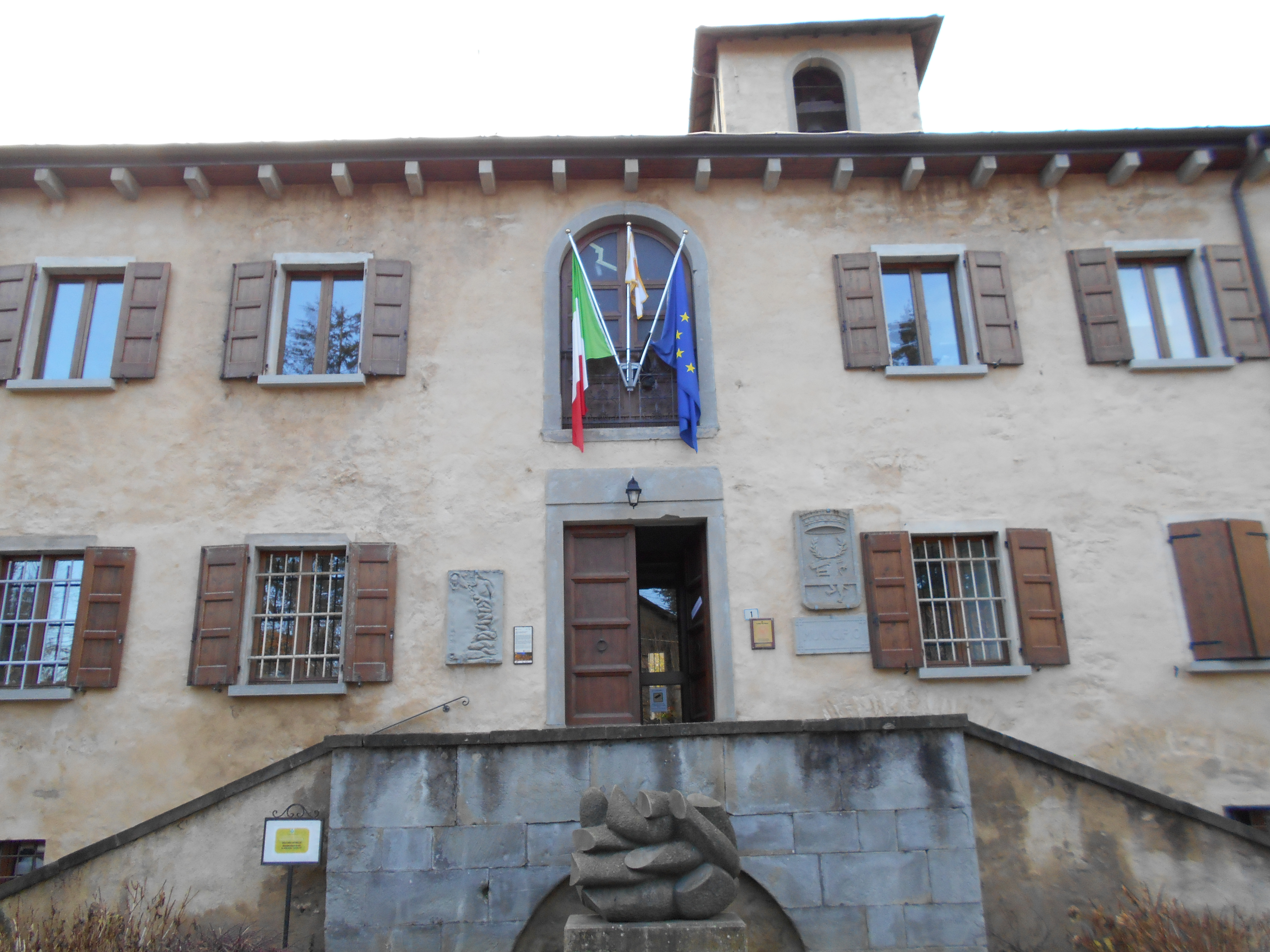
- Town hall

- Coat of arms

- Location within Italy Location within Emilia-Romagna
- Coordinates: 44°12′N 10°47′E
- Country: Italy
- Region: Emilia-Romagna
- Province: Modena (MO)
- Frazioni: Canevare, Fellicarolo, Ospitale, Serrazzone, Trignano, Trentino, Lotta

Government
  - Mayor: Stefano Muzzarelli

Area
  - Total: 89.91 km^{2} (34.71 sq mi)
- Elevation: 640 m (2,100 ft)

Population (31 July 2017)
  - Total: 2,958
  - Density: 32.90/km^{2} (85.21/sq mi)
- Demonym: Fananesi
- Time zone: UTC+1 (CET)
  - Summer (DST): UTC+2 (CEST)
- Postal code: 41021
- Dialing code: 0536
- Website: Official website

Fanano (Frignanese: Fanân) is a comune (municipality) in the Province of Modena in the Italian region Emilia-Romagna, located about 50 kilometres (31 mi) southwest of Bologna and about 50 kilometres (31 mi) south of Modena.

Fanano borders the following municipalities: Cutigliano, Fiumalbo, Lizzano in Belvedere, Montese, San Marcello Piteglio, Sestola.

It is located in the Modenese Apennines. The Monte Cimone is in its territory.

== Main sights ==
- Watch tower
- San Silvestro, a Baroque church
- San Colombano, another church
- Oratorio della Beata Vergine delle Grazie
- Santa Chiara
- San Francesco
- San Giuseppe Sposo di Maria
- Santa Chiara

== People ==
- Italo Bortolotti, painter
- Felix Pedro, born in the small village of Trignano, part of the comune of Fanano

== Sister cities ==
- Fairbanks, United States
- Ladd, Illinois, United States
