= Interior Yukon–Alaska alpine tundra =

Interior Yukon-Alaska alpine tundra
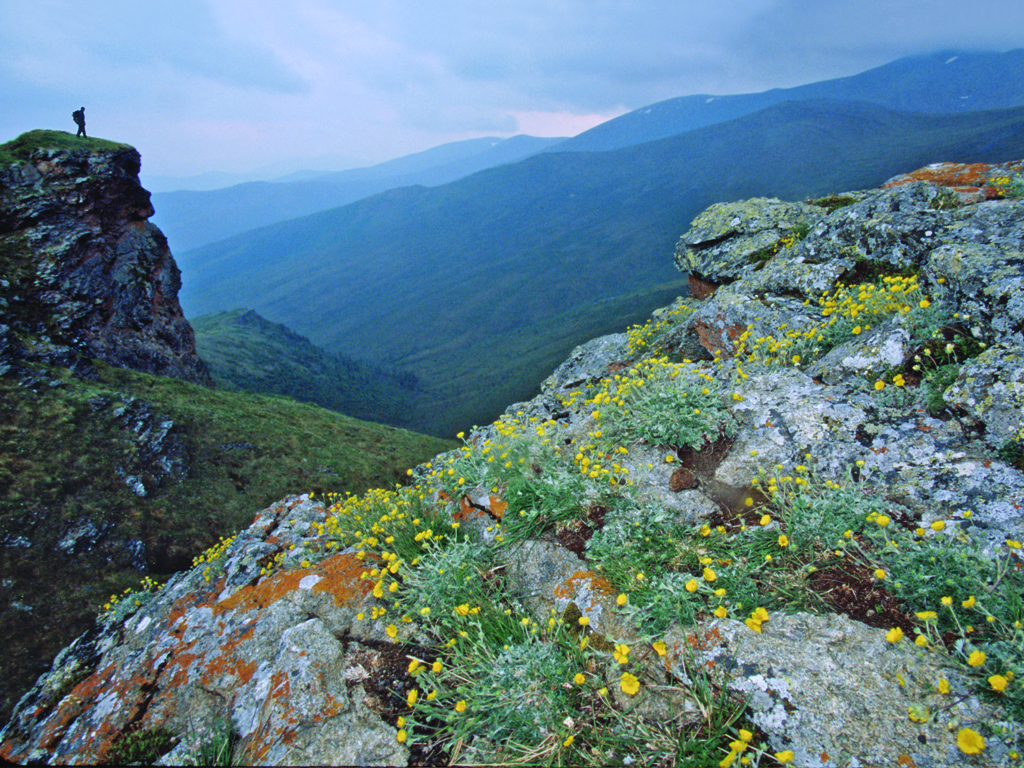
- Eagle Summit, Steese National Conservation Area, Alaska

- Ecoregion territory (in green)

Ecology
- Realm: Nearctic
- Biome: Tundra

Geography
- Area: 233,172 km^{2} (90,028 sq mi)
- Country: United States, Canada
- Coordinates: 64.75°N 143.75°W

The Interior Yukon–Alaska alpine tundra ecoregion (WWF ID: NA1111) covers alpine, sub-alpine, and boreal forest areas along the cordillera (chain of mountain ranges) of Interior Alaska and south-central Yukon Territory. Geologically, they are the disjunct uplands of the Yukon–Tanana terrane plus a southern extension of the Brooks Range. The cover is extensive 'dark taiga' of closed spruce forest, open forest of other species (aspen, willow, pine, fir), and alpine vegetation at higher altitudes. The region is mostly wilderness and relatively untouched by human development.

== Location and description ==
Interior Alaska is between the Alaska Range to the south and the Brooks Range to the north. The mountains of this interior region include the Kuskokwim Mountains in the western interior, the Ray Mountains north of Tanana, Alaska and Phillip Smith Mountains (southern spur of the Brooks Range), and the White Mountains (Alaska) that run in an arc north and east of Fairbanks. Collectively, this physiographic province is known as the Yukon-Tanana Uplands, geologically the Yukon–Tanana terrane.

The valleys below these ridges are of the 'Interior Alaska-Yukon lowland taiga' ecoregion, with the Yukon River on the north and the Tanana River on the south. The mean elevation is 837 metres (2,746 ft), the highest is 2,745 metres (9,006 ft).

== Climate ==
The climate of the ecoregion is Tundra climate (Köppen climate classification ET), a local climate in which at least one month has an average temperature high enough to melt snow (0 °C (32 °F)), but no month with an average temperature in excess of 10 °C (50 °F). The area is affected by a rain shadow effect caused by the Alaska Range to the south screening storms from the Gulf of Alaska. Average annual precipitation at Fairbanks is 287 mm/year; precipitation may reach 600 mm/year in the higher elevations. Permafrost is found at the higher elevations and more northerly extents of the ecoregion.

== Flora and fauna ==
The most common trees are white spruce (Picea glauca) and black spruce (Picea mariana). 32% of the region is closed needle-leaf evergreen forest, 26% is other types of open and closed forest, 20% shrub, 16% herbaceous vegetation, and rest bare ground or water.

Mammals of the area include caribou (Rangifer tarandus), grizzly bear (Ursus arctos), black bear (Ursus americanus), Dall's sheep (Ovis dalli), moose (Alces alces), beaver (Castor canadensis), red fox (Vulpes fulva), wolf (Canis lupus), and hare (genus Lepus).

== Protected areas ==
Over 17% of the ecoregion is officially protected. About 85% of the ecoregion is estimated to remain intact. The protected areas include:

- Yukon–Charley Rivers National Preserve
- Chena River State Recreation Area
- Steese National Conservation Area
- White Mountains National Recreation Area

== See also ==
- List of ecoregions in Canada (WWF)
- List of ecoregions in the United States (WWF)
