= Chena River =

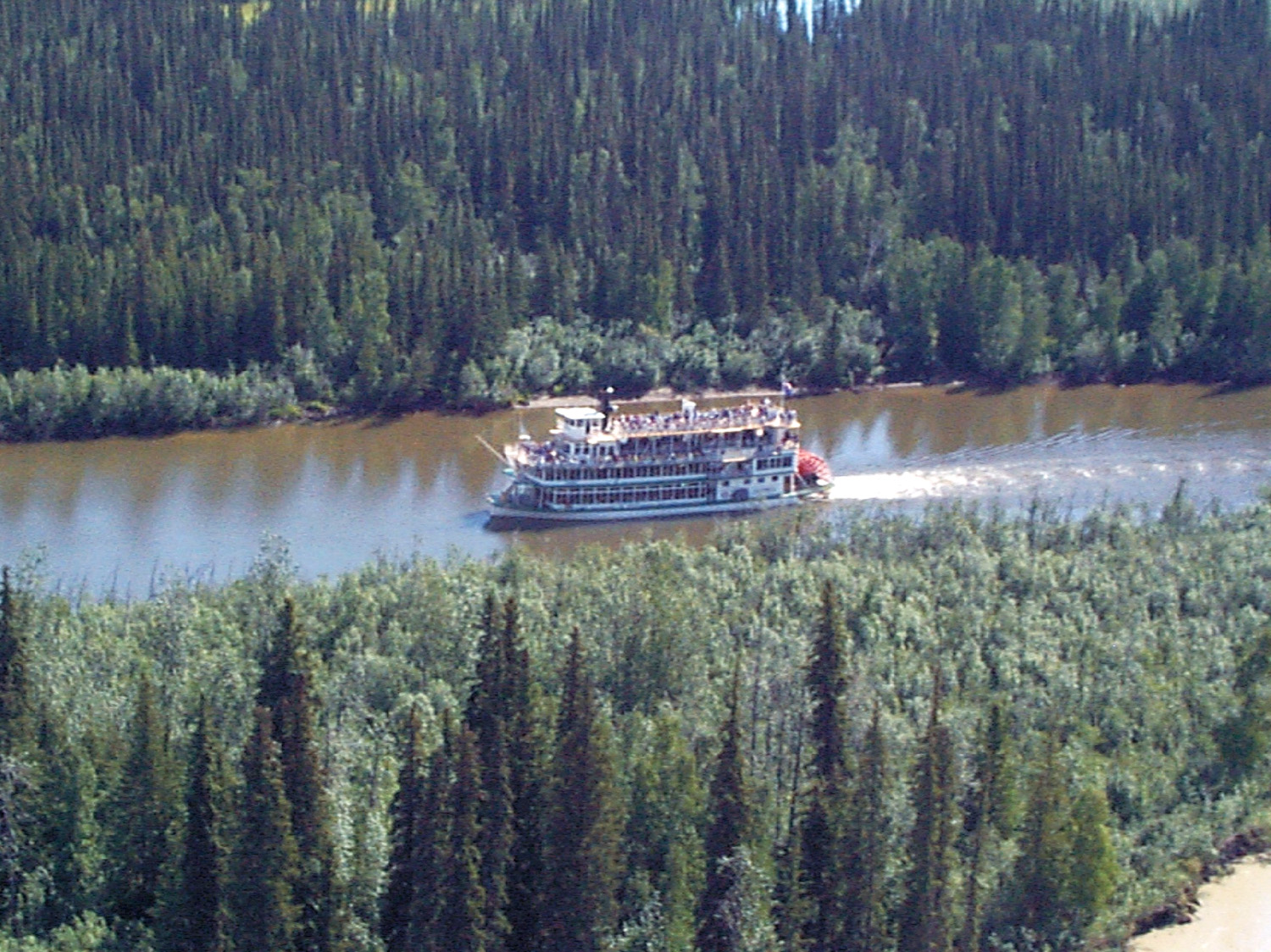
- A paddle-wheel steamer on the Chena River near Fairbanks

- Location of the mouth of the Chena River in Alaska
- Native name: Ch'eno' (Lower Tanana)

Location
- Country: United States
- State: Alaska
- Borough: Fairbanks North Star

Physical characteristics
- Source: confluence of the river's north and west forks
  - location: near Chena Hot Springs
  - coordinates: 65°03′18″N 146°10′45″W
  - elevation: 1,024 ft (312 m)
- Mouth: Tanana River
  - location: 6.5 miles (10.5 km) west-southwest of Fairbanks
  - coordinates: 64°47′44″N 147°54′43″W
  - elevation: 423 ft (129 m)
- Length: 100 mi (160 km)
- Basin size: 1,980 sq mi (5,100 km^{2})
- Discharge
  - location: Fairbanks
  - average: 1,336 cu ft/s (37.8 m^{3}/s)
  - minimum: 120 cu ft/s (3.4 m^{3}/s)
  - maximum: 74,400 cu ft/s (2,110 m^{3}/s)

The Chena River (/ˈtʃiːnə/; Lower Tanana: Ch'eno' "river of something (game)") is a 100-mile (160 km) tributary of the Tanana River in the Interior region of the U.S. state of Alaska. It flows generally west from the White Mountains to the Tanana River near the city of Fairbanks, which is built on both sides of the river. The Tanana empties into the 2,300-mile (3,700 km) long Yukon River.

Named tributaries of the Chena River include the North Fork, South Fork, West Fork, Middle (East) Fork and the Little Chena River. The Chena River State Recreation Area surrounds much of the upper half of the main stem. The Chena River is used for recreational fishing and boating. During the winter months, it is also traveled by snowmachines and mushers (sled dogs).

The Chena River Lakes Flood Control Project dam is about 40 miles (64 km) up the Chena River from Fairbanks. The dam was built in response to the 1967 Fairbanks flood, which inundated much of the city. When closed, the dam impounds water and, when the inflow is high enough, diverts it about 8 miles (13 km) to the Tanana River near North Pole, upstream of Fairbanks and the natural mouth of the Chena.

== Fish ==
The Chena River supports populations of many fish species, including Arctic grayling, burbot, chum salmon, humpback whitefish, king salmon, least cisco, longnose suckers, northern pike, round whitefish, and sheefish. Easily accessible from Fairbanks, the Chena is the most popular sport-fishing river in interior Alaska.

Overfishing for grayling reduced their number in the Chena to "dangerous levels" by the mid-1980s. In the 21st century, sport fishing for grayling, which grow in length to 18 inches (46 cm) in the upper river, is limited to catch and release.

== Boating ==
Easy access to the river from Chena Hot Springs Road, the Chena River Recreation Area, four bridges, and elsewhere make a wide variety of float trips possible. Most of the river is rated Class I (easy) on the International Scale of River Difficulty; however, the upper reaches along the North Fork near Chena Hot Springs are "extremely swift" with few safe eddies and are rated Class II (medium). High water increases these difficulty ratings.

Dangers on the North Fork include a much narrower channel than that of the main stem, possible logjams, overhanging vegetation, and shallows, any of which may require a portage. Dangers below that include possible overhangs, logjams, and channel braiding. In the early season (June), boaters may encounter ice jams anywhere along the river.

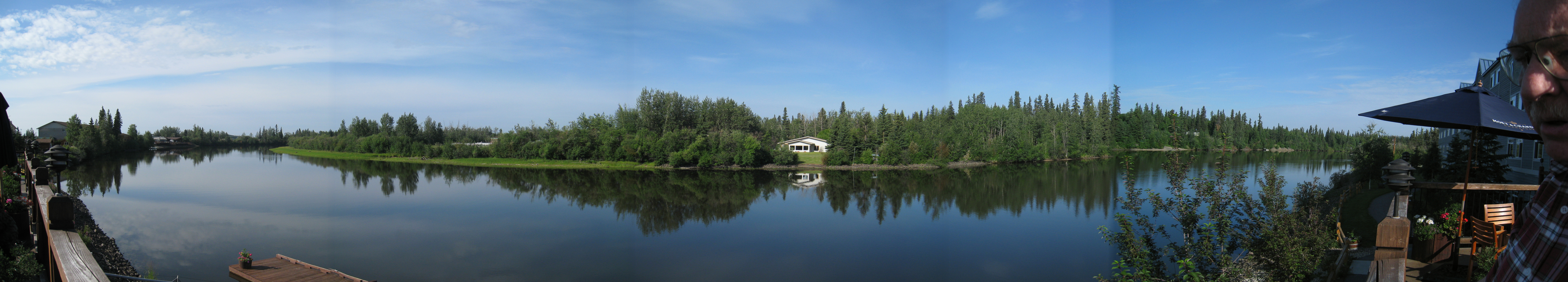
A panorama from the banks of the Chena River in Fairbanks

== See also ==
- List of rivers of Alaska
