= Beaver Creek (Yukon River tributary) =

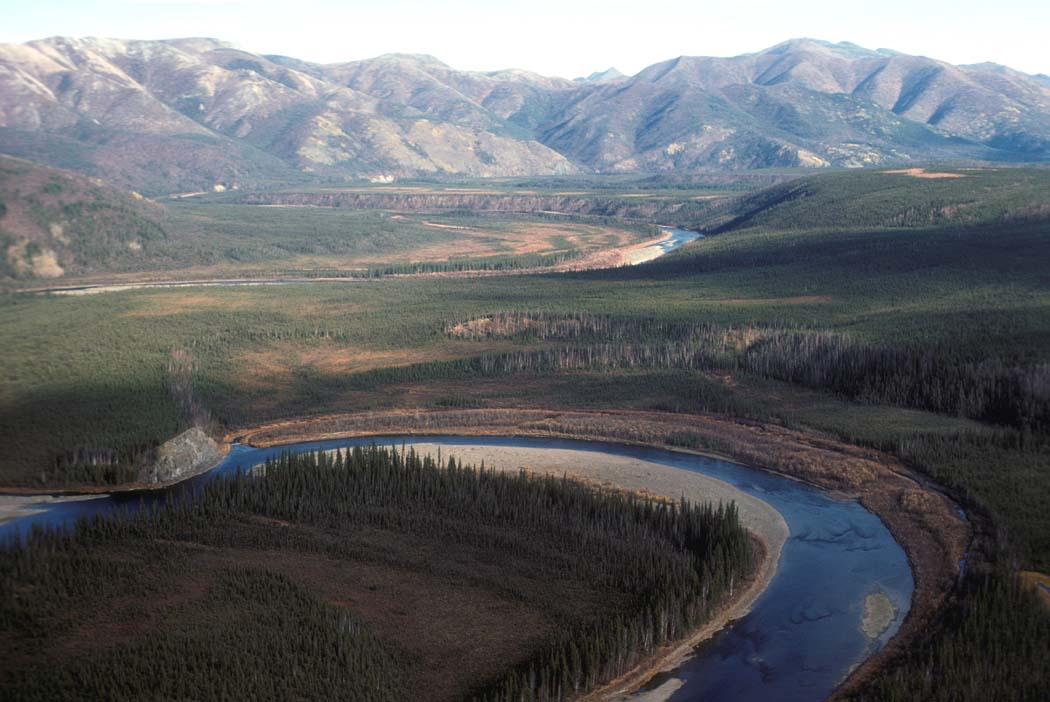
- Beaver Creek in Yukon Flats

- Location of the mouth of Beaver Creek in Alaska
- Native name: Taatthee Niign (Upper Tanana)

Location
- Country: United States
- State: Alaska
- Census Area: Yukon–Koyukuk

Physical characteristics
- Source: confluence of Champion and Bear creeks
  - location: White Mountains National Recreation Area
  - coordinates: 65°24′56″N 146°59′04″W
- Mouth: Yukon River
  - location: south-southwest (downstream) of Beaver, Yukon Flats National Wildlife Refuge
  - coordinates: 66°14′19″N 147°31′58″W
  - elevation: 335 ft (102 m)
- Length: 180 mi (290 km)

National Wild and Scenic Rivers System
- Type: Wild 127 miles (204 km)
- Designated: December 2, 1980

Beaver Creek (Upper Tanana: Taatthee Niign) is a 180-mile (290 km) tributary of the Yukon River in the U.S. state of Alaska. The creek begins at the confluence of Champion and Bear creeks in the White Mountains National Recreation Area, about 50 miles (80 km) north of Fairbanks. From there it flows west around the southern end of the White Mountains, then northeast into the Yukon Flats National Wildlife Refuge, then west into the Yukon River downstream of Beaver.

In 1980, The Alaska National Interest Lands Conservation Act designated the upper 127 miles (204 km) of Beaver Creek as part of the National Wild and Scenic Rivers System. Most of this lies within the recreation area, but the last 16 miles (26 km) are in the wildlife refuge.

== Description ==
Beaver Creek flows from its headwaters through thick forest of white spruce and paper birch forests and tundra on the high slopes of the White Mountains, where limestone peaks reach 3,176 feet (968 m) on the creek's north and east side. The creek has plentiful gravel bars, and willows grow on its banks.

The lower portion of the creek follows a very convoluted course through Yukon Flats, an area that contains thousands of lakes. Geographical features of these lowlands include sloughs and oxbow lakes. Beaver Creek is part of an active alluvial stream system in one of the most productive waterfowl breeding areas in North America and the most productive in Alaska.

== Recreation ==
The most common way to visit lower Beaver Creek is to float down from upstream, although it is possible to land small aircraft on the stream's gravel bars. The upper creek can be reached via Nome Creek, which flows into Beaver Creek a few miles from its origin. Nome Creek is accessible by highway. The lower reaches of Beaver Creek can also be accessed by boating upstream from the Yukon River, if the water level is medium to high.

The entire creek is rated Class I (easy) on the International Scale of River Difficulty and can be floated in a variety of watercraft. The Nome Creek approach involves difficult paddling in a winding, narrow channel with shallows and overhanging vegetation. However, Beaver Creek itself is 75 to 150 feet (23 to 46 m) wide and 2 to 4 feet (0.6 to 1.2 m) deep from the confluence with Nome Creek to the confluence with Victoria Creek, more than 100 miles (160 km) further downstream. Below that, in the wildlife refuge, the river becomes even wider and deeper, with broad gravel bars. Overhanging or partly submerged trees, stumps, and logs pose a hazard to boaters.

Sports fishing for northern pike and Arctic grayling along Beaver Creek can be "outstanding", according to Alaska Fishing. The larger pike frequent the lower reaches of the creek as well as sloughs, ponds, and oxbow lakes in the Yukon Flats. Grayling prefer the headwaters.

== See also ==
- List of rivers of Alaska
