= Tolovana Hot Springs =

Thermal springs

- Interactive map of Tolovana Hot Springs
- Location: 950 feet
- Coordinates: 65°16′00″N 148°52′00″W
- Type: geothermal
- Temperature: 140 °F (60 °C)

Tolovana Hot Springs is the most remote of the "big 4" hot springs in the Tolovana River Valley of Alaska.

== Location/Geography ==
Tolovana Hot Springs is located 45 air miles (72.5 km) northwest of Fairbanks in the Tolovana River Valley.

== Description ==
In addition to the hot springs, there is a cold spring from which to draw drinking water. Three cabins exist on the site which are accessed by an eleven-mile (16-km) trail beginning at milepost 93 of the Elliott Highway. The trail goes up and over the 2,316-foot (706-meter) Tolovana Hot Springs Dome and provides views of the White Mountains. There are two steep descents on the way in, and two steep climbs on the way out. The trail is accessible by foot, skis or snowshoes; temperatures can range from -20 °F to -40 °F. During the summer the trail can be very muddy. There are three trails, two of which are only accessible in winter, area also has a private air strip.

== Water profile ==
The water emerges from the spring at 140 °F (60 °C). The water contains sodium chloride and sulfur dioxide, with a pH of 7.4.

== See also ==
- List of hot springs in the United States
- Yukon-Koyukuk Census Area
