= Charley River =

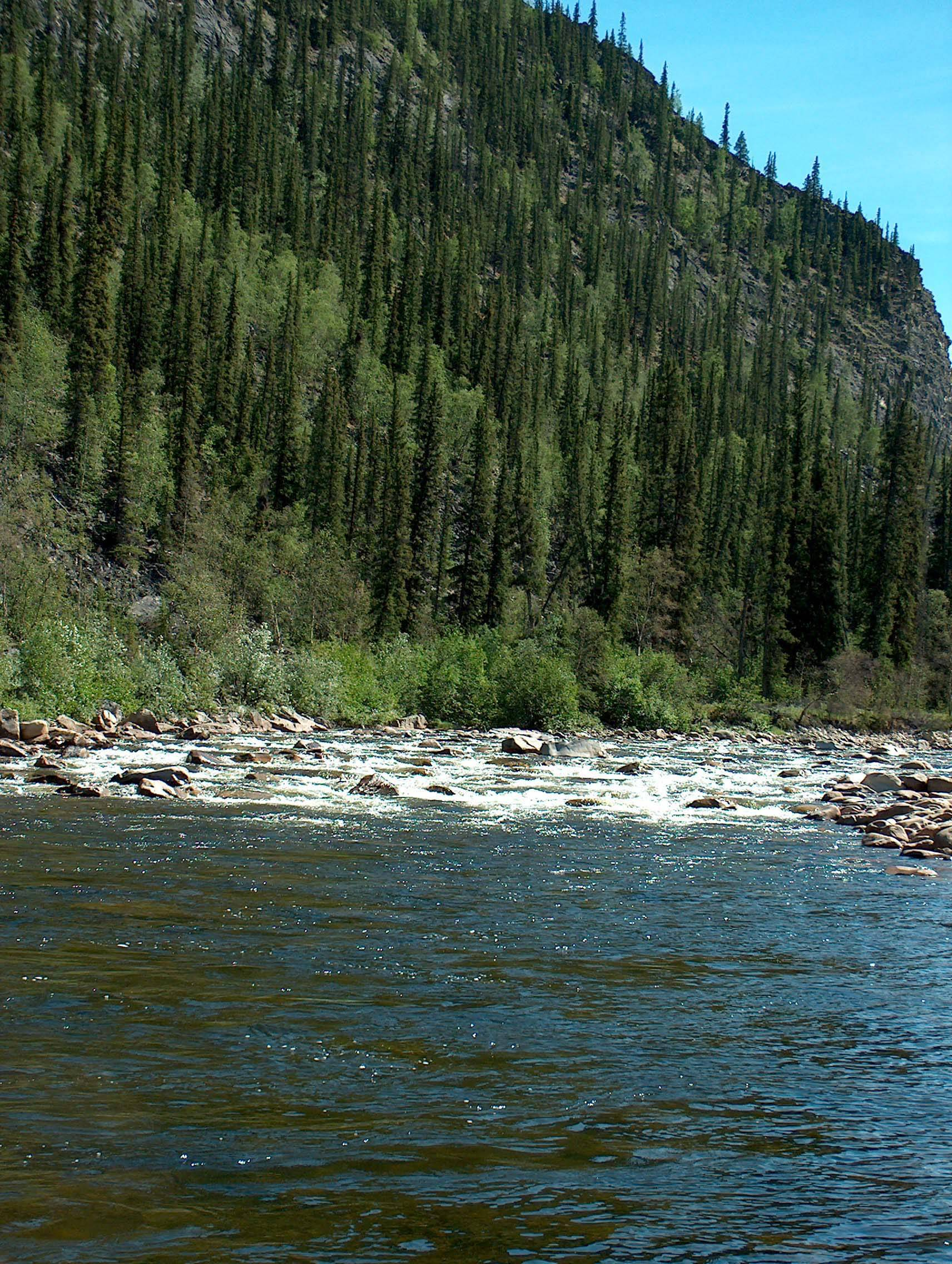
- Flowing through Yukon–Charley Rivers National Preserve

- Location of the mouth of the Charley River in Alaska

Location
- Country: United States
- State: Alaska
- Census Area: Southeast Fairbanks, Yukon–Koyukuk

Physical characteristics
- Source: Mertie Mountains
  - location: Yukon–Charley Rivers National Preserve, Southeast Fairbanks Census Area
  - coordinates: 64°42′15″N 144°02′41″W
  - elevation: 4,023 ft (1,226 m)
- Mouth: Yukon River
  - location: 55 miles (89 km) northwest of Eagle, Yukon–Koyukuk Census Area
  - coordinates: 65°19′02″N 142°46′50″W
  - elevation: 686 ft (209 m)
- Length: 88 mi (142 km)

National Wild and Scenic River
- Type: Wild 208.0 miles (334.7 km)
- Designated: December 2, 1980

The Charley River is an 88-mile (142 km) tributary of the Yukon River in the U.S. state of Alaska. Flowing generally northeast from the Mertie Mountains (named after geologist John Beaver Mertie, Jr.) in the northeastern part of the state, the river lies entirely within Yukon–Charley Rivers National Preserve. The Charley River enters the larger river downstream and 55 miles (89 km) northwest of Eagle.

In 1980, the Charley River and all of its main tributaries became part of the National Wild and Scenic Rivers System. A total of 208 miles (335 km) was declared "wild" along the entire main stem as well as Copper, Bonanza, Hosford, Derwent, Flat-Orthmer, Crescent, and Moraine creeks.

The Charley River watershed is forested chiefly with black spruce and white spruce. This general locus within the Yukon River catchment is the approximate westernmost limit of the black spruce, Picea mariana. The river forms part of the boundary between the Southeast Fairbanks and Yukon–Koyukuk census areas.

== Boating ==
The Charley River is generally floated by raft or inflatable canoe or kayak. The upper river is rated Class III (intermediate) on the International Scale of River Difficulty, rising to Class IV (advanced) in high water. The lower 76 miles (122 km) are rated Class II (novice) to III. Dangers include swift current, overhanging or submerged vegetation, rocks, rapids, and weather-related fluctuations in water levels.

== See also ==
- List of rivers of Alaska

== Works cited ==
- J.G. Clough et al. 1995. Geological Map of the Charley Basin, Alaska Department of Fish and Game
- C. Michael Hogan. 2008. Black Spruce: Picea mariana, GlobalTwitcher.com, ed. Nicklas Stromberg
