= Wickersham Dome (Yukon–Koyukuk Census Area) =

Summit in Alaska, United States

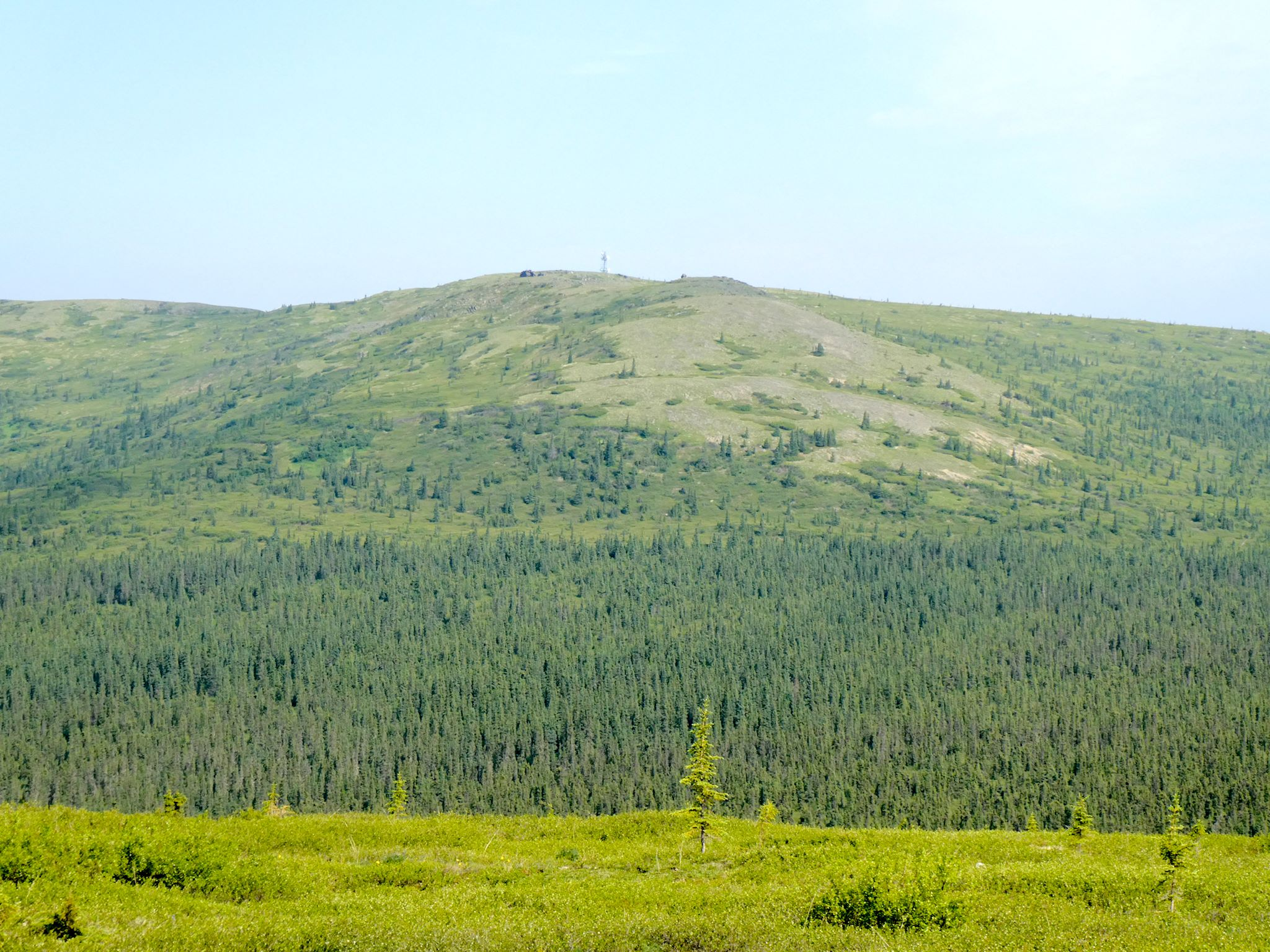
- Wickersham Dome, 2019

Highest point
- Elevation: 3,159 ft (963 m)
- Coordinates: 65°13′02″N 148°03′24″W

Naming
- Native name: Khoodeneldeł (Lower Tanana)

Geography
- Location within Alaska
- Country: United States
- State: Alaska
- Census area: Yukon–Koyukuk Census Area

Wickersham Dome (Lower Tanana: Khoodeneldeł) is a summit in the Yukon–Koyukuk Census Area, Alaska, located 27 miles (43 km) northwest of Fairbanks near the Elliott Highway. It is named after Wickersham Creek, which heads on the southeast slope of Wickersham Dome. The creek itself is named for James Wickersham.

It is a popular hiking destination in the White Mountains National Recreation Area.

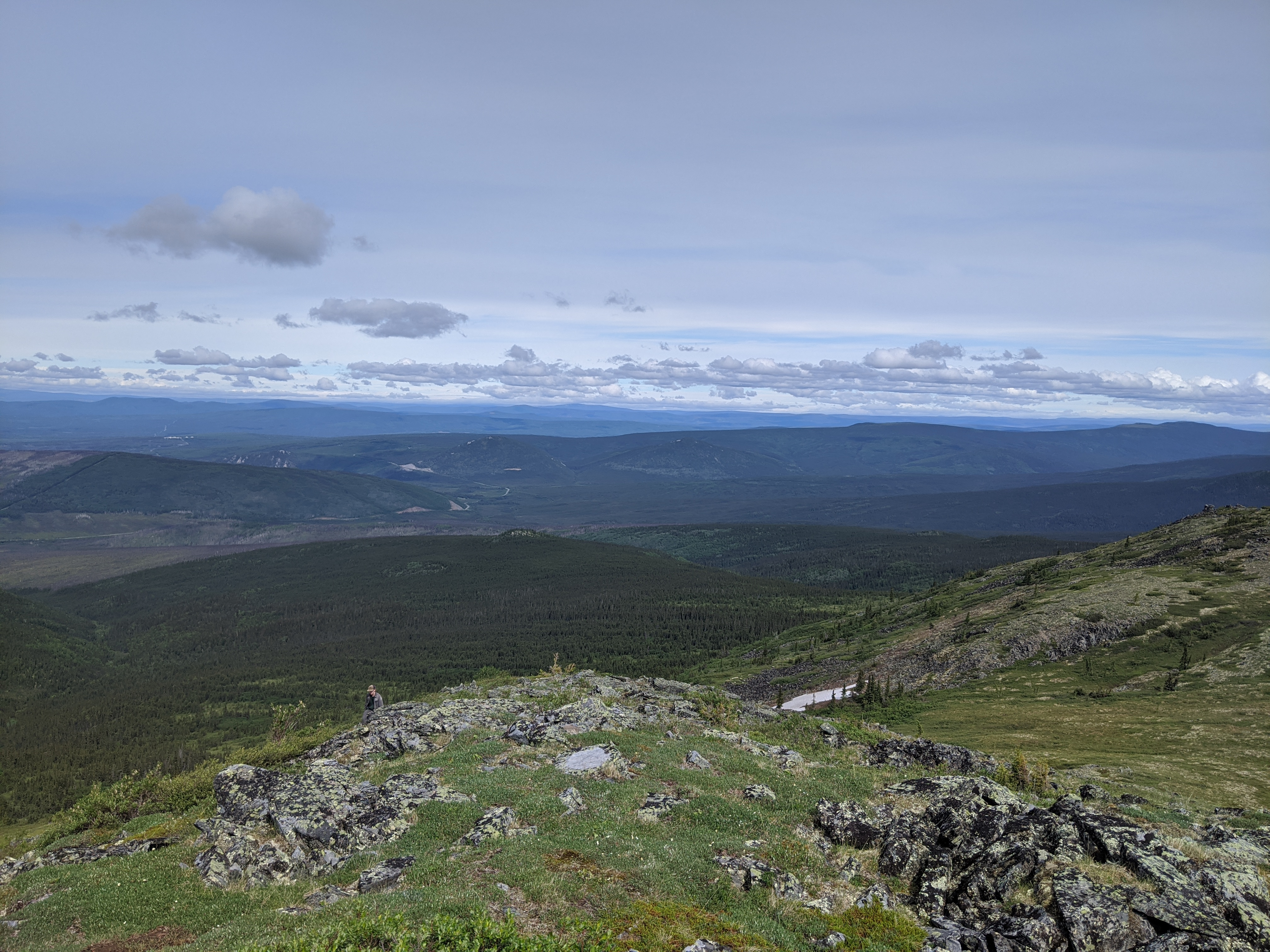
View from the summit of Wickersham Dome, 2020
