= Alaska National Interest Lands Conservation Act =

United States federal law providing protection to certain areas in Alaska

ANILCA

96th United States Congress
- Long title: An Act to provide for the designation and conservation of certain public lands in the State of Alaska, including the designation of units of the National Park, National Wildlife Refuge, National Forest, National Wild and Scenic Rivers, and National Wilderness Preservation Systems, and for other purposes.
- Citation: Pub. L. 96–487
- Passed by: 96th United States Congress
- Passed: November 12, 1980
- Signed by: Jimmy Carter
- Signed: December 2, 1980

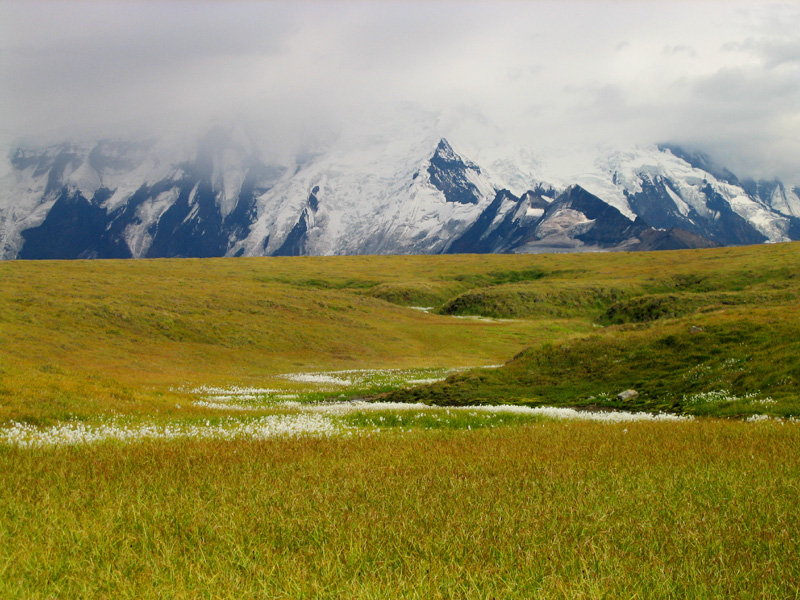
Wrangell–St. Elias National Park and Preserve

The Alaska National Interest Lands Conservation Act (ANILCA) is a United States federal law signed by President Jimmy Carter on December 2, 1980. ANILCA provided varying degrees of special protection to over 157 million acres (640,000 km^{2}) of land, including national parks, national wildlife refuges, national monuments, wild and scenic rivers, recreational areas, national forests, and conservation areas. It was, and remains to date, the single largest expansion of protected lands in history and more than doubled the size of the National Park System.

The Act provided for 43.585 million acres (176,380 km^{2}) of new national parklands in Alaska; the addition of 9.8 million acres (40,000 km^{2}) to the National Wildlife Refuge System; twenty-five wild and scenic rivers, with twelve more to be studied for that designation; establishment of Misty Fjords and Admiralty Island National Monuments in Southeast Alaska; establishment of Steese National Conservation Area and White Mountains National Recreation Area to be managed by the Bureau of Land Management; the addition of 9.1 million acres (37,000 km^{2}) to the Wilderness Preservation System, and the addition of 3.35 million acres (13,600 km^{2}) to Tongass and Chugach National Forests.

== Protected areas ==
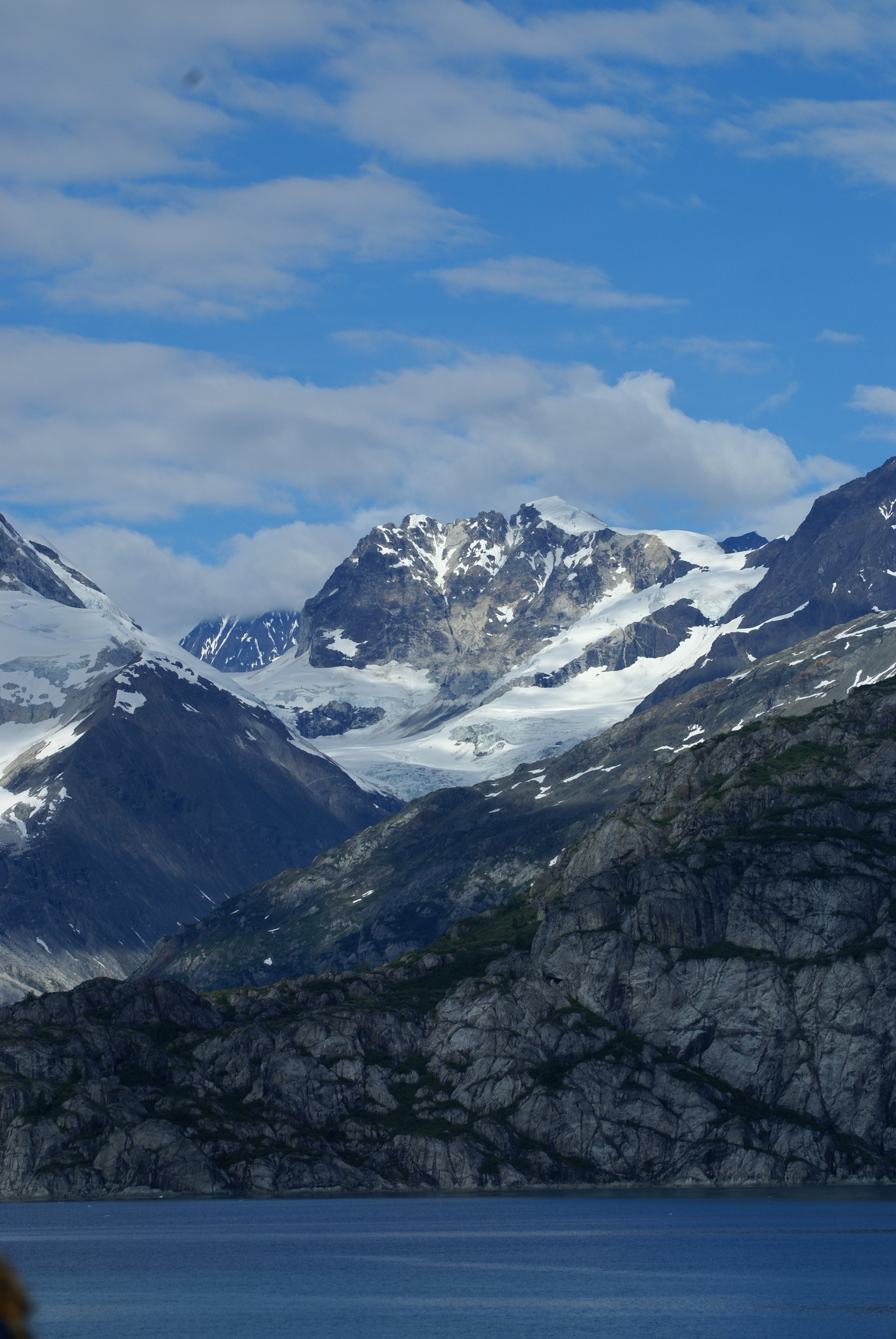
Glacier Bay National Park and Preserve

The act provided for the creation or expansion of several Conservation System Units (CSUs) including:

- significant changes to the Arctic National Wildlife Refuge
- Admiralty Island National Monument
- Aniakchak National Monument and Preserve
- Bering Land Bridge National Preserve
- Cape Krusenstern National Monument
- Denali National Park
- Gates Of The Arctic National Park and Preserve
- Glacier Bay National Park and Preserve
- Katmai National Park and Preserve
- Kenai Fjords National Park
- Kenai National Wildlife Refuge
- Kobuk Valley National Park
- Lake Clark National Park and Preserve
- Misty Fjords National Monument
- Noatak National Preserve
- Wrangell–St. Elias National Park and Preserve
- Yukon-Charley Rivers National Preserve
- Yukon Delta National Wildlife Refuge
- Yukon Flats National Wildlife Refuge

== Alaska Native Claims Settlement Act ==
In 1971, the Alaska Native Claims Settlement Act (ANCSA) was signed into law to resolve the long-standing issues surrounding aboriginal land claims in Alaska, as well as to stimulate economic development throughout Alaska. Section 17(d)(1) gave the Secretary of the Interior 90 days to withdraw from development any lands necessary "to insure that the public interest in these lands is properly protected." Additionally, Section 17(d)(2) directed the Secretary of the Interior to withdraw up to 80 million acres of land from development for conservation purposes. These lands, referred to as "d-2" lands, were to be available for potential congressional designation as National Parks, Wildlife Refuges, Wild and Scenic rivers, or National Forests. The "d-2" provision of ANCSA gave the Secretary nine months to withdraw lands before they would re-open to development. On December 17, 1972, Interior Secretary Rogers Morton forwarded 127.1 million acres (514,000 km^{2}) of selected lands to Congress under 17(d)(1) and 17(d)(2), known as the "Morton Proposal." These lands were withdrawn from all forms of public appropriation under the public land laws pending action from Congress, setting the stage for the eventual passage of ANILCA.

== Sunset provisions ==
As stated, the "d-2" provision of ANCSA set a deadline for the Secretary to withdraw lands within nine months of the passage of ANCSA. In addition, ANCSA also set a deadline for Congress to act on the Secretary's withdrawal within five years of the passage of ANCSA; if the Secretary did not act to withdraw lands earmarked for special protections within nine months of the passage of ANCSA, or Congress did not act to implement the Secretary's selection within five years of the passage of ANCSA, the lands would be reopened to development.

== Early Legislation ==
On January 29, 1973, Congressman James A. Haley (D-Florida) introduced the Morton proposal as H.R. 12336, and the next day Senator Henry M. Jackson (D-Washington) introduced the Senate version of the bill. These bills were the first of many failed proposals leading to the eventual passage of ANILCA seven years later. Over the course of the seven years many bills were introduced with a wide range of proposals for disposal of the selected lands.

As the sunset date approached in 1978 both chambers of Congress scrambled to pass a bill. On May 19, 1978, H.R. 39 was passed by the House of Representatives. H.R. 39 was referred to the Senate Committee on Energy and Natural Resources for mark up and combined with a number of other bills pertaining to Alaska lands. Senator Ted Stevens (R-Alaska) was instrumental in making significant changes to the original House resolution. The final bill submitted by the Senate energy committee was deemed unacceptable by the Carter administration and supporters of H.R. 39 in the House. With limited time left before adjournment, the House and Senate conferenced in order to resolve differences between the two bills. Senator Mike Gravel (D-Alaska) inserted himself into the negotiations, making a number of new demands not included in either bill. Changes made to the bill did not satisfy Gravel, and he refused to support the bill. With adjournment fast approaching, a provision to extend the (d)(2) protections for one more year to allow for additional time to pass a bill was passed in the House, and introduced in the Senate on October 16, 1978. Gravel threatened a filibuster, and the provision did not pass the Senate. The sunset provision of section (d)(2) of ANCSA was set to expire on December 18, 1978.

== Use of the Antiquities Act ==
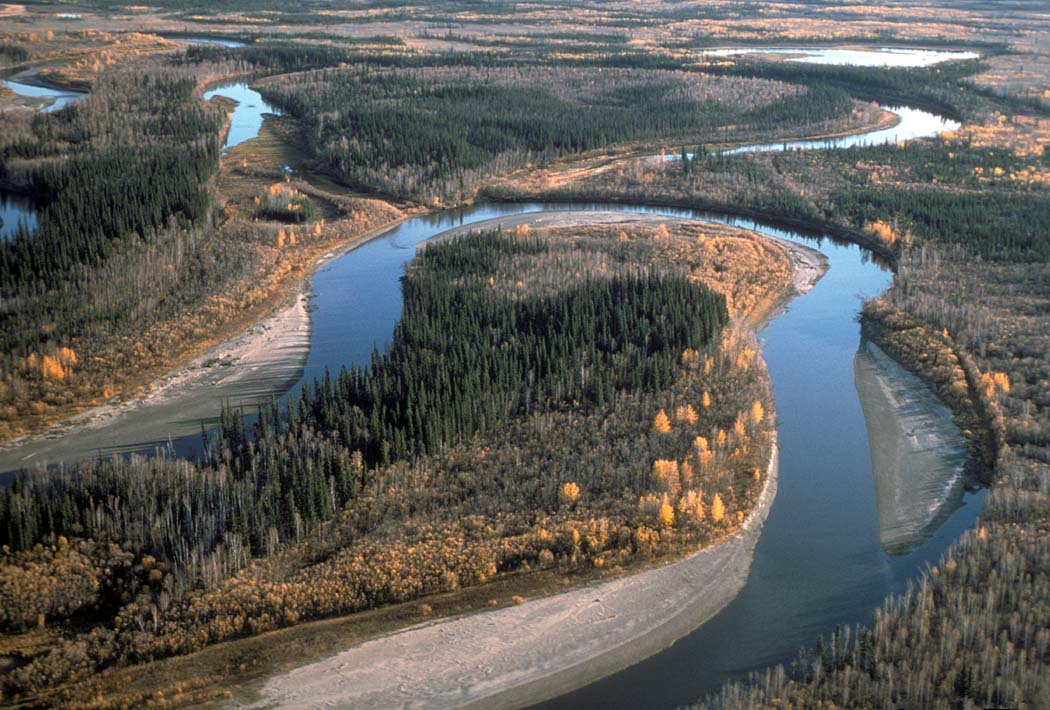
Yukon Flats National Wildlife Refuge

The Interior Department and the National Park Service became concerned as 1978 dragged on that no action would be taken on the "national interest lands" included in the Morton Proposal, and as early as July 1978 the Park Service had taken the first steps to secure additional protection when it began to draft national monument proclamations for proposed NPS areas.

President Carter used the Antiquities Act to designate 56 million acres (230,000 km^{2}) as 17 National Monuments by executive order on December 1, 1978. Much of the lands designated as National Monument were part of the original Morton Proposal. An additional 40 million acres (160,000 km^{2}) were withdrawn under the authority of section 204(c) of the Federal Land Policy and Management Act by Interior Secretary Cecil Andrus.

Carter stated that he had been forced to use the Antiquities Act by Congress's failure to act in a reasonable time, but his actions nevertheless caused wide protest across Alaska. President Carter was burned in effigy in Fairbanks. Residents in the Cantwell area undertook a large act of civil disobedience known as the Great Denali Trespass – they went into the park, fired off guns, made campfires, and conducted various other activities prohibited under Federal regulations. The towns of Eagle and Glennallen, both in the shadow of new monuments, produced official proclamations stating that the towns would not support NPS authorities, not enforce NPS regulations, and would shelter individuals who broke the regulations.

Though these protests continued for some time, the designation of the monuments broke the legislative opposition to ANILCA. Some in Congress, and various oil and gas industry, and other development interest, continued to oppose passage of the bill, but in the wake of Carter's proclamations most opponents recognized the need to work toward passage of an acceptable bill, rather than no bill at all. However, in 1978, 75 seats in the House had changed hands, producing a much more conservative body than the one that had supported Carter's use of the Antiquities Act. Proponents were forced to continue to work compromises, and the bill's passage was further delayed.

== Final passage ==
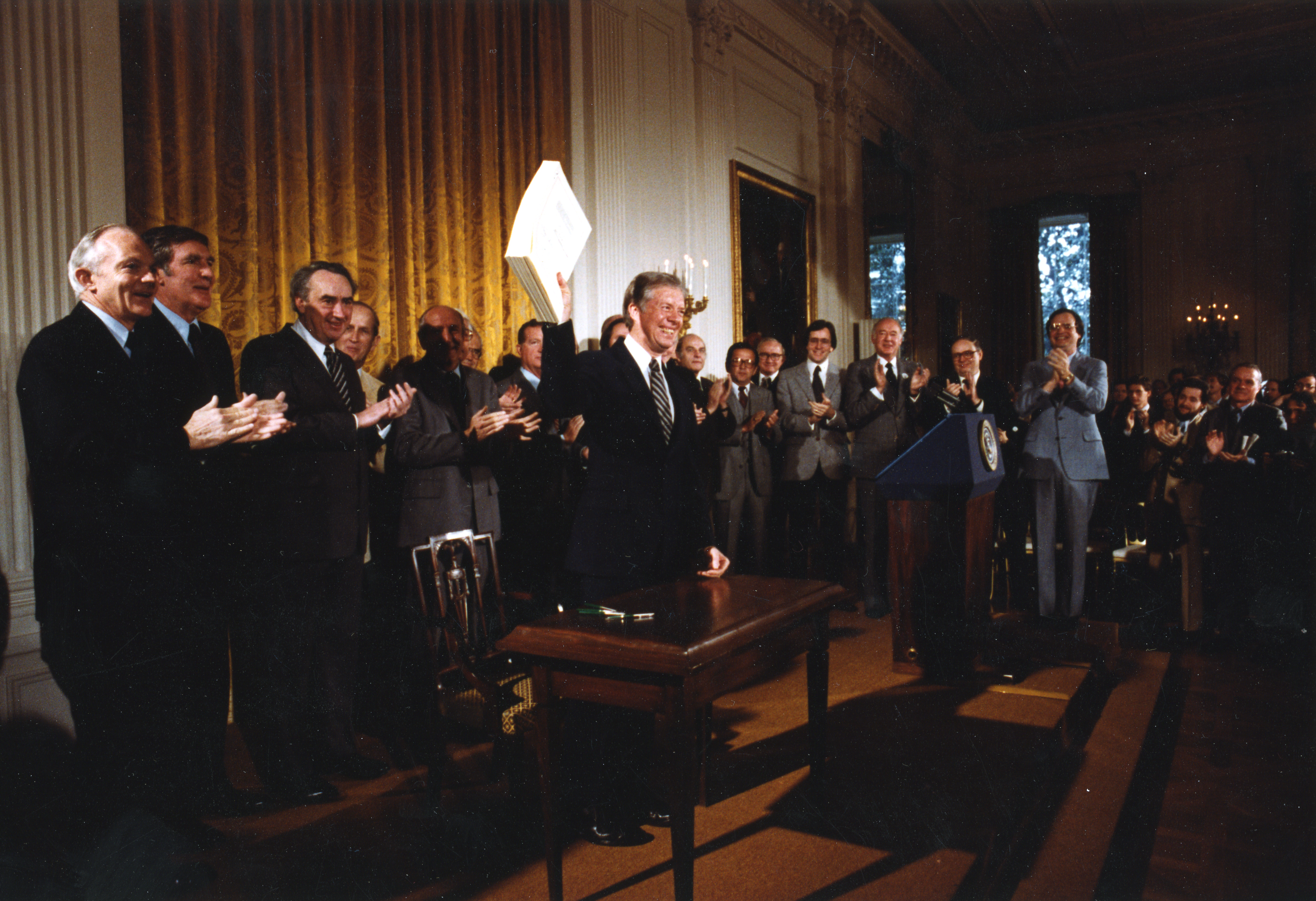
President Jimmy Carter after signing the Alaska National Interest Lands Conservation Act on December 2, 1980

In early November 1980, Jimmy Carter lost re-election to Ronald Reagan, and the Republican Party won a majority of seats in the Senate. Conservationists and other proponents of the legislation recognized that if they did not accept the compromise then on the table, they would be forced to begin again in the next Congress with decidedly less support. The bill was passed in late November, and signed into law by President Carter in December.

== Selected provisions ==
- Lands claimed by Alaska Natives under ANCSA are officially recognized.
- Native land claims pending as of December 18, 1971, are officially approved.
- Existing timber contracts are to be filled with timber from other national forest lands.
- If private land is surrounded by conservation system units "adequate and feasible" access must be guaranteed.

== Ramifications ==
Senator Gravel, meanwhile, took considerable blame in Alaska for forcing Carter's hand with the Antiquities Act. Though Carter was hardly held blameless for the creation of the new national monuments, Gravel was taken to task for the unpopular decision as well and was denied his party's nomination for his Senate seat in the 1980 election.

With the passage of time, however, and now, several decades later, support for the vision of ANILCA has increased, even among former detractors in Alaska – as the spectacular parks, monuments, refuges and other areas set aside by the 1980 legislation have become a significant boon to Alaska tourism and the State's economy. A telephone poll in 2000 showed that 45 percent of Alaskans supported the protection of the ANILCA-designated 1002 coastal plain area of the Arctic National Wildlife Refuge, the most controversial aspect of ANILCA's protected areas, while 49 percent opposed the protection.

The final bill accelerated logging in the Tongass National Forest, the nation's largest, by giving the US Forest Service a yearly $40,000,000 appropriation to cut timber, not subject to the appropriation laws but derived from the taxes on oil etc, and by providing that 450 million board feet of trees would be clearcut each year. This was the price conservationists paid in the compromise.

=== Impact on Alaska Natives ===
Under Title VIII, Subsistence Management And Use, not just Alaska Natives qualified but also rural residents were granted hunting and fishing rights when fish and game are not under outside threat. In addition the bill expedited the enactment of the 1971 Alaska Native Claims Settlement Act.
