= Yukon–Charley Rivers National Preserve =

United States national preserve in Alaska

Yukon-Charley Rivers National Preserve
- IUCN category V (protected landscape/seascape)
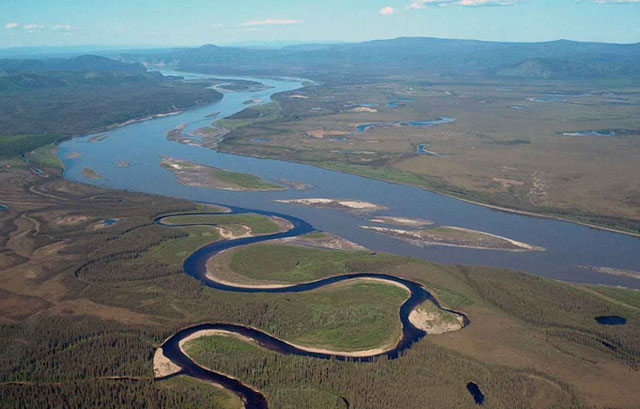
- The Charley River where it joins the larger Yukon

- Location within Alaska
- Interactive map of Yukon-Charley Rivers National Preserve
- Location: Southeast Fairbanks Census Area and Yukon-Koyukuk Census Area, Alaska, USA
- Nearest city: Fairbanks, Alaska
- Coordinates: 65°00′N 143°30′W
- Area: 2,525,512 acres (10,220.38 km^{2})
- Created: December 1, 1978
- Visitors: 962 (in 2025)
- Governing body: National Park Service
- Website: Yukon–Charley Rivers National Preserve

Yukon–Charley Rivers National Preserve is a United States national preserve located in east central Alaska along the border with Canada. Managed by the National Park Service, the preserve encompasses 130 miles (208 km) of the 1,800-mile (3,000 km) Yukon River and the entire Charley River basin. The preserve protects the undeveloped Charley River and a significant portion of the upper Yukon. The interior Alaskan region experiences extremes of weather, with temperatures that can vary from −50 °F (−46 °C) in winter to 97 °F (36 °C) in summertime. The Yukon provided a means of access to the region, which is entirely roadless, during the late 19th century and early 20th centuries. Gold rushes in Alaska brought prospectors, who operated gold dredges to recover significant quantities of placer gold from area creeks. Today the preserve includes part of the route of the annual Yukon Quest dogsled race, which runs every February. During the summer float trips are popular on the Yukon and Charley Rivers.

== Geography ==
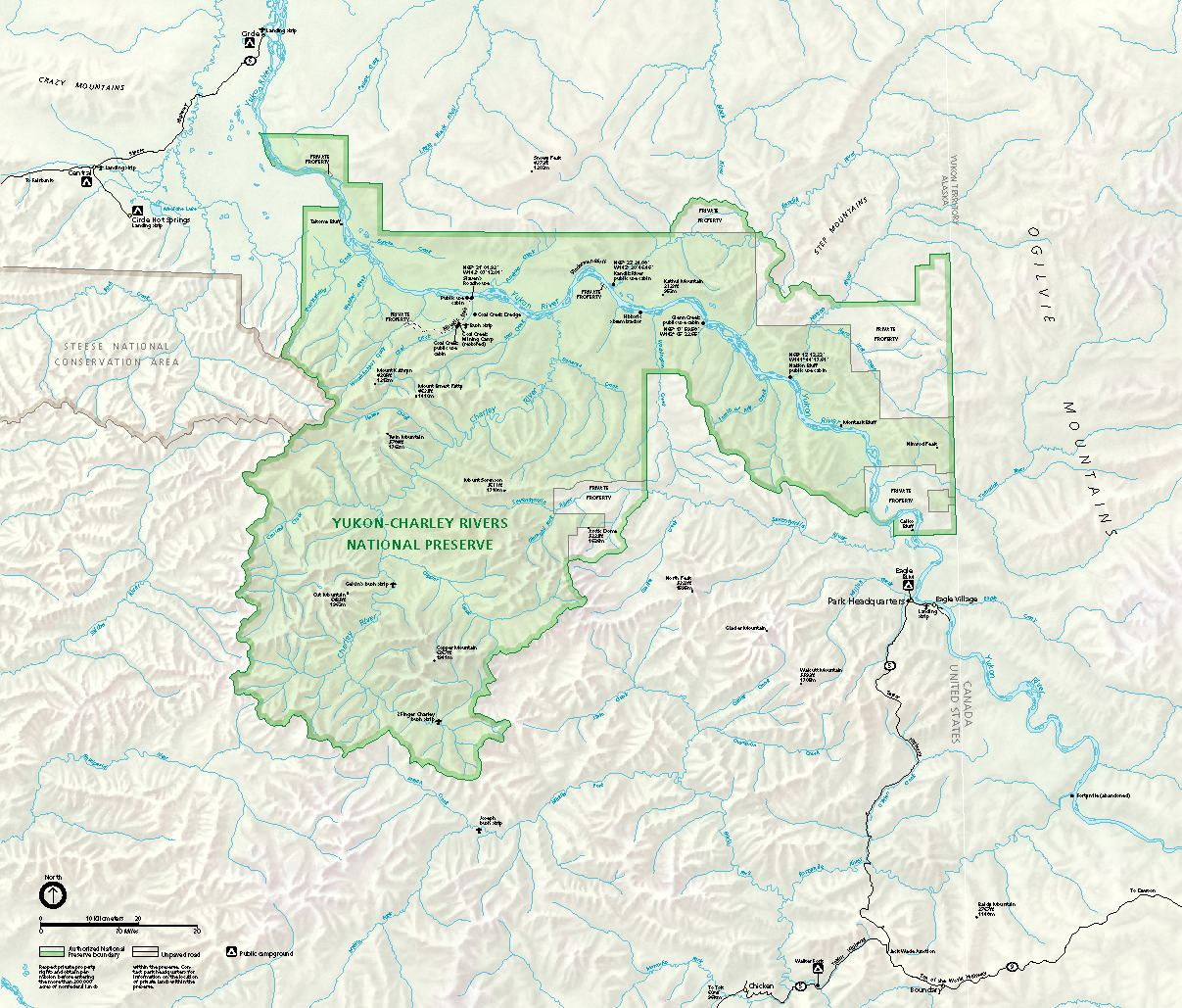
Map of Yukon–Charley Rivers National Preserve Also see resolution adjustable pdf map

No roads access Yukon–Charley Rivers National Preserve. The closest approaches by road are to the village of Eagle, upstream on the Yukon to the southeast of the preserve, on the Taylor Highway, and via the Steese Highway to Circle, downstream on the Yukon to the northwest of the preserve. Access from those points to the preserve is usually by air taxi or boat.

The northern part of the preserve includes a portion of the Yukon River valley, which runs from east to west after entering Alaska from Canada near Eagle. The southern portion of the preserve includes the entire drainage of the Charley River, one of the Yukon's tributaries. The preserve adjoins Steese National Conservation Area to the west. The Charley River is designated a National Wild and Scenic River, largely undisturbed by people. The preserve and the Yukon valley lie between the Brooks Range to the north and the Alaska Range to the south. The highest elevations in the preserve are about 6,000 feet (1,800 m) in the headwaters of the Charley River, ranging to about 600 feet (180 m) where the Yukon leaves the preserve.

=== Geology ===
The Yukon River is the main feature of the preserve, one of the largest rivers in North America. The Yukon's valley is bordered by bluffs and terraces along its course, representing river downcutting through alluvial deposits. The lowlands were never glaciated during the last ice age, but higher valleys did see glaciation, in which the ice-free land was mostly tundra. As the climate warmed, forests advanced from the south.

== Ecology ==
The preserve's climate is subarctic at lower elevations, typically up to the timberline at 3,000 feet (910 m) to 3,500 feet (1,100 m), and arctic at higher elevations. Winters extend from October to March, with temperatures that occasionally reach −50 °F (−46 °C). Days are short, with about six hours of light. Summertime highs range between 65 °F (18 °C) and 75 °F (24 °C) and exceptional high temperatures of 97 °F (36 °C) have been recorded. Summer nights in June and early July do not get fully dark, owing to the preserve's location close to the Arctic Circle. The majority of the preserve is taiga, or boreal forest, primarily black spruce, white spruce, with alder, willow, birch, cottonwood and poplar. The preserve environment is a fire-dependent ecosystem, with a mosaic of burned and unburned lands. Hot summer temperatures and dry weather allow lightning strikes to start fires which maintain a diverse ecosystem.

The Yukon is host to significant quantities of economically important fish. The chief salmon species in the portion of the Yukon that runs in the preserve are chinook, coho and chum. Large mammals in the preserve include wolf, black bear, moose, caribou, and Dall's sheep. Other fish include Arctic grayling, northern pike, sheefish, burbot and whitefish. The best fishing is found along tributaries of the Yukon or near their mouths, where the brown, muddy water of the Yukon is more clear.

== Activities ==
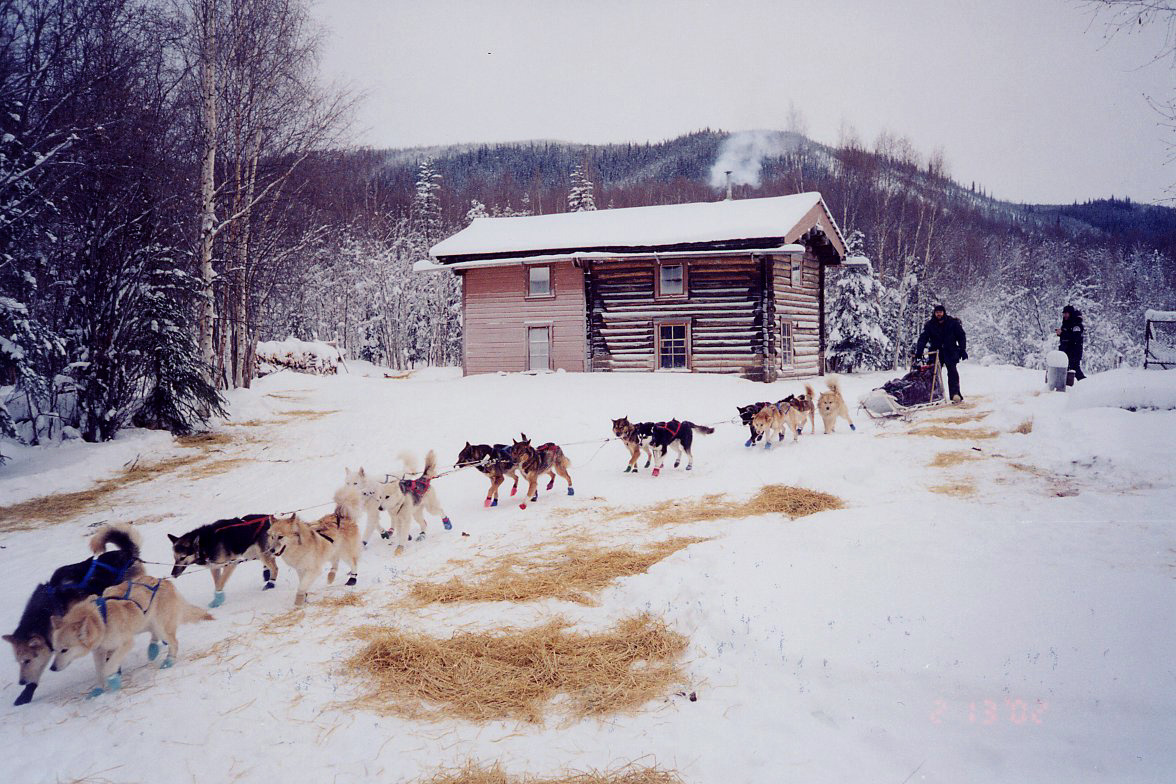
Dogsled team leaving Slaven's Roadhouse during the Yukon Quest race

As a consequence of Yukon-Charley Rivers' designation as a national preserve, both subsistence hunting by local residents and sport hunting are allowed within the preserve, subject to Alaskan game regulations. Camping is permitted on any publicly owned lands within the preserve.

The Charley River can be floated from June through August. The majority of the river is rated at Class II, with some Class III and even Class IV during high water. Most of the rapids occur in the area of the bluffs where the river emerges into the main Yukon valley. The Yukon River can be floated from May to September. The most popular trip is from Eagle to Circle, a 158-mile (254 km) trip, averaging 30 miles (48 km) per day.

== History ==
Archaeological investigations in the Yukon valley have not been well-documented. Evidence from other portions of northern Alaska indicates that people lived in the area as early as 11,000 years before the present. Northern Athabaskan speakers moved into the region by about 1500 BP. One theory proposes that the eruption of the White River Ash about 1900 years ago from Mount Churchill in the Saint Elias Mountains displaced people from the region of Kluane Lake into the relatively ash-free Yukon valley.

The inhabitants of the upper Yukon valley just prior to historic times were the Hän people, descendants of the Athabaskan migrants. In 1886 gold was discovered on the Fortymile River, drawing prospectors to the Yukon. The influx of newcomers caused the Hän to resettle in towns, in many cases working for miners. Circle City was established in 1893, Seventymile in 1888 and Mission Creek, now Eagle in 1895, all as mining camps. A number of sites in the preserve were developed for mining during this period. The boom died down by 1902, but two large dredge operations continued at Coal Creek and Woodchopper Creek, with smaller claims at scattered sites.

Geologist John Beaver Mertie Jr. mapped much of the region in the early 1900s. On January 9, 1986, the United States Board of Geographic Names approved naming an Alaskan mountain range after Mertie. The Mertie Mountains are located in the Yukon–Charley Rivers National Preserve, between Fairbanks and Eagle. The range is approximately 187 km (117 miles) long and 176 km (110 miles) wide.

=== Mining remnants ===
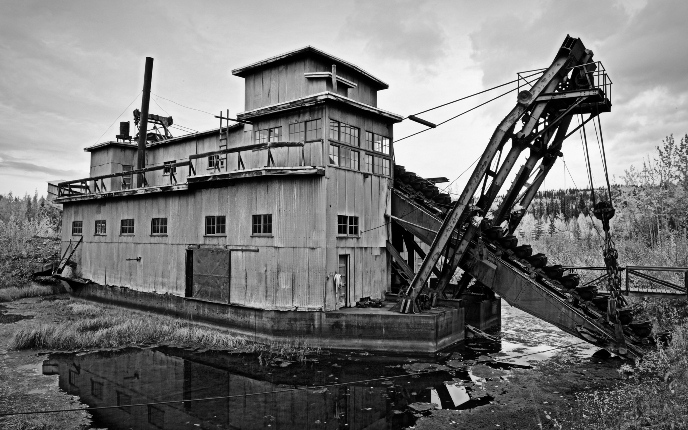
The Coal Creek gold dredge

Numerous rustic cabins and historic sites are located in the preserve. One of the most significant sites is Slaven's Roadhouse, at Coal Creek, built by prospector Frank Slaven in 1932. Slaven lived there until 1938, after which Gold Placers, Inc. used the cabin as a bunkhouse and supply drop for their gold dredging operations on Coal Creek. The cabin continues to be used as a dog drop station during the Yukon Quest dogsled races each February. In the summer the cabin serves as a bunkhouse for visitors and Park Service personnel. The roadhouse is a contributing feature in the Coal Creek Historic Mining District, which encompasses a number of structures associated with coal dredge mining on Coal Creek. The district's centerpiece is the Coal Creek dredge, floating in the creek. The dredge was built in Oakland, California in 1935 and shipped to the site, operating from 1936 until 1977, having recovered $3,229,124.61 worth of gold. Biederman's Cabin is located nearby, where mail carrier Ed Biederman boarded dogs for miners and trappers during the summer, using two fish wheels to catch enough salmon to feed the dogs.

=== Administration and designations ===
Yukon-Charley Rivers National Monument was proclaimed on December 1, 1978, by President Jimmy Carter using his authority under the Antiquities Act. Carter took the action after the Alaska National Interest Lands Conservation Act (ANILCA) was held up in Congress. In 1980 ANILCA was passed, and was signed into law by Carter on December 2, 1980, converting the monument into a national preserve. The preserve's headquarters are in Fairbanks with a field office in Eagle. On January 9, 1986, the United States Board of Geographic Names approved naming an Alaskan mountain range after geologist John Beaver Mertie Jr. The Mertie Mountains are located in the Yukon–Charley Rivers National Preserve, between Fairbanks and Eagle. The range is approximately 187 km (117 miles) long and 176 km (110 miles) wide.
