= White Mountains National Recreation Area =

National recreation area in Alaska, US

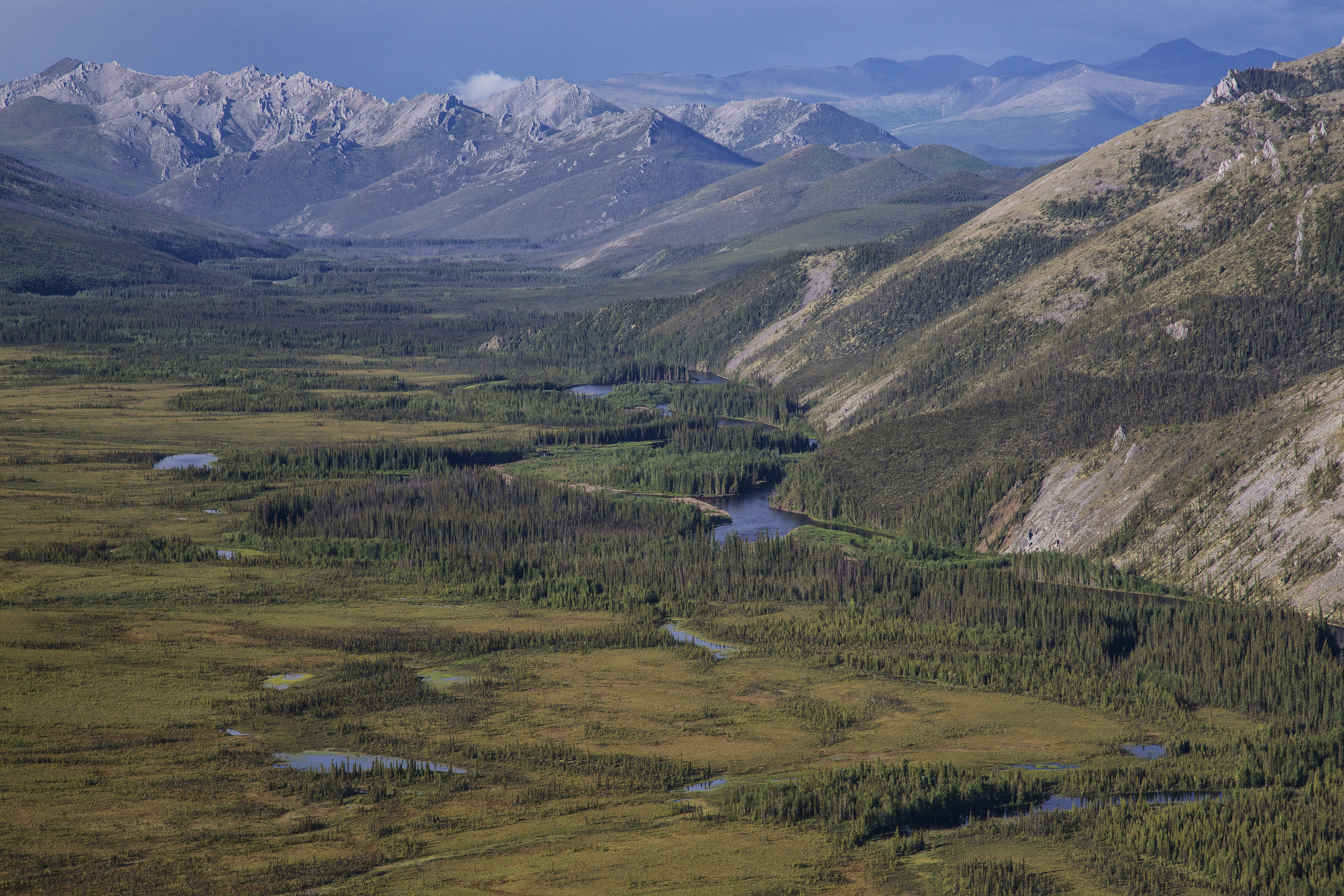

- Location within Alaska
- Location: Yukon-Koyukuk Borough Alaska, United States
- Nearest city: Fairbanks, Alaska
- Coordinates: 65.4°N 147.81667°W
- Area: 1,000,000 acres (4,000 km^{2})
- Governing body: Bureau of Land Management
- Website: White Mountains National Recreation Area

White Mountains National Recreation Area is a national recreation area in the U.S. state of Alaska. It is located to the north of Fairbanks between the Elliott Highway and the Steese Highway in the White Mountains, with about 1,000,000 acres (400,000 ha) within its boundaries. It is managed by the U.S. Bureau of Land Management as part of the National Landscape Conservation System. It is adjacent to Steese National Conservation Area. Beaver Creek flows through the area and is listed as a wild and scenic river.

== See also ==
- Wickersham Dome
