= Chena Hot Springs, Alaska =

Populated place in Alaska, United States

- Populated Place
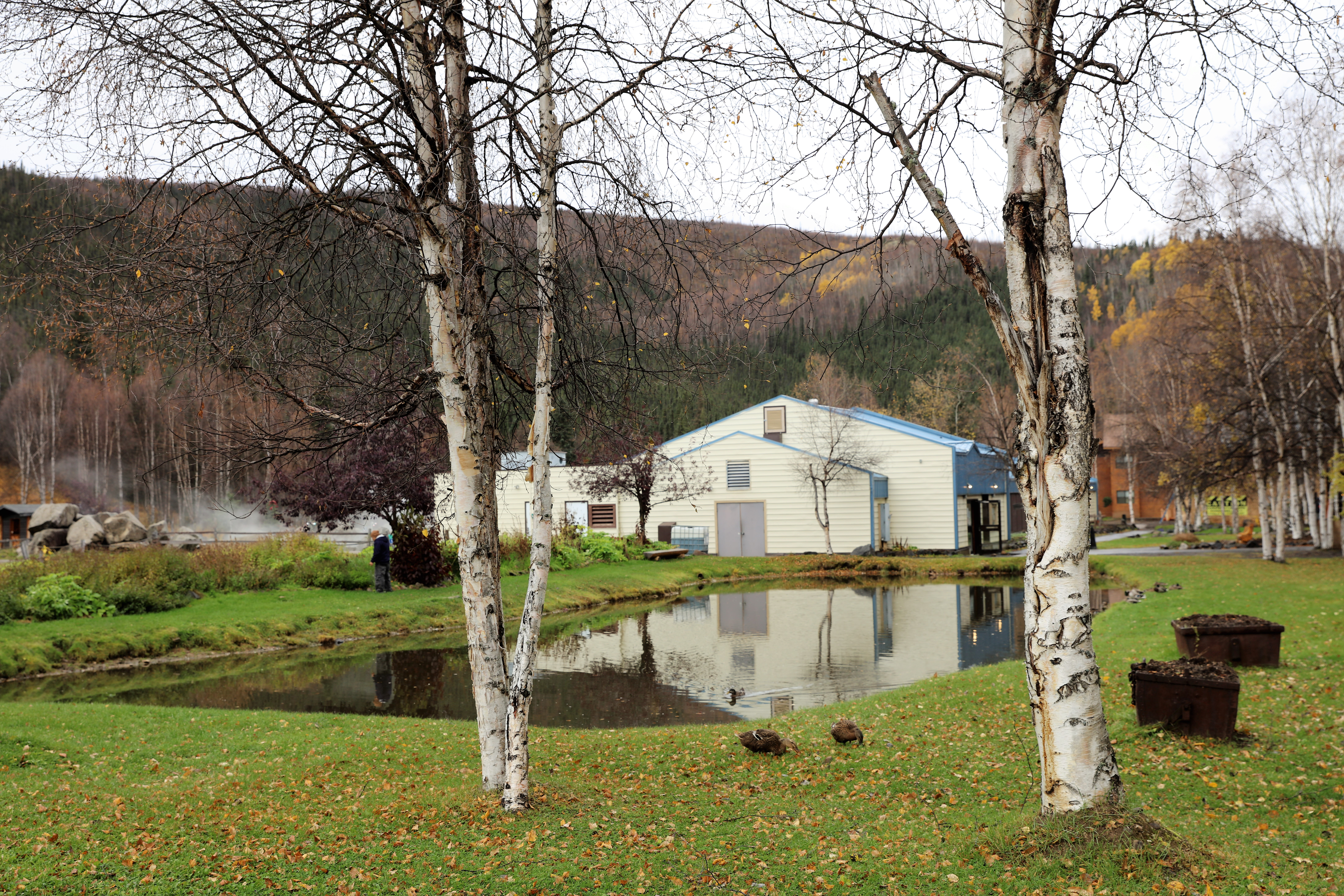
- Chena Hot Springs, Alaska, 2016

- Location in the U.S. state of Alaska
- Coordinates (USGS GNIS 1400199): 65°03′11″N 146°03′20″W
- Country: United States
- State: Alaska
- Borough: Fairbanks North Star
- Elevation: 1,158 ft (353 m)
- Time zone: UTC-9 (Alaska (AKST))
  - Summer (DST): UTC-8 (AKDT)
- ZIP code: 99712
- Area code: 907
- GNIS feature ID: 1400199

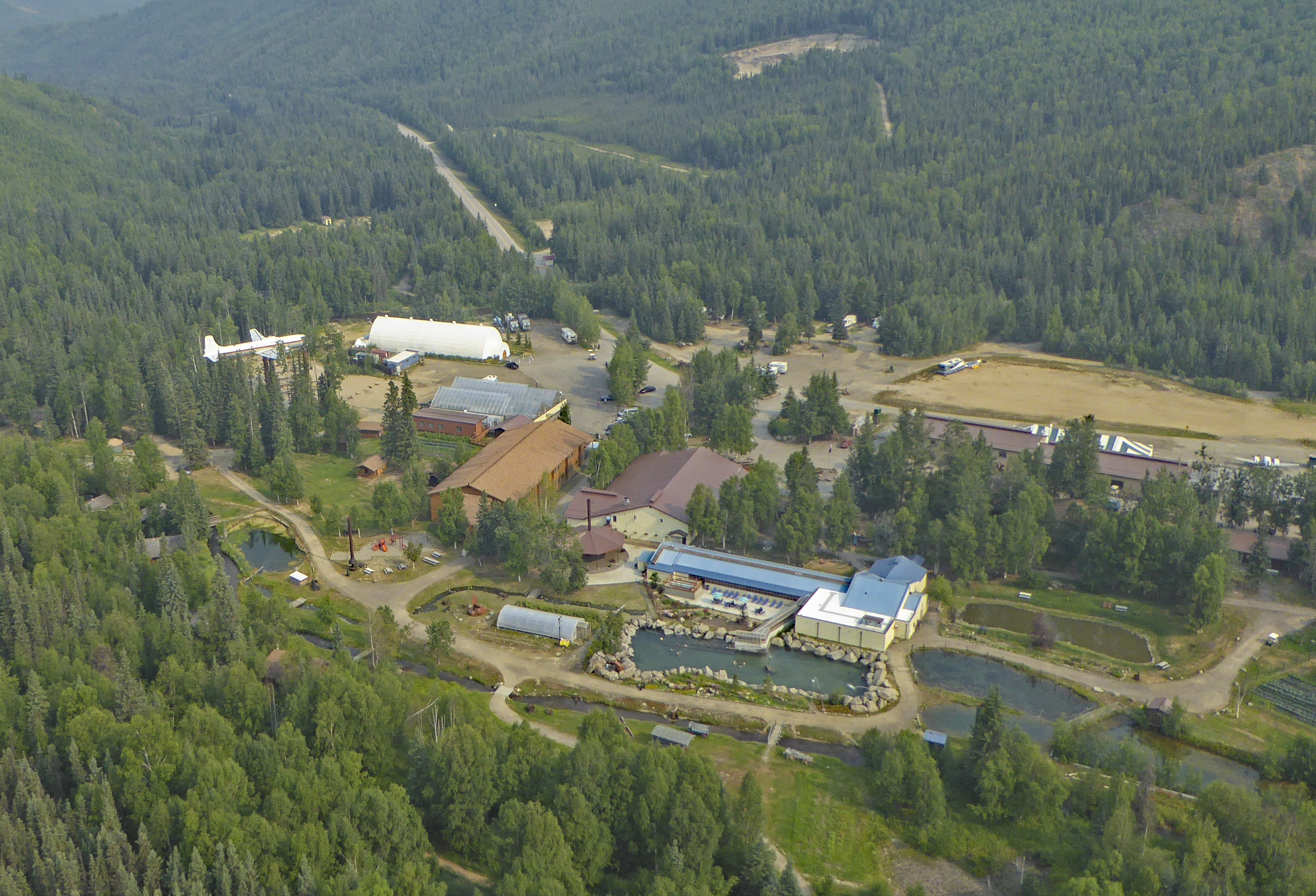
Aerial View of Chena Hot Springs

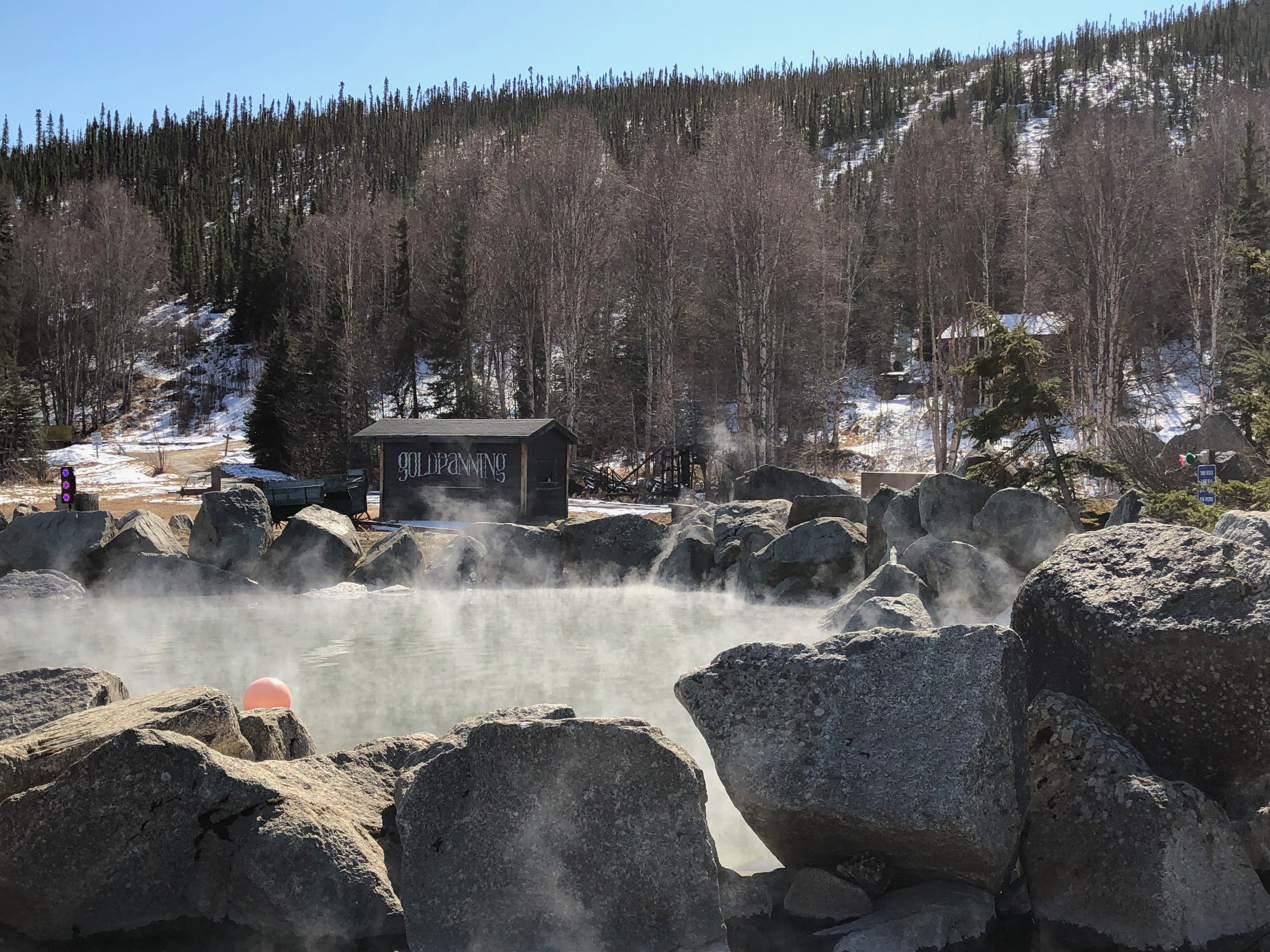
Chena Hot Springs Rock Lake Pool

Chena Hot Springs is an unincorporated community and hot spring resort in the Fairbanks North Star Borough, Alaska, United States, 56.5 miles (90.9 km) northeast of Fairbanks near the Chena River State Recreation Area. The resort makes use of the first low-temperature binary geothermal power plant built in Alaska, and is working on several alternative energy projects, including production and use of hydrogen and vegetable oil for fuel. The resort is conducting collaborative experiments in greenhouse production of vegetables with the University of Alaska Fairbanks Agricultural and Forestry Experiment Station.

== History ==
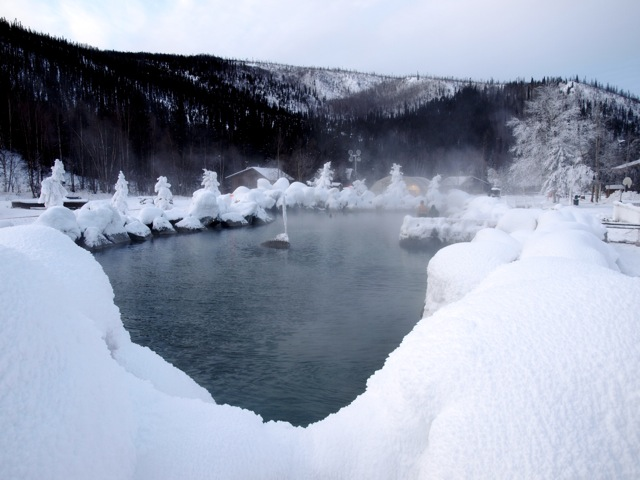
Chena Hot Springs

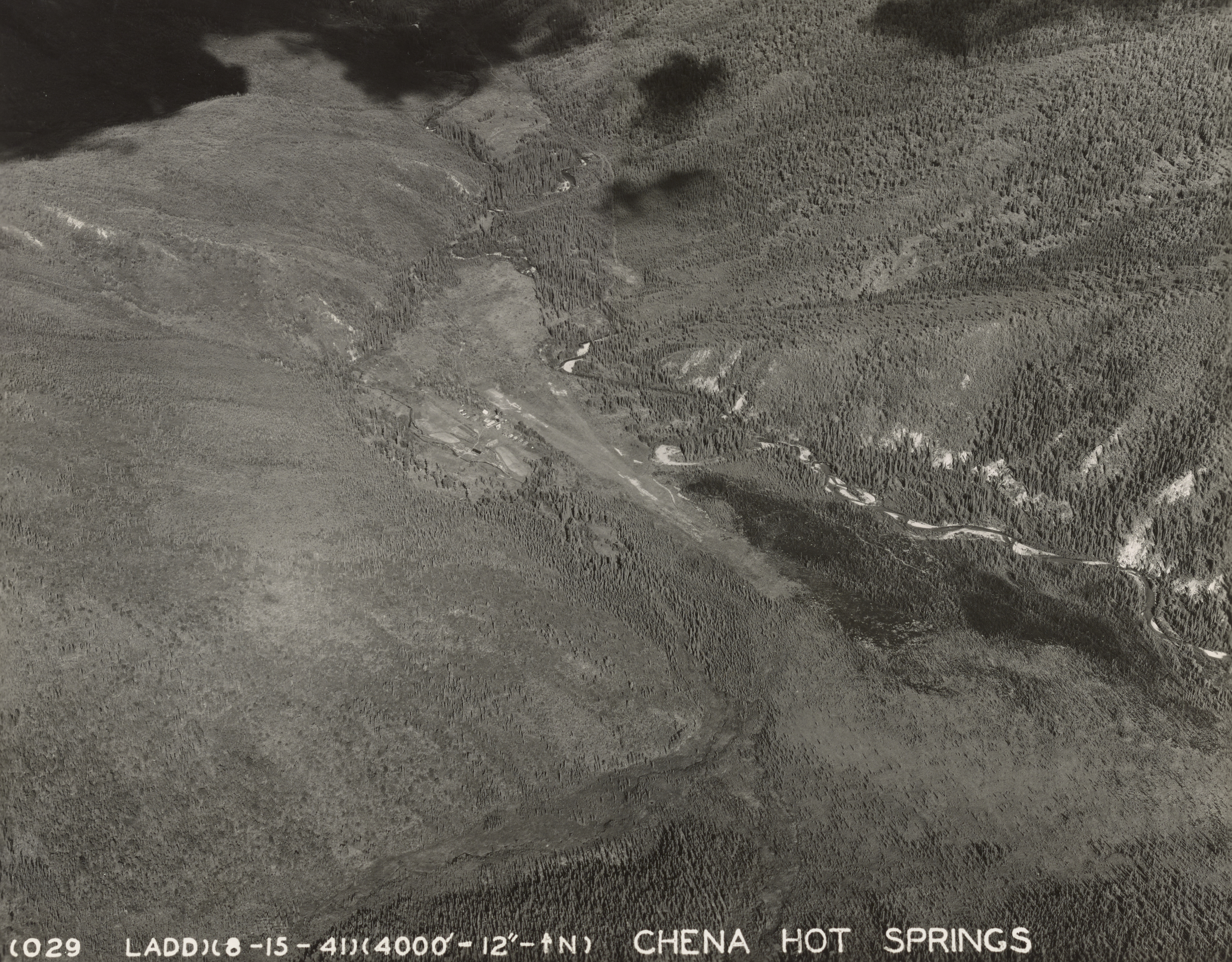
Chena Hot Springs Landing Field in 1942

Chena Hot Springs was founded over 100 years ago by two gold mining brothers, Robert and Thomas Swan. In 1905, Robert Swan was suffering from rheumatism and needed a place to calm his pain and be comfortable. The two brothers set out to find the hot springs. It took them a little over a month to reach the hot springs after searching for it in Interior Alaska’s harsh landscape. In 1911, twelve small cabins were built to accommodate visitors. The twelve cabins developed, establishing it as a resort in the interior of Alaska. The United States Department of Agriculture sent chemists to analyze the water.

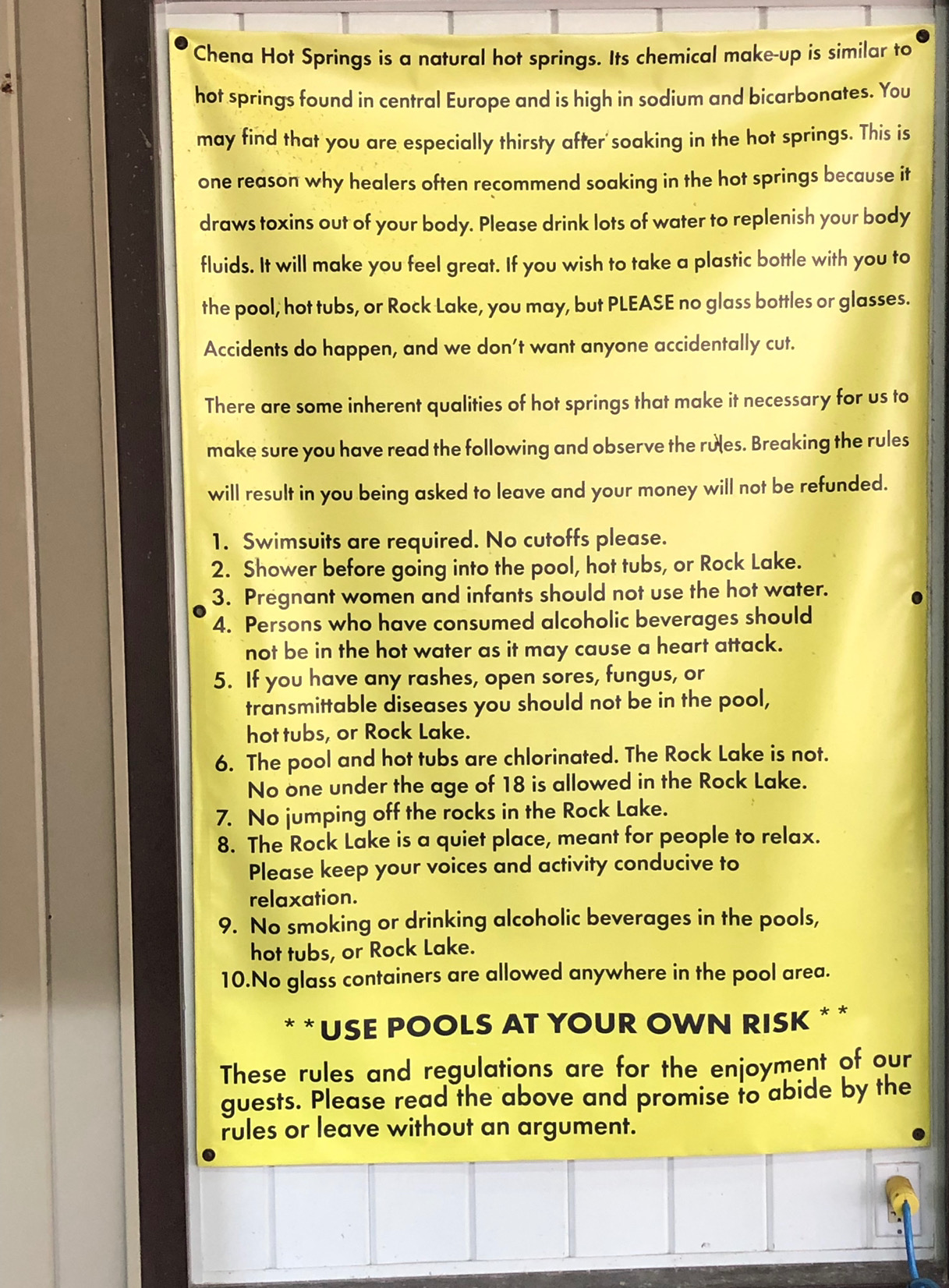
Warning sign at Chena Hot Springs explaining that water is high in sodium and bicarbonates

== Demographics ==
Chena Hot Springs has never formally reported a population on the U.S. Census. The USGS reported it had an estimated summer population of 10 for the resort.

== Weather ==
The coordinates for Chena Hot Springs Alaska are 65'03 N and 146'03 W (65.05, -146.05). The average yearly temperature for the area is −4.9 °C (23.2 °F), with the highest temperature being in July at 20.4 °C (68.7 °F) and the lowest temperature being in January at −31.2 °C (−24.2 °F). Annually the average amount of precipitation is 357 millimetres (14.1 in). The average snowfall amount in Chena Hot Springs is 161.8 centimetres (63.7 in) annually.

Chena Hot Springs has visibility of the Aurora borealis, especially around the March equinox.

== Aurora Ice Museum ==
The Aurora Ice Museum contains carved ice sculptures and is located at the hot springs resort is open throughout the year. Some of the sculptures depict igloos, a large chess set, and jousting knights on horseback.

== Geothermal Power Plant ==
Chena Hot Springs Resort uses two 200 kW Organic Rankine cycle (ORC) geothermal energy power plants to generate energy, the first in Alaska. The resort moved the diesel generators used in the past to a backup role since July 2006, and it is successful in reducing the cost from 30 cents/kWh to 5 cents/kWh.

== DC6 On Display ==
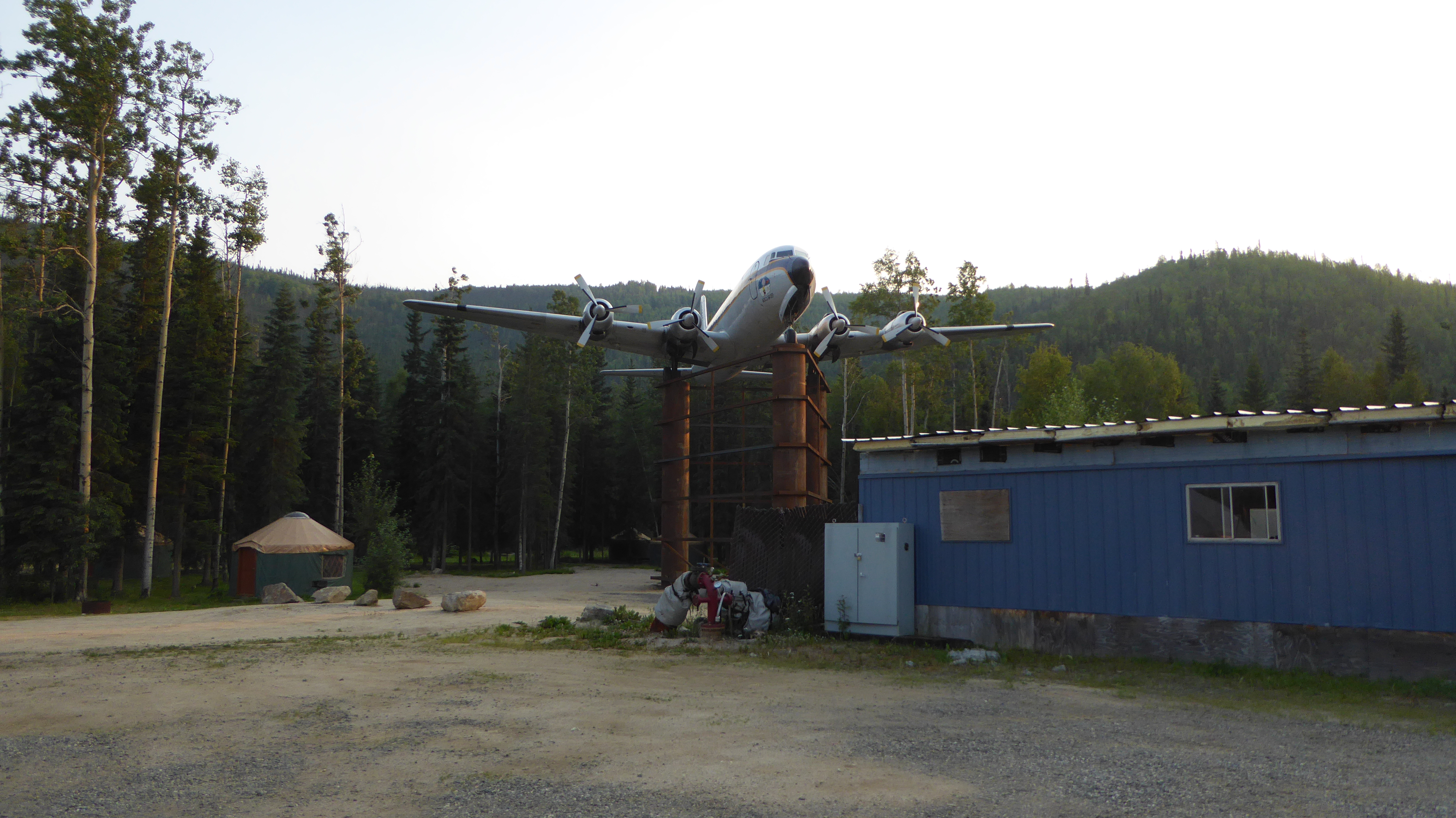
DC-6 aircraft on display at Chena Hot Springs, Alaska, USA

Everts Air Cargo retired the Douglas DC-6A N6174C “Good Grief” on October 2, 2016, after it made the final flight from Anchorage to Chena Hot Springs, after its 62-year flight career.

== See also ==
- List of hot springs in the United States § Alaska
