= John Beaver Mertie Jr. =

American geologist

- Born: January 22, 1888; Baltimore, Maryland
- Died: December 7, 1980 (aged 92)
- Education: Johns Hopkins
- Known for: mapping parts of Alaska, the Mertie Mountains
- Spouse(s): Mary Brice Garrish, Evelyn Cisney
- Scientific career
- Fields: Geology
- Workplaces: USGS, Johns Hopkins
- Thesis: (1910)

John Beaver Mertie Jr. (January 22, 1888 – December 7, 1980) was a geologist for the USGS and a professor at Johns Hopkins University. He spent 30 years mapping Alaska in the early 1900s, so much so that a mountain range was named in his honour in 1986: the Mertie Mountains located in the Yukon–Charley Rivers National Preserve. The mountains extend 187 kilometres (116 mi) by 176 kilometres (109 mi), from the Tanana River to the Yukon River; the United States Board on Geographic Names' dedication to Mertie read he "did pioneering geologic studies in Alaska for over 40 years, with a major portion of the studies pertaining to the area of these mountains".

== Biography ==
John Beaver Mertie Jr. was born on January 22, 1888, in Baltimore, Maryland to John and Margaret E. Mertie. John attended high school in Baltimore, then entering Johns Hopkins University in 1905, funding his undergraduate education working for the railroad in the summers. He intended to study chemistry, however during his senior year, Dr. Charles Swartz induced Mertie to change his major to geology. John earned a BA degree in 1908 from Johns Hopkins, was elected to Phi Beta Kappa, and received a PhD degree in geology from the same school in 1911 at the age of 23.

From 1908-1910, Mertie was employed during the summer by the U.S. Geological Survey in Colorado and New Mexico, writing his graduate thesis on the lava of the Raton area. Upon his graduation in 1911, he began his USGS career in Alaska as a petrographer. John began his field work as an assistant to LM Prindle in the Yukon–Tanana region. For the following 39 years, he covered Alaska on foot, horse, dogsled and canoe from Ketchikan to Barrow and from the Canada–US border to Cape Prince of Wales. His work in this regard, was met in precarious conditions, for instance in the summer of 1933, when the USGS budget drastically cut due to the crisis, Mertie backpacked alone from Ruby to Flat, approximately 400 miles (640 km), publishing results in another of his USGS bulletins.

He was also a surveyor, photographer, and as many early USGS geologists, due to the remoteness of their work, an amateur botanist and mathematician. During World War I he and Fred Moffit worked in military aerial photography. Moffit developed one an early instrument involving multi-lens photographs, while Mertie did the flying, worked in the darkrooms and also instructed several officers in the techniques.

Mertie's more than 70 publications are referenced to this day. He continued writing to the end; his first publication on Alaskan geology was dated 1911 and his last 1976. In 1942, Mertie retired from active field work in Alaska, continuing as a Survey employee for another 16 years until his mandatory retirement in 1958. He studied the monazite and rare-earth elements of the Appalachian Mountains. After his official retirement, he was called back on a part-time basis, furthering his mineralogical and Alaskan work almost to his death aged 92. One of his last publications was a definitive paper on the platinum deposits of the Goodnews Bay area that he revisited several times in the late 1960s. His last paper, however, was one on the monazite deposits of the Appalachians, published in 1979, at age 91, 67 years after his first publication for the USGS.

On January 9, 1986, the United States Board of Geographic Names approved naming an Alaskan mountain range after Mertie. The Mertie Mountains are located in the Yukon-Charlie Rivers National Preserve, between Fairbanks and Eagle. The range is approximately 187 km (117 miles) long and 176 km (110 miles) wide.

== Personal life ==
After receiving his doctorate, John married Mary Brice Garrish. Mary was not able to visit Alaska until 1939 but she was his field assistant during many long field trips in the Appalachians during his later years. John and Mary had one son, Robert Beaver Mertie. After Mary's death in 1965, John married Evelyn Cisney, a colleague in the USGS. Evelyn worked with John to prepare his memoirs on his Alaska work. The result is Thirty Summers and a Winter.

== Sources ==
- Mertie, Evelyn, 1982, Thirty Summers and a Winter, University of Alaska Mineral Industry Research Laboratory, School of Mineral Industry, University of Alaska, Fairbanks, Alaska, 187 pages.
- Overstreet, W.C., and Chapman, R.M., 1980, Memorial to John Beaver Mertie 1888-1980: Geological Society of American Special Publication Series, Boulder, Colorado, 6 pages.
- Mertie, Scott R. (great-grandson).
- US Board on Geographic Names; letter dated January 23, 1986.

== Bibliography ==
- Mertie, John Beaver. Platinum deposits of the Goodnews Bay district, Alaska. US Government Printing Office, 1976.
- Smith, Philip Sidney, and John Beaver Mertie. Geology and mineral resources of northwestern Alaska. Vol. 815. US Govt. Print. Off., 1930.
- Mertie, John Beaver. Notes on the geography and geology of Lituya Bay. US Government Printing Office, 1933.
- Mertie, John Beaver. "The gold pan; a neglected geological tool." Economic Geology 49.6 (1954): 639-651.
- Mertie, John Beaver. Geology of the Eagle-Circle district, Alaska. Vol. 816. US Government Printing Office, 1930.
- Mertie, John Beaver. "Structural determinations from diamond drilling."Economic Geology 38.4 (1943): 298-312.
- Mertie, John Beaver. "Stratigraphic measurements in parallel folds." Geological Society of America Bulletin 51.8 (1940): 1107-1134.
- Mertie, John Beaver. The Kaiyuh Hills, Alaska. US Government Printing Office, 1937.
