= Chena River State Recreation Area =

State park in Alaska, United States

Coordinates: 64°55′00″N 146°20′00″W

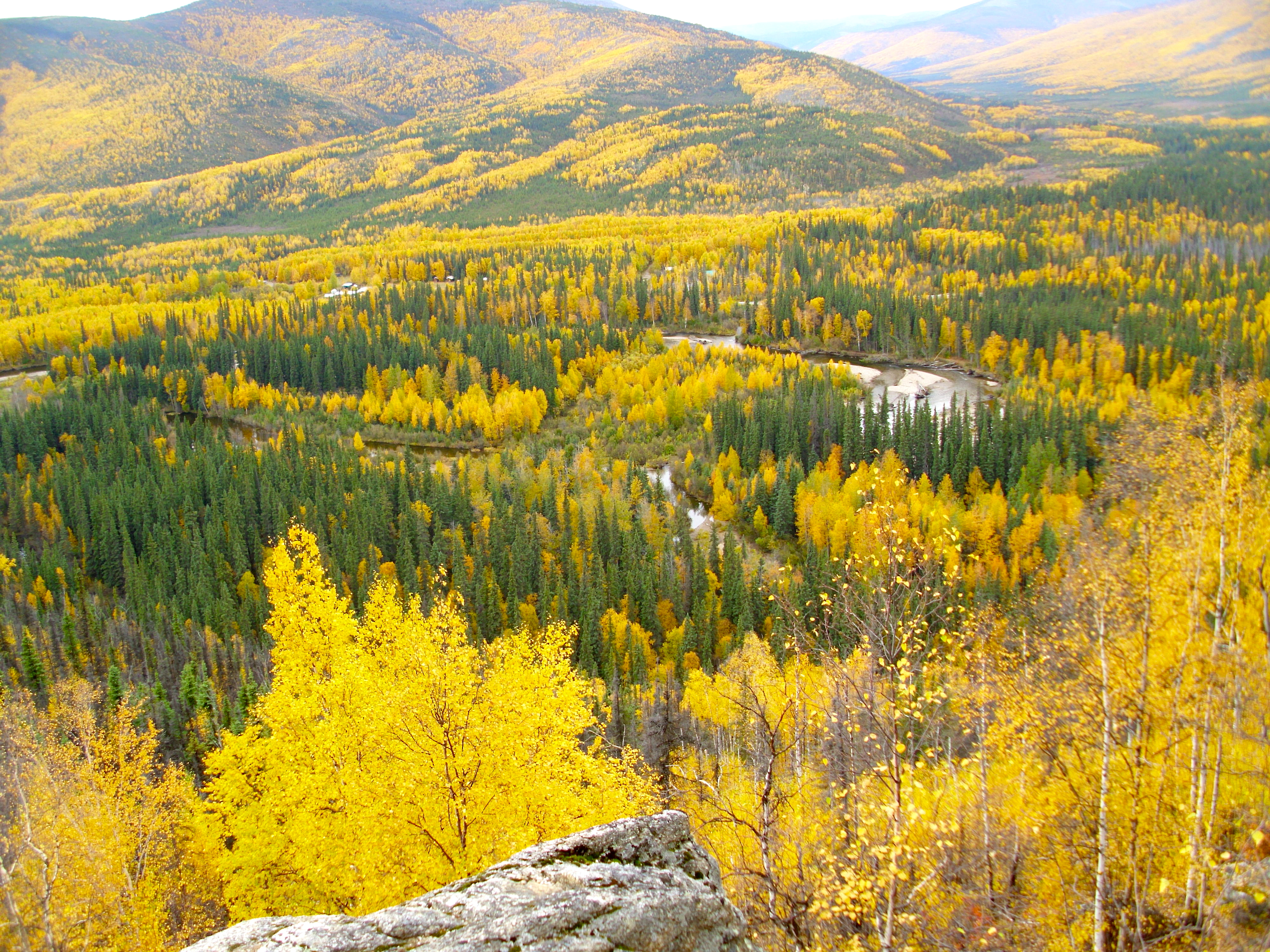
The Chena River seen from the Angel Rocks tor formation (September 2011).

Chena River State Recreation Area is a 254,080-acre (1,028.2 km^{2}) state park in the U.S. state of Alaska, located east of Fairbanks. The recreation area is centered on the Chena River. Facilities include campgrounds, hiking, ATV, snowmachine and sled dog trails, a shooting range, fishing ponds, and several public-use cabins. Fishing for Arctic grayling is catch-and-release only in the river, but visitors may keep grayling caught in the three stocked ponds. The area is also noted for several concentrations of granite tors. The road through the recreation area ends at the privately owned and operated Chena Hot Springs resort.
