= Steese National Conservation Area =

Protected area in Alaska

- IUCN category V (protected landscape/seascape)
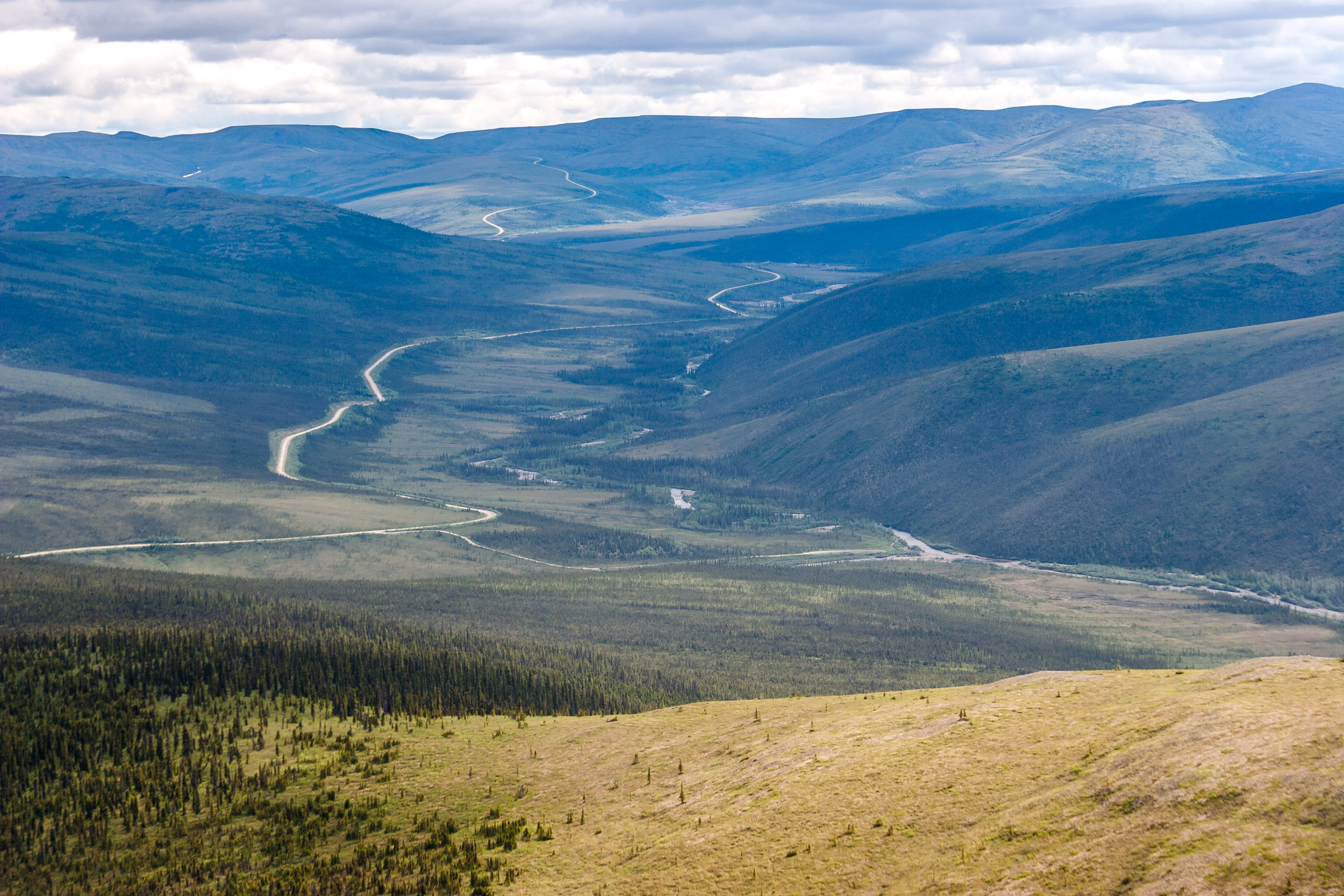

- Location within Alaska
- Location: Yukon–Koyukuk Census Area, Alaska, United States
- Nearest city: Fairbanks, Alaska
- Coordinates: 65°15′N 145°00′W
- Area: 1,200,000 acres (4,900 km^{2})
- Established: 1980
- Governing body: Bureau of Land Management
- Website: www.blm.gov/pgdata/content/ak/en/prog/nlcs/steese_conserv.html

The Steese National Conservation Area encompasses 1,200,000 acres (4,900 km^{2}) of public land about 100 miles (160 km) northeast of Fairbanks, Alaska, and is administered by the Bureau of Land Management as part of the National Landscape Conservation System. Created by the Alaska National Interest Lands Conservation Act in 1980, the Steese NCA's special values include Birch Creek National Wild River, crucial caribou calving grounds and home range, and Dall sheep habitat. While various land uses are allowed in the Steese NCA, the area is managed so that its scenic, scientific, cultural and other resources are protected.

The Steese NCA is split into the North and South Units, located on either side of the Steese Highway. The popular Pinnell Mountain National Recreation Trail skirts the edge of the North Unit.
