= White Mountains (Alaska) =

Mountain range in Alaska, U.S.

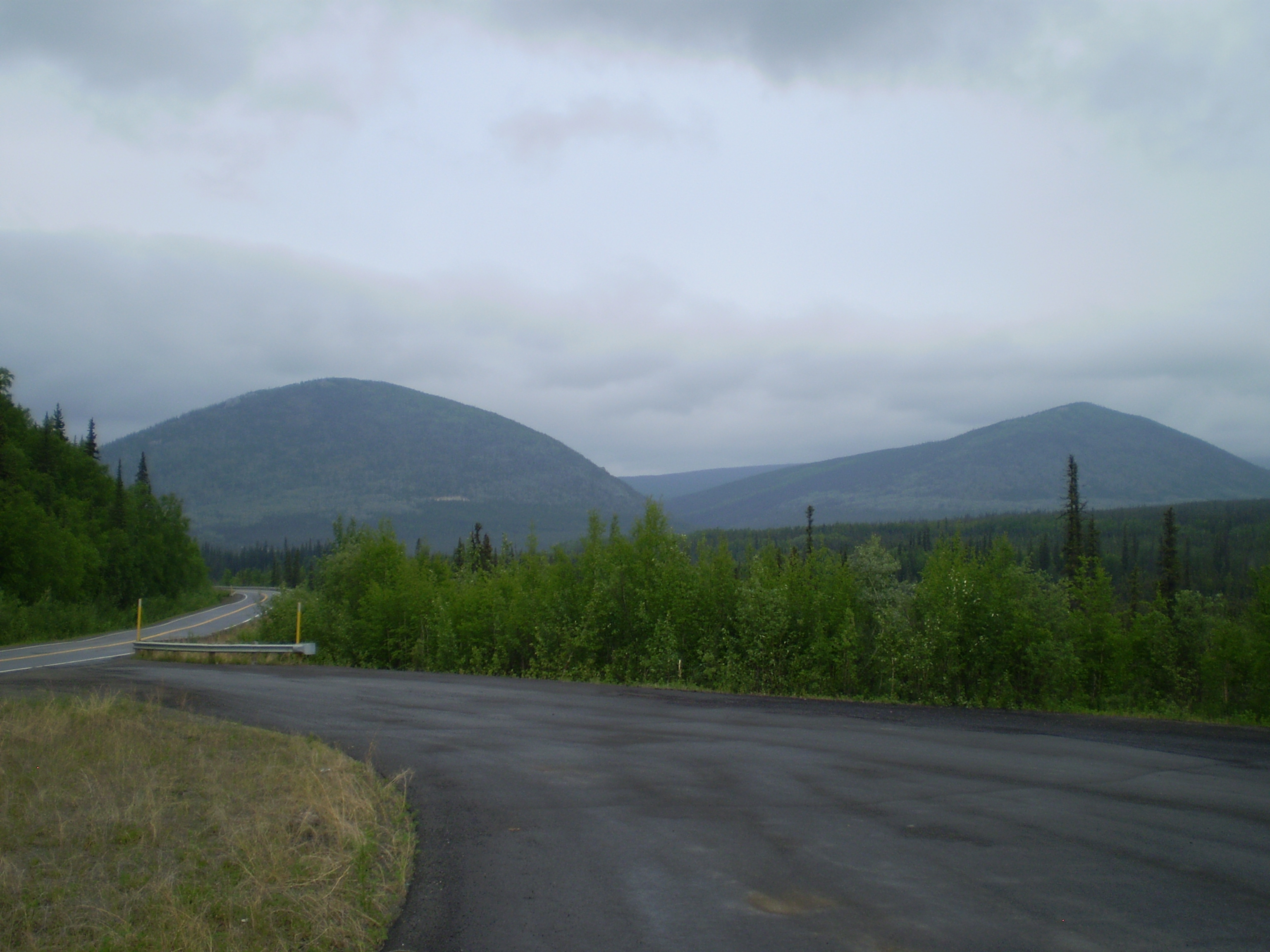
- The White Mountains with the Elliott Highway

Highest point
- Elevation: 3,205 ft (977 m)
- Coordinates: 65°31′53″N 147°32′36″W

Geography
- Location within Alaska

The White Mountains are a 71-mile (115 km) mountain range in the Yukon-Koyukuk Census Area of the U.S. state of Alaska. It lies between Beaver Creek and Preacher Creek, and was named by prospectors for its composition of white limestone. The range reaches a maximum elevation of 3,176 feet (968 m). Some of the range is located in the White Mountains National Recreation Area, a 1-million-acre (4,000 km^{2}) wilderness just 30 miles (48 km) north of Fairbanks. The White Mountains and Ray Mountains together constitute the Yukon-Tanana Uplands, an area of low mountain ranges and high ground in Interior Alaska.
