= National Register of Historic Places listings in Denali Borough, Alaska =

Location of the Denali Borough in Alaska

This is a list of the National Register of Historic Places listings in Denali Borough, Alaska.

This is intended to be a complete list of the properties and districts on the National Register of Historic Places in Denali Borough, Alaska, United States. The locations of National Register properties and districts for which the latitude and longitude coordinates are included below, may be seen in an online map.

There are 22 properties and districts listed on the National Register in the borough, including one National Historic Landmark. Another property was once listed but has been removed.

Eighteen of the properties are in Denali National Park.

This National Park Service list is complete through NPS recent listings posted July 17, 2026.

== Current listings ==
	Name on the Register	Image	Date listed	Location	City or town	Description
1	Busia Cabin		September 30, 2021 (#100004766)	Address restricted	Denali Park vicinity	
2	Dry Creek Archeological Site	Dry Creek Archeological Site	September 6, 1974 (#74000442)	Address restricted	Healy	
3	Ewe Creek Ranger Cabin No. 8	Ewe Creek Ranger Cabin No. 8	November 25, 1986 (#86003217)	5 miles (8.0 km) downstream on the Savage River from Parks Highway near Ewe Creek; 63°48′04″N 149°20′59″W	Denali National Park and Preserve	
4	Igloo Creek Cabin No. 25	Igloo Creek Cabin No. 25	November 25, 1986 (#86003208)	Near Igloo Creek at Mile 34.1 north of Park Rd. 63°36′33″N 149°35′02″W	Denali National Park and Preserve	
5	Kantishna Roadhouse	Kantishna Roadhouse	August 14, 2018 (#100002780)	Approx .1 mi. W of mi. 91 of Denali Park Rd. 63°31′31″N 150°57′39″W	Denali National Park and Preserve	
6	Little Annie Mine and Camp Site		April 11, 2022 (#100007567)	South side of Skyline Drive, approx. 1.3 mi. east of jct. with Denali Park Rd. 63°32′27″N 150°57′31″W	Denali vicinity	
7	Lower East Fork Ranger Cabin No. 9	Lower East Fork Ranger Cabin No. 9	November 25, 1986 (#86003214)	25 miles (40 km) downstream on the eastern fork of the Toklat River from Park Rd. 63°48′00″N 149°58′59″W	Denali National Park and Preserve	
8	Lower Toklat River Ranger Cabin No. 18	Lower Toklat River Ranger Cabin No. 18	November 25, 1986 (#86003222)	30 miles (48 km) north on the Toklat River from Park Rd. 63°47′46″N 150°15′10″W	Denali National Park and Preserve	
9	Lower Windy Creek Ranger Cabin No. 15	Lower Windy Creek Ranger Cabin No. 15	November 25, 1986 (#86003229)	East of Mile 324 on the Alaska Railroad; 63°26′23″N 148°53′09″W	Denali National Park and Preserve	
10	Moose Creek Ranger Cabin No. 19	Moose Creek Ranger Cabin No. 19	November 25, 1986 (#86003231)	5 miles (8.0 km) north of Mile 73.8 on Park Rd. 63°29′06″N 150°37′22″W	Denali National Park and Preserve	
11	Mount McKinley National Park Headquarters District	Mount McKinley National Park Headquarters District	October 23, 1987 (#87000975)	Mile 3.4 on the McKinley Park Highway; 63°43′16″N 148°57′56″W	Denali National Park and Preserve	Boundary increase approved May 10, 2018
12	Mount McKinley National Park Road Historic District	Mount McKinley National Park Road Historic District	June 30, 2020 (#100004070)	Mile 237.3 George Parks Hwy. (AK 3); 63°30′24″N 150°03′10″W	Denali National Park and Preserve	
13	Peter Nelson Cabin Site		April 11, 2022 (#100007576)	Along the south side of Eureka Creek roughly 2,300 feet northeast from its confluence with Lucky Gulch. 63°32′45″N 150°52′42″W	Denali National Park and Preserve	
14	Fannie Quigley House	Fannie Quigley House	December 13, 2019 (#100004765)	Mile 92 of Denali Park Rd., approx. 270 ft. NE of terminus at the Kantishna Airstrip; 63°32′23″N 150°59′20″W	Denali National Park and Preserve	
15	Riley Creek Ranger Cabin No. 20	Riley Creek Ranger Cabin No. 20	November 25, 1986 (#86003225)	5 miles (8.0 km) cross-country and west of Mile 336 on the Alaska Railroad; 63°34′55″N 148°57′32″W	Denali National Park and Preserve	
16	Sanctuary River Cabin No. 31	Sanctuary River Cabin No. 31	November 25, 1986 (#86003206)	On the Sanctuary River at Mile 22.7 south of Park Rd. 63°43′22″N 149°28′24″W	Denali National Park and Preserve	
17	Sushana River Ranger Cabin No. 17	Sushana River Ranger Cabin No. 17	November 25, 1986 (#86003227)	10 miles (16 km) cross-country and north of Mile 25 on Park Rd. 63°47′57″N 149°45′01″W	Denali National Park and Preserve	
18	Teklanika Archeological District	Teklanika Archeological District	January 31, 1976 (#76000171)	Address restricted	Denali National Park and Preserve	
19	Toklat Ranger Station (Pearson Cabin), No. 4	Toklat Ranger Station (Pearson Cabin), No. 4	November 25, 1986 (#86003207)	Near the main branch of the Toklat River at Mile 53.8 west of Park Rd. 63°30′55″N 150°02′59″W	Denali National Park and Preserve	
20	Upper East Fork Cabin No. 29	Upper East Fork Cabin No. 29	November 25, 1986 (#86003209)	Near the eastern fork of the Toklat River at Mile 43 south of Park Rd. 63°33′28″N 149°46′50″W	Denali National Park and Preserve	
21	Upper Toklat River Cabin No. 24	Upper Toklat River Cabin No. 24	November 25, 1986 (#86003211)	Near the main branch of the Toklat River at Mile 53.7 west of Park Rd. 63°31′05″N 150°02′53″W	Denali National Park and Preserve	
22	Upper Windy Creek Ranger Cabin No. 7	Upper Windy Creek Ranger Cabin No. 7	November 25, 1986 (#86003219)	6 miles (9.7 km) west of Cantwell and south of Windy Creek; 63°26′10″N 149°01′36″W	Denali National Park and Preserve	

== Former listings ==
	Name on the Register	Image	Date listed	Date removed	Location	City or town	Description
1	Mine Safety Car 5		September 15, 1977 (#77000228)	February 15, 1985	About 5.3 miles (8.5 km) east of Healy, on Healy Spur Road; 63°51′21″N 148°50′54″W	Healy	Originally located in Suntrana coal mine area, which was completely dismantled in compliance with AML (Abandoned Mine Lands Program) between 2006 and 2008 Delisted when it was relocated to the Alaska Museum of Transportation in Wasilla

== See also ==
- List of National Historic Landmarks in Alaska
- National Register of Historic Places listings in Alaska
