= Murie =

Murie may refer to:

People

- Murie family of American naturalists, including:
  - Olaus Murie (1889–1963)
  - Adolph Murie (1899–1974)
  - Margaret Murie (1902–2003)
  - Louise Murie (1912–2012)
- David Murie (b. 1976) Scottish footballer

Other

- Murie Ranch Historic District inholding in Grand Teton National Park
  - Murie Residence
- Murie Science and Learning Center
- Murie railway station on the Walhalla narrow gauge line in Gippsland, Victoria, Australia
- Murié, an alternate spelling of Muriaé, which is a city of roughly 100,000 in the Brazilian state of Minas Gerais

== Similar spellings ==
- Mury (disambiguation)
- Muir (disambiguation)
