= Muir (surname) =

Muir is a surname. Notable people with the surname include:

== A ==
- Adam Muir (born 1971), Australian rugby league footballer
- Alan Muir (anatomist) (1925–1974), British anatomist
- Alan Muir (footballer) (1922–1996), Australian rules footballer
- Alan Muir (referee) (born 1975), Scottish football referee
- Alex Muir (1923–1995), Scottish footballer
- Alex Muir (Albion Rovers footballer), Scottish footballer
- Alexander Muir (1830–1906), Canadian songwriter, poet and school headmaster
- Amy Muir (born 2000), Scottish footballer
- Andrew Muir (chess player) (born 1958), Scottish chess player
- Andrew Muir (politician) (born 1976), Northern Irish politician

== B ==
- Barry Muir (1937–2022), Australian rugby league footballer
- Bill Muir (born 1942), American football coach
- Bob Muir (footballer) (1907–1973), Australian rules footballer
- Bobby Muir (1876–1953), Scottish footballer
- Bryan Muir (born 1973), Canadian National Hockey League player

== C ==
- Charles Henry Muir (1860–1933), U.S. Army officer
- Chris Muir (born 1958), American cartoonist
- Christopher Muir (1931–2022), Australian director and producer

== D ==
- Daniel Muir (born 1983), American former National Football League player
- Daniel Muir (footballer), Scottish footballer of the 1920s and 1930s
- David Muir (disambiguation)
- Debbie Muir (born 1953), Canadian former synchronized swimmer and coach

== E ==
- Edwin Muir (1887–1959), British poet, novelist and translator, husband of Willa Muir
- Esther Muir (1903–1995), American actress

== F ==
- Florabel Muir (1889–1970), American journalist, writer, and newspaper columnist
- Francis Muir (born 1926), British geophysicist
- Frank Muir (1920–1998), British comedian
- Frederick Muir (1849–1921), Australian cricketer
- Frederick Arthur Godfrey Muir (1873–1931), British entomologist

== G ==
- Gary Muir (born 1985), Scottish footballer

== H ==
- Harry Muir (fl. 1960s–1980s), owner of Beck Book Company, forerunner of Wakefield Press in Adelaide, South Australia
- Helen Muir (1920–2005), British biochemist
- Helen Muir (reporter) (1911–2006), American reporter and author
- Hope Muir (born 1970/1971), Canadian dancer, rehearsal director and teacher

== I ==
- Ian Muir (Scottish footballer) (1929–2009), Scottish footballer
- Ian Muir (English footballer) (born 1963), English footballer
- Ian Fraser Muir (1921–2008), English plastic surgeon

== J ==
- Jamie Muir (1942–2025), Scottish painter and former percussionist
- Jamie Muir (politician) (born 1941), Canadian educator and politician
- Jean Muir (1928–1995), British fashion designer
- Jean Muir (actress) (1911–1996), American actress
- Jo Muir (born 1994), British modern pentathlete
- John Muir (disambiguation)

== K ==
- Kado Muir, Aboriginal Australian artist and land rights advocate
- Karen Muir (1952–2013), South African swimmer
- Kenneth Muir (disambiguation)
- Kirsty Muir (born 2004), Scottish freestyle skier

== L ==
- Laura Muir (born 1993), Scottish athlete
- Leilani Muir (1944–2016), Canadian plaintiff
- Lewis F. Muir (1883–1915), American composer
- Lindsay Muir (born 1956), Scottish footballer
- Lois Muir (born 1935), New Zealand sportswoman

== M ==
- M. M. Pattison Muir (1848–1931), British chemist and author
- Malcolm Muir (publisher) (1885–1979), American magazine publisher
- Malcolm Muir (judge) (1914–2011), American judge
- Malcolm S. Muir (1930–1995), British epidemiologist
- Marjorie Muir Worthington (1900–1976), American writer
- Mary Muir (1881–1962), New Zealand nurse
- Maud Muir (born 2001), English rugby union player
- Mike Muir (born 1964), American singer

== N ==
- Nat Muir (born 1958), Scottish athlete
- Nina Catherine Muir (1900–1981), New Zealand doctor
- Norrie Muir (1948–2019), British mountaineer

== P ==
- Percy Muir (1894–1979), English antiquarian bookseller, book collector and bibliographer

== R ==
- Renee LaMark Muir, American politician
- Richard David Muir (1857–1924), British prosecutor
- Ricky Muir (born 1980), Australian politician
- Robert Muir (disambiguation)
- Ross Muir (born 1995), Scottish snooker player
- Ruby Muir (born 1991), cross-country runner from New Zealand

== T ==
- Tamsyn Muir (born 1985), novelist from New Zealand
- Thomas Muir (mathematician) (1844–1934), British mathematician
- Thomas Muir of Huntershill (1765–1799), Scottish political reformer

== W ==
- Walter Muir (1905–1999), American correspondence chess player
- Walter Muir (soccer) (born 1953), Scottish footballer
- Ward Muir (1878–1927), English photographer
- Willa Muir (1890–1970), Scottish novelist, essayist and translator, wife of Edwin Muir
- William Muir (disambiguation)

== Fictional characters ==
- Lucy Muir, in the 1947 film The Ghost and Mrs. Muir
  - Carolyn Muir, in the subsequent TV series The Ghost & Mrs. Muir
