= Muir =

"Muir" is the Scots word for "moorland", and the Irish and Scots Gaelic for "sea", and is the etymological origin of the surname and Clan Muir/Mure/Moore in Scotland and other parts of the world.

== Places ==
=== United States ===
- Muir, Michigan, a village
- Muir, Pennsylvania, a census-designated place
- Camp Muir, a high altitude refuge on Mount Rainier, Washington
- Mount Muir in the Sierra Nevada, California
- Muir Pass in the Sierra Nevada
- Muir Glacier, Alaska
- Muir Grove, a giant sequoia grove in Sequoia National Park, California
- Muir site, an archaeological site in Jessamine County, Kentucky

=== Elsewhere ===
- Muir Peak, Antarctica
- Lake Muir, Western Australia
- Mount Muir (High Rock Range), Canada
- Muir, a community in the township of Norwich, Ontario, Canada
- Muir Seamount, an underwater volcano in the Atlantic Ocean north of Bermuda

== Schools ==
- Muir College (disambiguation)
- John Muir High School, Pasadena, California, United States
- Bishopbriggs Academy, Bishopbriggs, Scotland, once known as Thomas Muir High School
- Muir Middle School (disambiguation)
- Muir Elementary School (disambiguation)

== People and fictional characters ==
- Muir (surname), a list of people and fictional characters
- Muir (given name), a list of people
- Clan Muir, a Scottish clan

== Other uses ==
- Muir baronets, a title in the Baronetage of the United Kingdom
- USS Muir, a World War II destroyer escort
- Muir Army Airfield, a military airfield near Annville, Pennsylvania
- Muir Highway, a regional highway in Western Australia.
- Muir House (disambiguation), various buildings on the US National Register of Historic Places
- Muir Homes, a privately owned housebuilding company in Scotland
- Muir Island, a fictional island in the Marvel Comics universe
