= Murie Science and Learning Center =

The Murie Science and Learning Center is a collaboration between the Denali National Park and Preserve, seven additional National Parks and several park partners.." The Murie Science and Learning Center promotes scientific research to aid park managers and provide science-based education programs and information to students, educational institutions and the visiting public.

The center is named after the Murie family of naturalists, who made significant, influential studies of arctic ecosystems. Olaus Murie and Margaret Murie were active in the establishment of the Arctic National Wildlife Refuge and The Wilderness Society. Olaus's brother Adolph Murie was equally influential, studying wolves in Denali in the 1930s.

== See also ==
The additional parks which partner with Denali National Park in this venture:

- Bering Land Bridge National Preserve
- Cape Krusenstern National Monument
- Gates of the Arctic National Park and Preserve
- Kobuk Valley National Park
- Noatak National Preserve
- Wrangell–St. Elias National Park and Preserve
- Yukon–Charley Rivers National Preserve
