= Malcolm Muir =

Malcolm Muir may refer to:

- Malcolm Muir (publisher) (1885–1979), American magazine publisher
- Malcolm Muir (judge) (1914–2011), United States district judge
- Malcolm S. Muir (1930–1995), British epidemiologist
