= Cary Judd =

American singer-songwriter

- Birth name: Cary Dirk Judd
- Born: March 4, 1976 (age 49); Thousand Oaks, California, United States
- Genres: Transcendental pop
- Occupation(s): Musician, singer-songwriter
- Instrument(s): Vocals, piano, guitar
- Years active: 2003–present
- Labels: China Mountain Records
- Website: thevacationist.bandcamp.com

Cary Dirk Judd (born March 4, 1976) is an American singer-songwriter from Boise, Idaho. He has released four solo albums on the China Mountain Records label, and has written an ebook on touring for independent musicians. Judd performed on Treasure Valley View in 2012. Judd is a member of The Vacationist, and is a former member of The Blaqks and Fires in France. Judd owns Wormhole Studios in Boise where he is also a Producer, Photographer, Digital artist and Music Video Director. Judd also recently announced the resurrection of Danny Blaqk for the solo dB ep, "Greatest Hits Volume 1". Set for release on 11/26/16. A new Vacationist album, "Prime Colours/Bright Numbers" released on 01/01/17.

== Personal life ==
Judd was born and raised in Thousand Oaks, California. After he began touring, he moved to Moose, WY, a small village inside Grand Teton National Park, located 12 miles north of Jackson, Wyoming. Judd currently lives in Boise with his partner, Jenny, and has three children, a son and two daughters.

Judd lives with a rare mental condition known as Low Latent Inhibition, which he credits for his creativity.

== Career ==
Judd created the China Mountains Records record label for his own releases. His debut album was Perfect Uncertain, released in 2003, followed by Looking Back From Space in 2006. He tours in support of his music, and has written an ebook on touring called The Tour Field Manual, written for musicians who wish to tour without tour support from major record labels or booking agents.

His 2009 album Goodnight Human featured Scot Alexander of Dishwalla on bass on the song "Kiss Comes to Shove." The album has received generally positive reviews, and was rated the #2 album of 2009 by Kristin Houser of LAMusicBlog.com. A single from the album, "Huang Shan (The Ah-ha Song)," was picked up for distribution by Sony Red and released by them as a single in October 2009. Cary released an EP called Trillions in early 2010 with producers Mikal Blue and Andrew Williams.

Judd is listed through NACA, the National Association for Campus Activities. He has performed shows/festivals with or opened for: Fictionist, Neon Trees, Rocky Votolato, Of Montreal, Owen, Margot and The Nuclear So and So's, Joshua James, Tristan Prettyman, Citizen Cope, Graham Colton, Pedro The Lion, Tyler Hilton, Ryan Shupe & the RubberBand, Raining Jane (current backing band for Jason Mraz), Five Times August, among others, and has played concerts at numerous venues and colleges across the United States.

Judd uses a number of instruments and computer generated sounds to achieve his tone. "I utilize whatever technology I can get my hands on to increase the dynamic range of my songs. This includes but is not limited to looping machines, drum machines, computer based sounds and programs, and an array of other effects that broaden the sound I'm capable of as a one man show."

Judd has also been a part of the bands Fires in France (bass and back up vocals) and The Blaqks (vocals and guitar) as his alter ego, "Danny Blaqk". He is currently performing with the band The Vacationist, whose first album was released on 10 October 2014. Judd plays a STS205CENT Teton Guitar.

== Discography ==
- Perfect Uncertain (2003)
- Looking Back From Space (2006)
- Goodnight Human (2009)
- Trillions (2010)
- The Funeral Party (2013)
- The Vacationist (2014)
- Danny Blaqk: Greatest Hits Volume 1 (2016)
- Prime Colours/Bright Numbers (2017)
