= Upper East Fork Cabin No. 29 =

- U.S. National Register of Historic Places
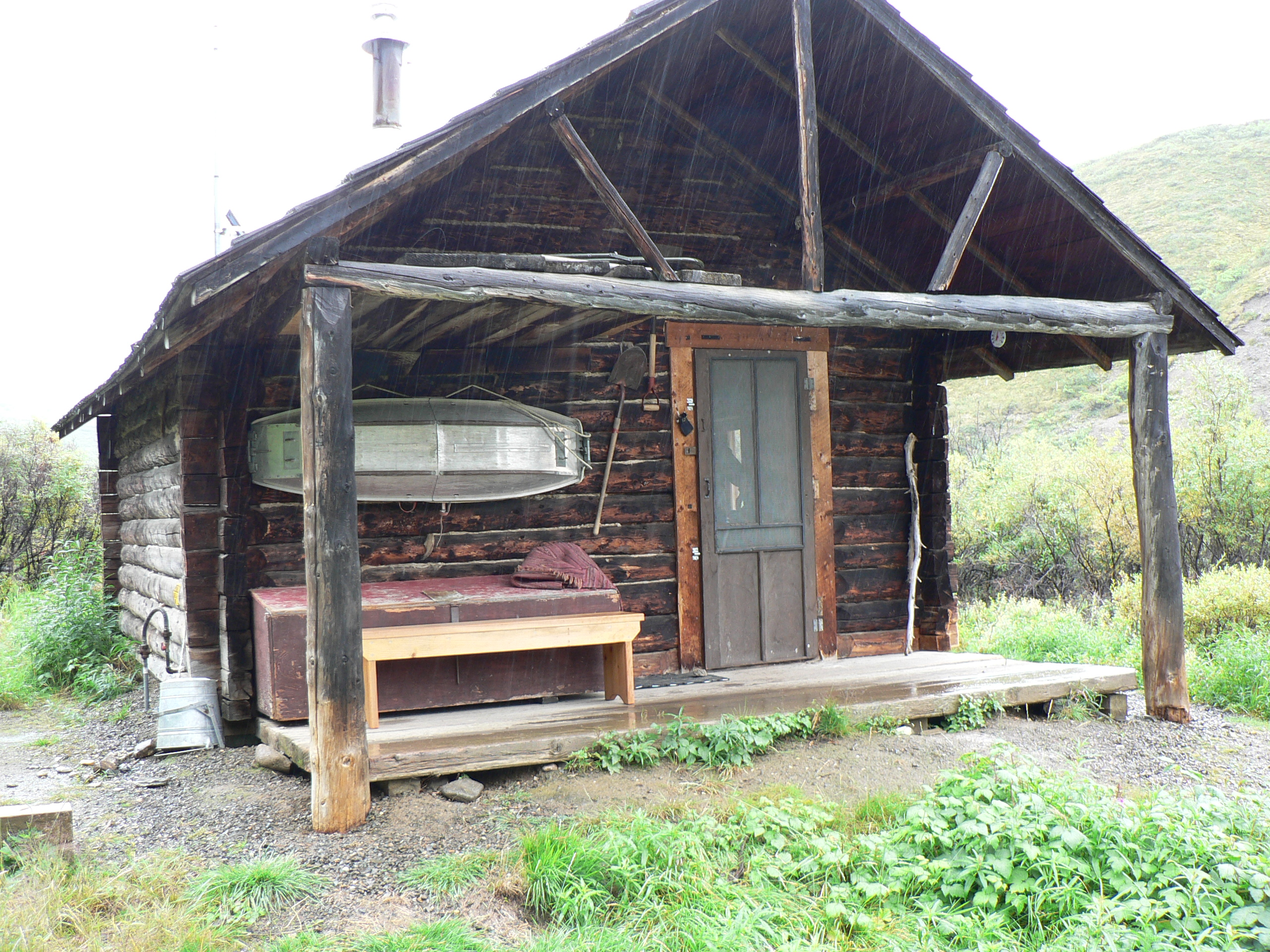

- Location within Alaska
- Location: Near the East Fork of Toklat River at Mile 43, south of Park Road, Denali National Park and Preserve, Alaska, U.S.
- Coordinates: 63°33′28″N 149°46′50″W
- Area: less than one acre
- Built: 1929
- Built by: Alaska Road Commission; National Park Service
- MPS: Patrol Cabins, Mount McKinley National Park TR
- NRHP reference No.: 86003209
- Added to NRHP: November 25, 1986

Upper East Fork Cabin No. 29, also known as Upper East Fork Patrol Cabin and East Fork Cabin, is a log shelter in the National Park Service Rustic style in Denali National Park. The cabin is part of a network of shelters for patrolling park rangers throughout the park. It is a standard design by the National Park Service Branch of Plans and Designs and was built in 1929 by the Alaska Road Commission as a shelter for crews working on the trans-park road, one of four shelters built at ten-mile intervals along the road. The cabin was used by Adolph Murie as a base for his program of wolf observation in 1940 and 1941.
