= John Muir (disambiguation) =

John Muir (1838–1914) was a Scottish-born American environmentalist and author.

John Muir may also refer to:

== People ==
- John Muir (indologist) (1810–1882), British linguist
- John Muir (businessman) (1828–1903), Scottish businessman, founder of Finlay Muir & Co, and Lord Provost of Glasgow
- John Ramsay Muir (1872–1941), British Member of Parliament
- John Muir (South African naturalist) (1874–1947), Scottish-born South African physician, naturalist and historian
- John Muir (trade unionist) (1879–1931), British journalist and Member of Parliament
- John Muir (footballer, born 1903), Scottish footballer
- John Muir (engineer) (1918–1977), American engineer and author
- John Muir (footballer, born 1947) (1947–2018), Scottish footballer
- John Kenneth Muir (born 1969), American author
- John Muir (judge) (1944–2018), judge on the Supreme Court of Queensland, Australia

== Other uses ==
- John Muir College, an undergraduate college of the University of California, San Diego
- "John Muir", a song by Schoolboy Q from Blank Face LP

== See also ==
- John Muir Award (disambiguation)
- John Muir Branch Library, Los Angeles
- John Muir Country Park, East Lothian, Scotland
- John Muir Health, a health care service
- John Muir National Historic Site, in the San Francisco Bay area, California
- John Muir Parkway, part of California State Route 4
- John Muir Publications, an American publisher best known for publishing Rick Steves, acquired by Avalon Publishing Group
- John Muir Trail, California
- John Muir Trail (Tennessee)
- John Muir Trust, a Scottish charity
- John Muir Way, a coastal path in East Lothian
- John Muir Wilderness, California
- Muir Middle School (disambiguation)
