= Murie Residence =

Historic house in Wyoming, United States

- U.S. National Register of Historic Places
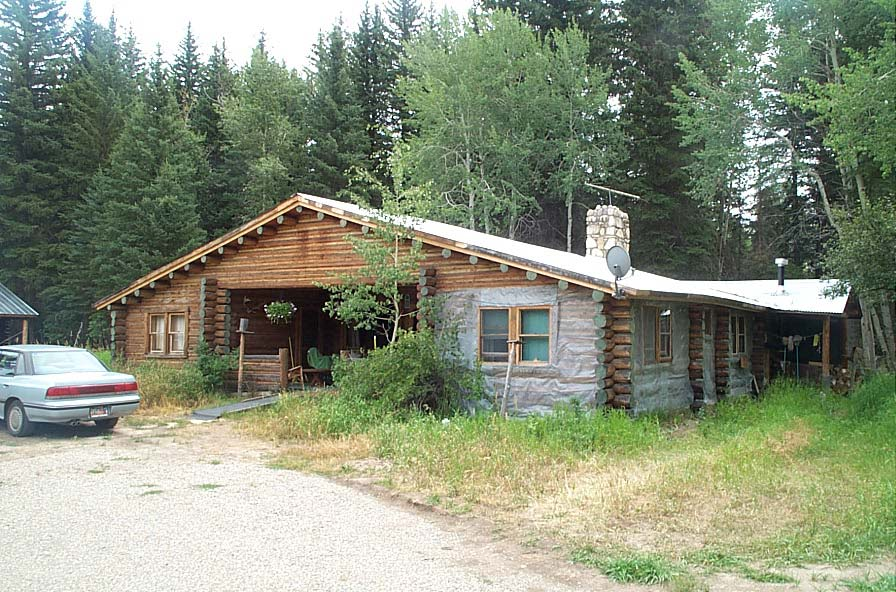

- Location within Wyoming Location within the United States
- Nearest city: Moose, Wyoming
- Coordinates: 43°38′59.860″N 110°43′39.630″W
- MPS: Grand Teton National Park MPS
- NRHP reference No.: 90000616
- Added to NRHP: April 23, 1990

The Murie Residence was the home of naturalists and conservationists Olaus and Mardie Murie. Located near Moose, Wyoming in the southern end of Grand Teton National Park, the house and adjoining studio are now part of the Murie Ranch Historic District, a National Historic Landmark encompassing the Murie residence and the former STS Ranch, home to Olaus' brother Adolph.

The Murie Residence was individually listed on the National Register of Historic Places on April 23, 1990, with the remainder of the property designated as a National Historic District in 1997.

The Murie Residence Today

In 1997, the Murie Center was established in partnership with Grand Teton National Park, as a non-profit organization dedicated to stewardship of the Murie Ranch and the continuation of the Murie legacy. In 2001, the center launched a campaign to restore the buildings and improve the Ranch infrastructure, reawakening the Ranch as the Muries envisioned it, a center for study, discussion and debate on behalf of nature. In 2006, the Murie Ranch was designated a National Historic Landmark, commemorating its national significance to the history of the United States as home to the Murie family and their legacy of conservation.

== See also ==
- Historical buildings and structures of Grand Teton National Park
