= Lower East Fork Ranger Cabin No. 9 =

- U.S. National Register of Historic Places
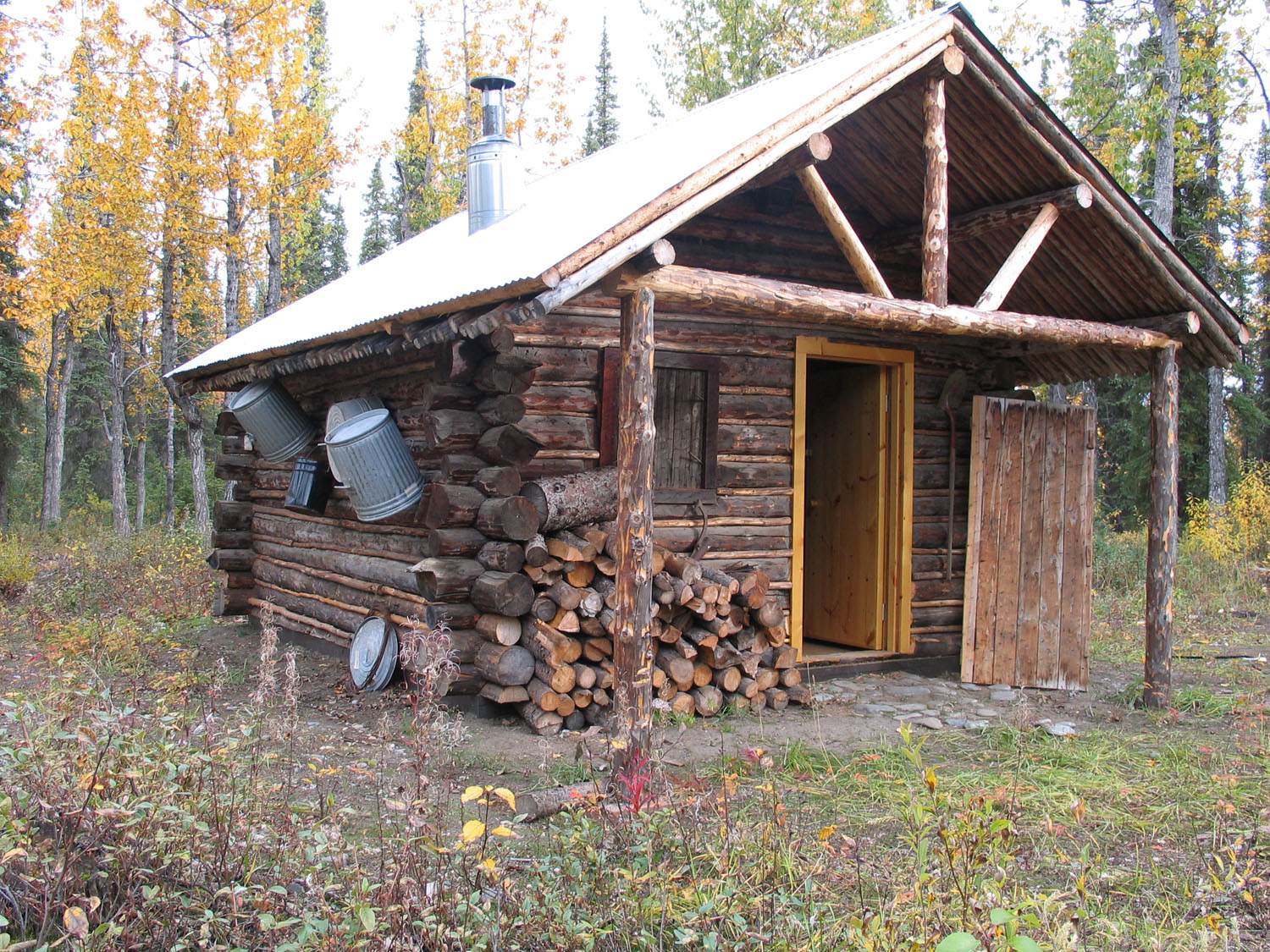
- Lower East Fork Ranger Cabin

- Location within Alaska
- Location: 25 miles (40 km) downstream on the East fork of the Toklat River from Park Road, Denali National Park and Preserve, Alaska, U.S.
- Coordinates: 63°48′0″N 149°58′59″W
- Area: less than one acre
- Built: 1930
- Built by: National Park Service
- MPS: Patrol Cabins, Mount McKinley National Park TR
- NRHP reference No.: 86003214
- Added to NRHP: November 25, 1986

The Lower East Fork Ranger Cabin No. 9, also known as the Lower East Fork Patrol Cabin, is a log shelter in the National Park Service Rustic style in Denali National Park. The cabin is part of a network of shelters used by patrolling park rangers throughout the park. It is a standard design by the National Park Service Branch of Plans and Designs and was built in 1930. The cabin has a separate log dog kennel, also to a standard Park Service design.

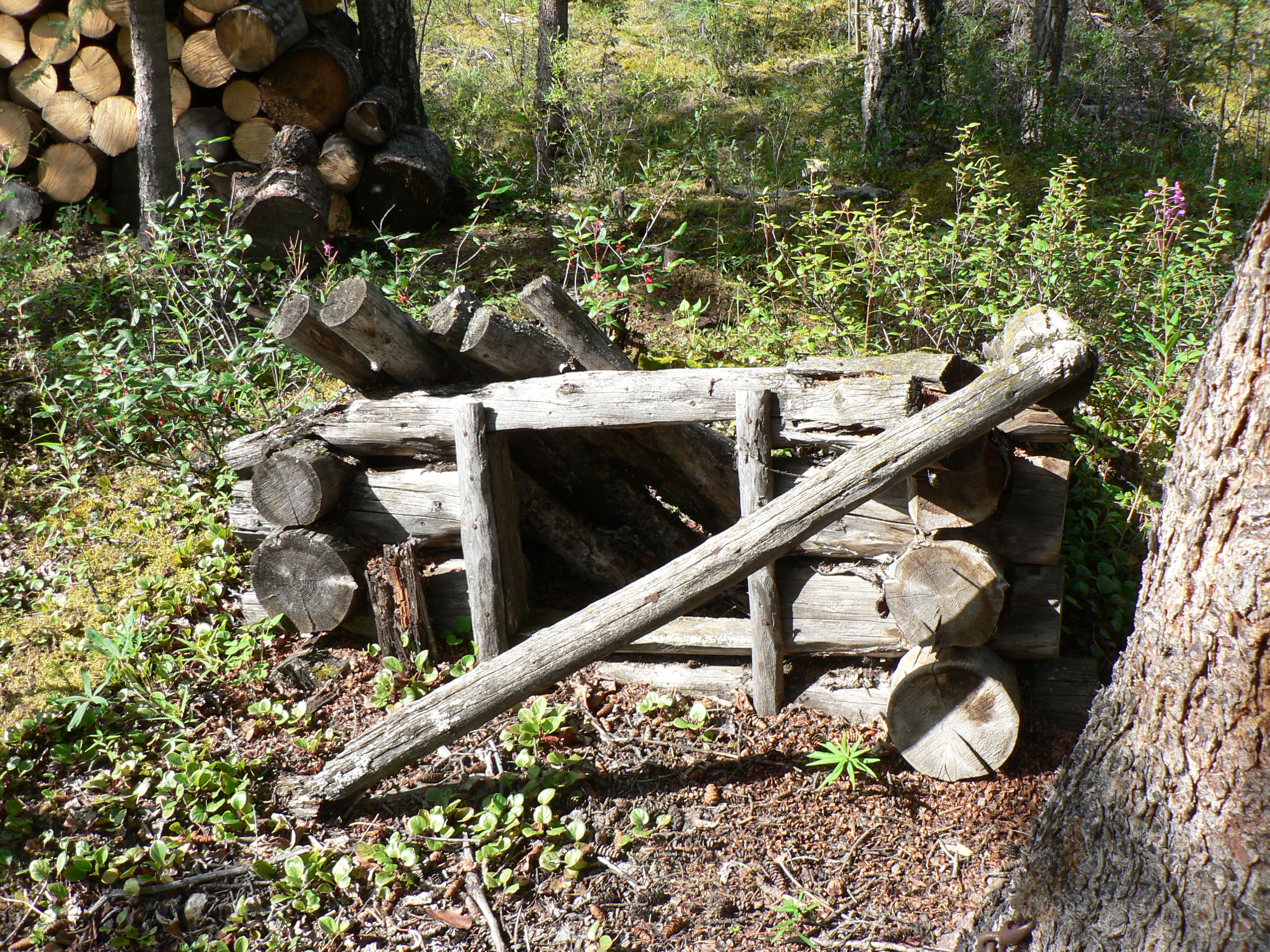
Lower East Fork dog kennel
