= Pearson Cabin =

- Toklat Ranger Station–Pearson Cabin No. 4
- U.S. National Register of Historic Places
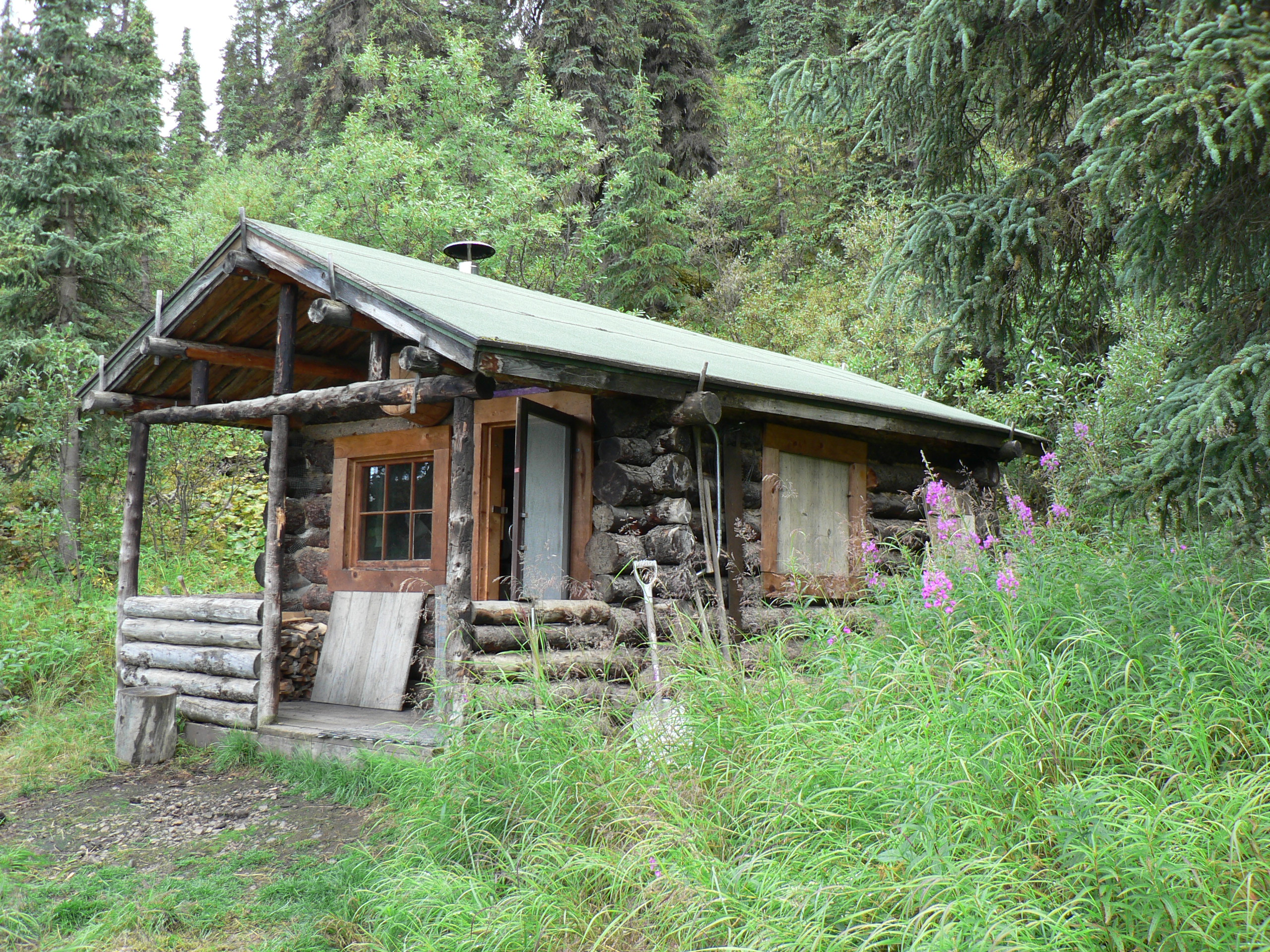

- Location within Alaska
- Location: Near the main branch of the Toklat River at Mile 53.8, west of Park Road, Denali National Park & Preserve, Alaska
- Coordinates: 63°30′55″N 150°2′59″W
- Area: less than one acre
- Built: 1927
- Built by: National Park Service
- Architectural style: Log cabin
- MPS: Patrol Cabins, Mount McKinley National Park TR
- NRHP reference No.: 86003207
- Added to NRHP: November 25, 1986

The Pearson Cabin, also known as Toklat Ranger Station No. 4, is a log shelter in the National Park Service Rustic style in Denali National Park in Alaska. It was listed on the National Register of Historic Places in 1986. It is a standard design by the National Park Service Branch of Plans and Designs and was built in 1927.

It is significant as the oldest patrol cabin in Denali park that was built entirely by park rangers, and is likely the only surviving one.
