= Dry Creek Archeological Site =

Archaeological site in Alaska, United States

- U.S. National Register of Historic Places
- U.S. National Historic Landmark
- Alaska Heritage Resources Survey
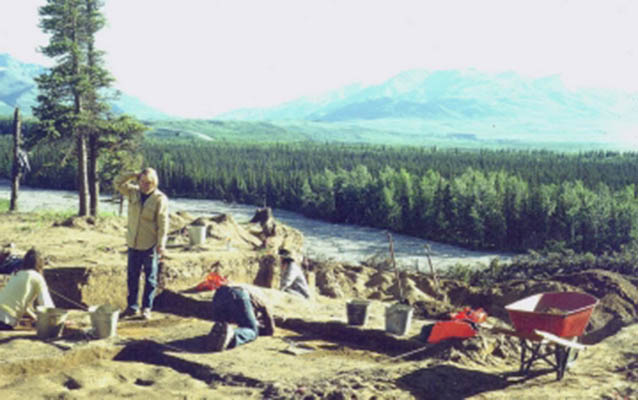
- Archaeologists at work at Dry Creek

- Location within Alaska
- Location: Address restricted, Denali Borough, Alaska, U.S.
- Nearest city: Healy, Alaska
- NRHP reference No.: 74000442
- AHRS No.: HEA-005

Significant dates
- Added to NRHP: September 6, 1974
- Designated NHL: June 2, 1978

The Dry Creek Archeological Site is located on the northern flanks of the Alaska Range, near Healy, Alaska, in the Nenana River watershed, not far outside Denali National Park and Preserve. It is a multi-component site, whose stratified remains have yielded evidence of human occupation as far back as 11,000 years ago. There are four major components to the site, layered in an outwash terrace overlooking Dry Creek, with layers of loess (wind-deposited materials) separating them.

The most recent component of the site dates to 2600–1400 BCE. The youngest component is one of the few places in the Alaskan interior where notched projectile points have been found. The two oldest components are dated to 8,500–9,000 BCE, and include assemblages of microblade stone technology. The bottom layer yielded a collection of more than 3,500 artifacts, primarily stone flakes. One of the more prominent finds is a stone scraping tool with a triangular head, measuring 31 by 16 millimetres (1.22 in × 0.63 in).

Multiple types of stone tools have been found at the site, as have remains of processing a variety of animals. The site is valuable for the insight it yields into the critical transitional period at the end of the most recent Ice Age. The site was first discovered by C. E. Holmes in 1973, with major excavations following in the late 1970s, with further research occurring in the 1990s.

The site was listed on the National Register of Historic Places in 1974, and was declared a National Historic Landmark in 1978.

== See also ==
- List of National Historic Landmarks in Alaska
- National Register of Historic Places listings in Denali Borough, Alaska
