= Murie family =

American family of naturalists

Murie
- Country: United States
- Current region: Grand Teton National Park
- Members: Olaus Murie, Adolph Murie, Margaret Murie, Louise Murie MacLeod
- Distinctions: Contributions to natural history, biodiversity conservation, and land preservation
- Traditions: Natural history, ecological research, conservation advocacy
- Estates: Jackson Hole, Wyoming
- Website: Jackson Hole Conservation Alliance, Murie Center

Murie is the name of a famed American family of naturalists, brothers Olaus (1889–1963) and Adolph (1899–1974), and their wives Margaret "Mardy" (1902–2003) and Louise "Weezy" (1912-2012).

Based in Grand Teton National Park, the Muries were active throughout the twentieth century. The Murie Family was strongly committed to maintaining the biodiversity of Jackson Hole and during the lifetimes of Mardy and Weezy helped establish the Jackson Hole Conservation Alliance.

Olaus Murie was a talented artist and a pioneering field biologist for the U.S. Bureau of Biological Survey. He left federal service in 1945 to become the president of The Wilderness Society, which helped establish the Arctic National Wildlife Refuge and was influential in the passage of Wilderness Act of 1964.

Adolph Murie, an ecologist, was a pioneering advocate of bio-diversity and was a major promoter of the Denali National Park.

Margaret Murie (married Olaus, 1924) helped bring about the passage of the Alaska National Interest Lands Conservation Act, the greatest land preservation act in U.S. history, and was the recipient of the Presidential Medal of Freedom in 1998.

Louise Murie (now MacLeod), a botanist, accompanied her husband Adolph (married 1932) on twenty-five expeditions to Mount McKinley (now Denali) National Park. She served on the board of directors of the Jackson Hole Conservation Alliance and the Murie Center.
