= David Muir (disambiguation) =

David Muir (born 1973) is an American television news reporter and presenter.

David Muir may also refer to:

- David S. Muir (born 1971), Scottish political communicator
- David Muir (Australian footballer) (born 1971), Australian rules footballer for the Fremantle Dockers
- David Muir (footballer, born 1988), Scottish footballer
- David Muir, actor in the film Dr. Hackenstein
- Sir David Muir, Agent-General for Queensland, 1951–1964

== See also ==
- Sir Richard David Muir (1857–1924), British prosecutor
