= Moose, Wyoming =

- Unincorporated community
- Moose, Wyoming from US 189

- Location within the state of Wyoming Moose, Wyoming (the United States)
- Coordinates: 43°39′21″N 110°43′06″W
- Country: United States
- State: Wyoming
- County: Teton
- Time zone: UTC−7 (Mountain (MST))
  - Summer (DST): UTC−6 (MDT)
- ZIP codes: 83012
- GNIS feature ID: 1591745

Moose is an unincorporated community in Teton County, Wyoming, in the Jackson Hole valley. It has a US Post Office, with the zip code of 83012. The town is located within Grand Teton National Park along the banks of the Snake River.

The name Moose can also refer to the small community of Park Service houses located immediately behind administration offices. These houses are exclusively inhabited by Park Service employees and their families. The National Park Service maintains the Grand Teton National Park headquarters in Moose, as well as the park visitor center. A local non-profit, the Grand Teton Association, also maintains some facilities in the area to help further the NPS mission. Olaus and Margaret Murie and Olaus' brother Adolph lived in Moose for much of their lives. Today the Murie Ranch is administered by the Teton Science Schools. The Ranch was designated a National Historic Landmark in 2006.

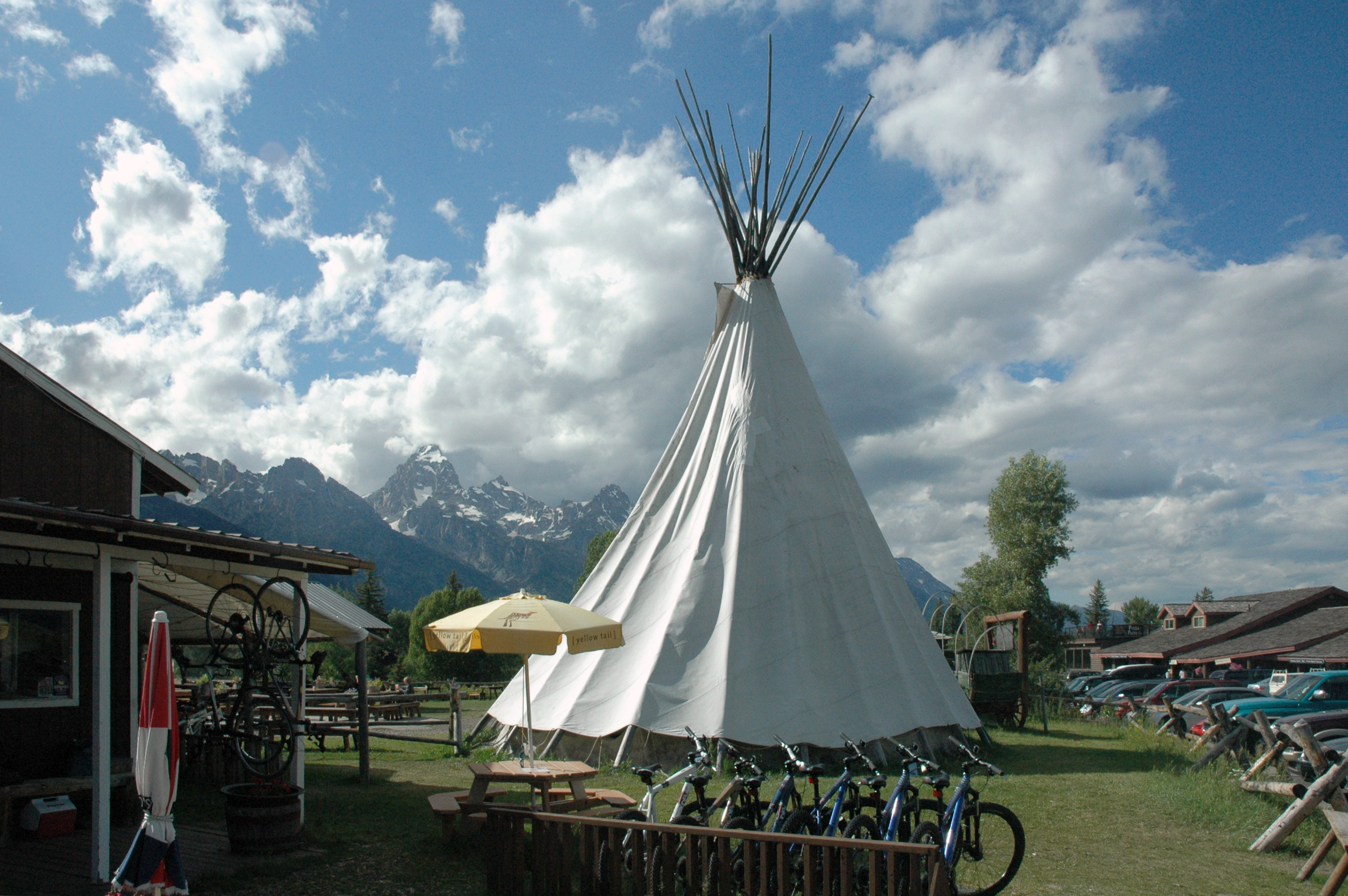
The commercial area of Dornans

The residents in Moose are counted as part of the Moose–Wilson Road census-designated place, but most of the residents live on the east side of the Snake River stretching as far south as Jackson Hole Airport, and as far north as Shadow Mountain. Most of the ranches and residences along the Moose–Wilson Road have been turned over to the national park, including John D. Rockefeller Jr.'s JY Ranch and the Murie Ranch. The commercial area in the community is centered mainly around the shops and restaurants of the Dornan family ranch inholding.

Given its central location in the Jackson Hole valley, Moose has been the setting for several motion pictures, including The Far Horizons in 1955.

== Climate ==
Climate data for Moose 1 NNE, Wyoming, 1991–2020 normals, 2004-2020 extremes: 6466ft (1971m)
Month	Jan	Feb	Mar	Apr	May	Jun	Jul	Aug	Sep	Oct	Nov	Dec	Year
Record high °F (°C)	44 (7)	48 (9)	60 (16)	75 (24)	82 (28)	89 (32)	92 (33)	92 (33)	90 (32)	80 (27)	62 (17)	47 (8)	92 (33)
Mean maximum °F (°C)	38.6 (3.7)	41.6 (5.3)	50.5 (10.3)	64.7 (18.2)	75.6 (24.2)	83.4 (28.6)	88.2 (31.2)	87.5 (30.8)	82.2 (27.9)	70.6 (21.4)	56.4 (13.6)	41.4 (5.2)	88.9 (31.6)
Mean daily maximum °F (°C)	23.8 (−4.6)	28.2 (−2.1)	37.7 (3.2)	47.1 (8.4)	59.7 (15.4)	68.9 (20.5)	79.2 (26.2)	78.2 (25.7)	68.1 (20.1)	52.8 (11.6)	36.1 (2.3)	24.8 (−4.0)	50.4 (10.2)
Daily mean °F (°C)	12.8 (−10.7)	17.4 (−8.1)	26.5 (−3.1)	35.4 (1.9)	45.7 (7.6)	53.0 (11.7)	61.0 (16.1)	59.3 (15.2)	51.4 (10.8)	38.9 (3.8)	25.5 (−3.6)	14.1 (−9.9)	36.8 (2.6)
Mean daily minimum °F (°C)	1.9 (−16.7)	6.6 (−14.1)	15.4 (−9.2)	23.8 (−4.6)	31.7 (−0.2)	37.1 (2.8)	42.8 (6.0)	40.5 (4.7)	34.7 (1.5)	25.1 (−3.8)	14.9 (−9.5)	3.4 (−15.9)	23.2 (−4.9)
Mean minimum °F (°C)	−22.3 (−30.2)	−17.8 (−27.7)	−7.4 (−21.9)	7.0 (−13.9)	19.3 (−7.1)	28.1 (−2.2)	34.5 (1.4)	31.1 (−0.5)	23.8 (−4.6)	10.6 (−11.9)	−6.1 (−21.2)	−20.9 (−29.4)	−27.0 (−32.8)
Record low °F (°C)	−32 (−36)	−33 (−36)	−23 (−31)	−7 (−22)	13 (−11)	24 (−4)	30 (−1)	25 (−4)	15 (−9)	−13 (−25)	−22 (−30)	−32 (−36)	−33 (−36)
Average precipitation inches (mm)	3.26 (83)	2.27 (58)	2.19 (56)	2.19 (56)	2.00 (51)	1.77 (45)	0.81 (21)	1.03 (26)	1.30 (33)	1.78 (45)	2.32 (59)	3.21 (82)	24.13 (615)
Source 1: NOAA
Source 2: XMACIS2 (records & 2004-2020 monthly max/mins)

Climate data for Moose, Wyoming (1981–2010)
Month	Jan	Feb	Mar	Apr	May	Jun	Jul	Aug	Sep	Oct	Nov	Dec	Year
Record high °F (°C)	50 (10)	55 (13)	63 (17)	78 (26)	88 (31)	92 (33)	97 (36)	97 (36)	88 (31)	83 (28)	67 (19)	53 (12)	97 (36)
Mean daily maximum °F (°C)	26.5 (−3.1)	31.2 (−0.4)	40.9 (4.9)	50.1 (10.1)	61.2 (16.2)	70.7 (21.5)	80.4 (26.9)	79.4 (26.3)	69.4 (20.8)	55.0 (12.8)	37.9 (3.3)	25.9 (−3.4)	52.4 (11.3)
Mean daily minimum °F (°C)	0.2 (−17.7)	2.3 (−16.5)	13.3 (−10.4)	22.6 (−5.2)	30.9 (−0.6)	37.3 (2.9)	41.7 (5.4)	39.9 (4.4)	32.2 (0.1)	23.1 (−4.9)	13.0 (−10.6)	1.1 (−17.2)	21.5 (−5.8)
Record low °F (°C)	−46 (−43)	−42 (−41)	−25 (−32)	−10 (−23)	7 (−14)	20 (−7)	26 (−3)	22 (−6)	6 (−14)	−3 (−19)	−22 (−30)	−43 (−42)	−46 (−43)
Average precipitation inches (mm)	2.45 (62)	1.90 (48)	1.49 (38)	1.47 (37)	1.98 (50)	1.66 (42)	1.27 (32)	1.20 (30)	1.47 (37)	1.47 (37)	2.27 (58)	2.57 (65)	21.20 (538)
Average snowfall inches (cm)	40.3 (102)	26.1 (66)	18.4 (47)	8.6 (22)	2.1 (5.3)	0.0 (0.0)	0.0 (0.0)	0.0 (0.0)	0.2 (0.51)	4.5 (11)	22.2 (56)	38.8 (99)	161.1 (409)
Source: NOAA

== Notable people ==
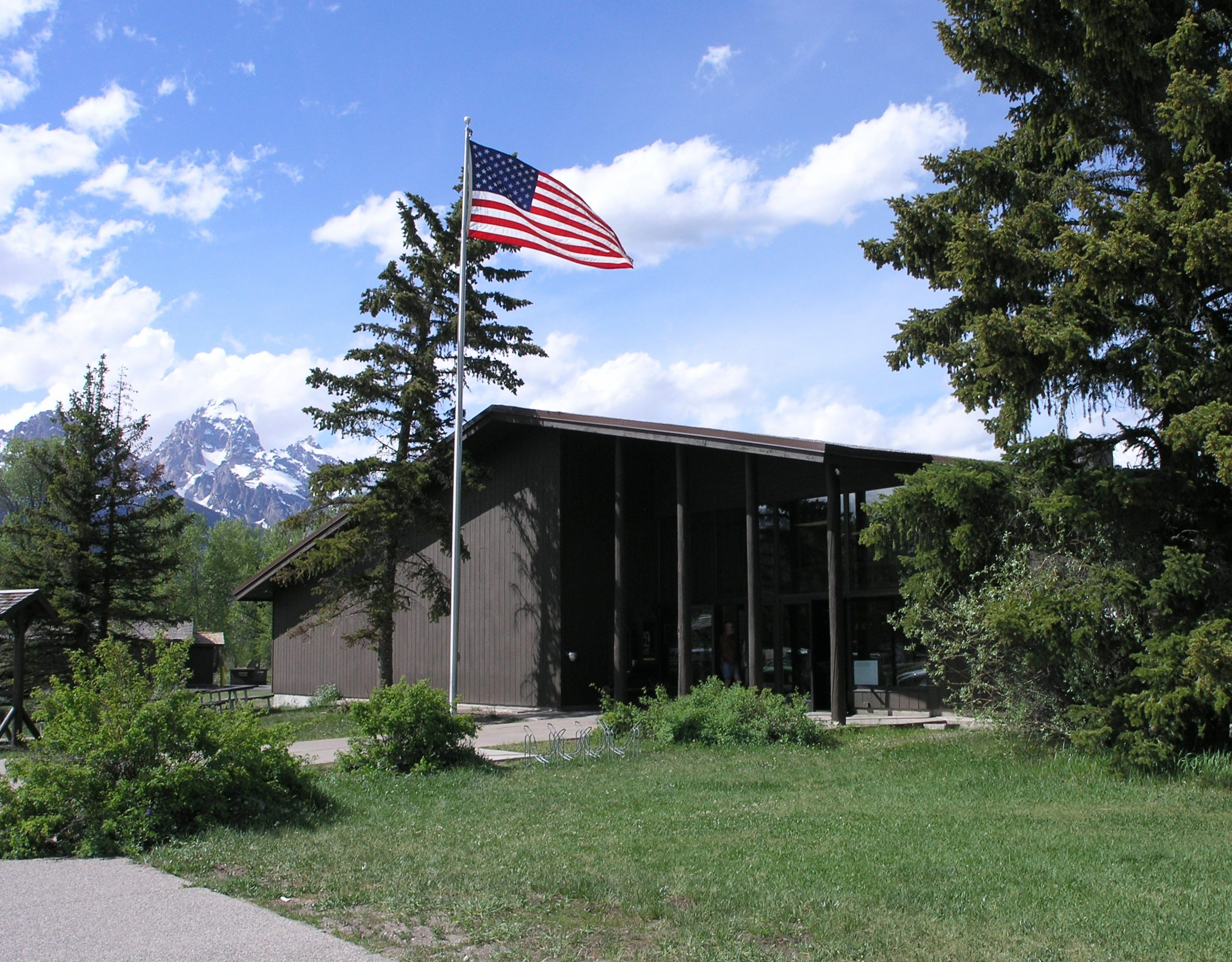
Grand Teton National Park headquarters

- Yvon Chouinard, American rock climber, environmentalist, and outdoor industry billionaire businessman. His company, Patagonia, is known for its environmental focus.
- Mario Gabelli, American stock investor, investment advisor, and financial analyst. He is the founder, chairman, and CEO of Gabelli Asset Management Company Investors (Gamco Investors), philanthropist.
- Cary Judd, singer, songwriter, author
- Thomas Mangelsen, Wildlife Photographer
- Margaret Murie, grandmother of the modern conservation movement, author of several books including Two in the Far North and Wapiti Wilderness. Along with husband Olaus, was instrumental in the designation of the Arctic National Wildlife Refuge as a protected area.
- Olaus Murie, environmentalist, biologist, and former head of the Wilderness Society. Played an instrumental role in the passage of the Wilderness Act and, along with his wife Mardy, in the designation of the Arctic National Wildlife Refuge as a protected area.
- John F. Turner, former U.S. Fish and Wildlife Service director.
- Terry Tempest Williams, American author, conservationist and activist.
