= Robert Muir =

Robert Muir may refer to:

- Robert Muir (pathologist) (1864–1959), Scottish pathologist
- Robert Muir (politician) (1919–2011), Canadian politician
- Robbie Muir (footballer) (born 1953), Australian rules footballer
- Bob Muir, American swimming coach in the International Swimming Hall of Fame
- Bob Muir (footballer) (1907–1973), Australian rules footballer
- Bob Muir (racing driver), Australian Bathurst 1000 race car driver
- Bobby Muir (1876–1953), Scottish footballer
- Robert Andrew Muir (1821–1904), Australian merchant and politician
- Robert Muir of Loanfoot (1758–1788), Scottish estate owner
