= Two in the Far North =

Book by Margaret Murie

Two in the Far North is a biographical novel written by Margaret Murie. Raised in Fairbanks, in the U.S. state of Alaska, and wife and companion of the biologist Olaus Murie, she tells the tale of their lives spent first living, then exploring and finally fighting for the preservation of the final wilderness frontiers of Alaska.

The book is divided into sections covering her childhood in the northernmost state (including the beginning of rail travel), her honeymoon in the unexplored wilds, later biological survey expeditions (with members including her husband and small baby) and finally her whirlwind trips back to Alaska from her home in Wyoming.
