= William Muir (disambiguation) =

William Muir (1819–1905) was a Scottish Orientalist and colonial administrator.

William Muir may also refer to:

- William Muir (coach) (1895–1967), American football, basketball, and baseball coach
- William Muir (cricketer) (1907–1964), Australian cricketer
- Willie Muir (1877–?), Scottish footballer
- William Muir (divine) (1787–1869), Scottish minister, Moderator of the General Assembly of the Church of Scotland in 1838
- William H. Muir (1902–1964), American sculptor
- William Muir (writer) (born 1967), British writer

== See also ==
- Bill Muir (born 1942), former American football coach
- Billy MacKinnon (William Muir MacKinnon, 1852–1942), Scottish footballer
- W. H. M. Lowe (William Henry Muir Lowe, 1861–1944), British Army officer
