= Upper Windy Creek Ranger Cabin No. 7 =

- U.S. National Register of Historic Places
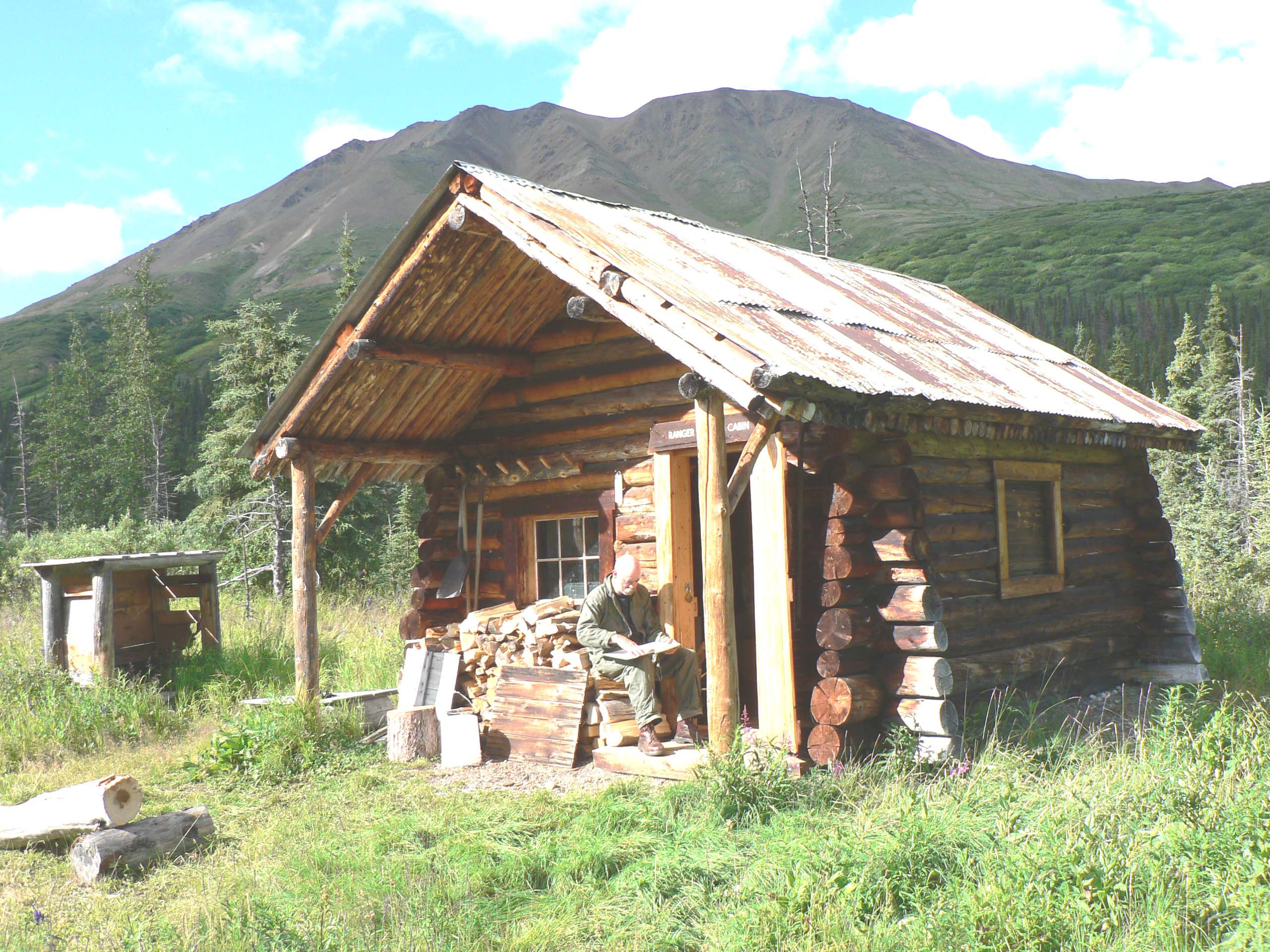

- Location within Alaska
- Location: 6 miles (9.7 km) west of Cantwell, south of Windy Creek, Denali National Park and Preserve, Alaska, U.S.
- Coordinates: 63°26′10″N 149°1′36″W
- Area: less than one acre
- Built: 1931
- Built by: National Park Service
- MPS: Patrol Cabins, Mount McKinley National Park TR
- NRHP reference No.: 86003219
- Added to NRHP: November 25, 1986

Upper Windy Creek Ranger Cabin No. 7, also known as the Upper Windy Patrol Cabin, is a log shelter in the National Park Service Rustic style in Denali National Park. The cabin is part of a network of shelters for patrolling park rangers throughout the park. It is a standard design by the National Park Service Branch of Plans and Designs and was built in 1931.
