= Muir (given name) =

Muir is a masculine given name. Notable people with the name include:

- Muir S. Fairchild (1894–1950), Vice Chief of Staff of the United States Air Force
- Muir Gray, British doctor and government official
- Muir Mathieson (1911–1975), British conductor and composer
- Muir Russell (born 1949), Scottish civil servant, Principal and Vice-Chancellor of the University of Glasgow
