= Muir College (disambiguation) =

Muir College is a public school for boys in South Africa.

Muir College may also refer to:

- Muir Central College, Allahabad, founded by Sir William Muir in 1866
- John Muir College, University of California, San Diego
