= Riley Creek Ranger Cabin No. 20 =

- U.S. National Register of Historic Places
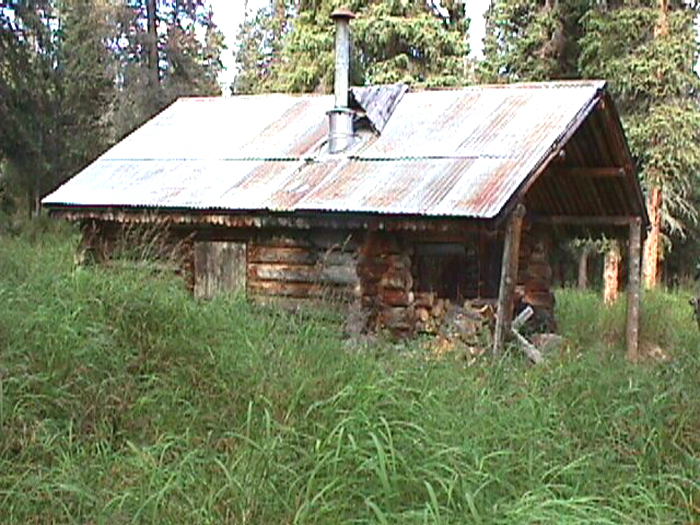

- Location within Alaska
- Location: 5 miles (8.0 km) cross-country and west of Mile 336 on Alaska RR, Denali National Park and Preserve, Alaska, U.S.
- Coordinates: 63°34′55″N 148°57′32″W
- Area: less than one acre
- Built: 1931
- Built by: National Park Service
- MPS: Patrol Cabins, Mount McKinley National Park TR
- NRHP reference No.: 86003225
- Added to NRHP: November 25, 1986

The Riley Creek Ranger Cabin No. 20, also known as Riley Creek Patrol Cabin, is a log shelter in the National Park Service Rustic style in Denali National Park. The cabin is part of a network of shelters for patrolling park rangers throughout the park. It is a standard design by the National Park Service Branch of Plans and Designs and was built in 1931.
