= Teklanika Archeological District =

Archaeological site in Alaska, United States

- U.S. National Register of Historic Places
- U.S. Historic district
- Alaska Heritage Resources Survey
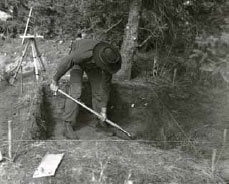
- Archaeologist Frederick West excavating at Teklanika, undated NPS photo
- Location: Address restricted, Denali Borough, Alaska, U.S.
- Area: 22 acres (8.9 ha)
- NRHP reference No.: 76000171
- AHRS No.: HEA-085
- Added to NRHP: January 31, 1976

The Teklanika Archeological District is a 22-acre (8.9 ha) collection of archeological sites located on a knoll overlooking the Teklanika River, that was listed on the U.S. National Register of Historic Places in 1976. It includes two contributing sites designated HEA-1 and HEA-2. It includes sites interpreted by archaeologists as a camp and an animal facility. The district was listed on the National Register for its potential to yield information in the future.

The site was discovered in 1960. It is a site where loess is deposited by wind, building up the terrain and burying campfire sites of early humans. Work in the 1960s and 1970s suggested that artifacts of the site were more than 10,000 years old, then later it was suggested that the site was less than 8,000 years old.

HEA-1, also known as Teklanika West, was studied in 2009 by archeologists Ben Potter and Sam Coffman, who found more than 1,500 artifacts, including remains of caribou, sheep, and bison which were useful in radiocarbon dating the site to be more than 10,000 years old after all.
