= Sushana River Ranger Cabin No. 17 =

- U.S. National Register of Historic Places
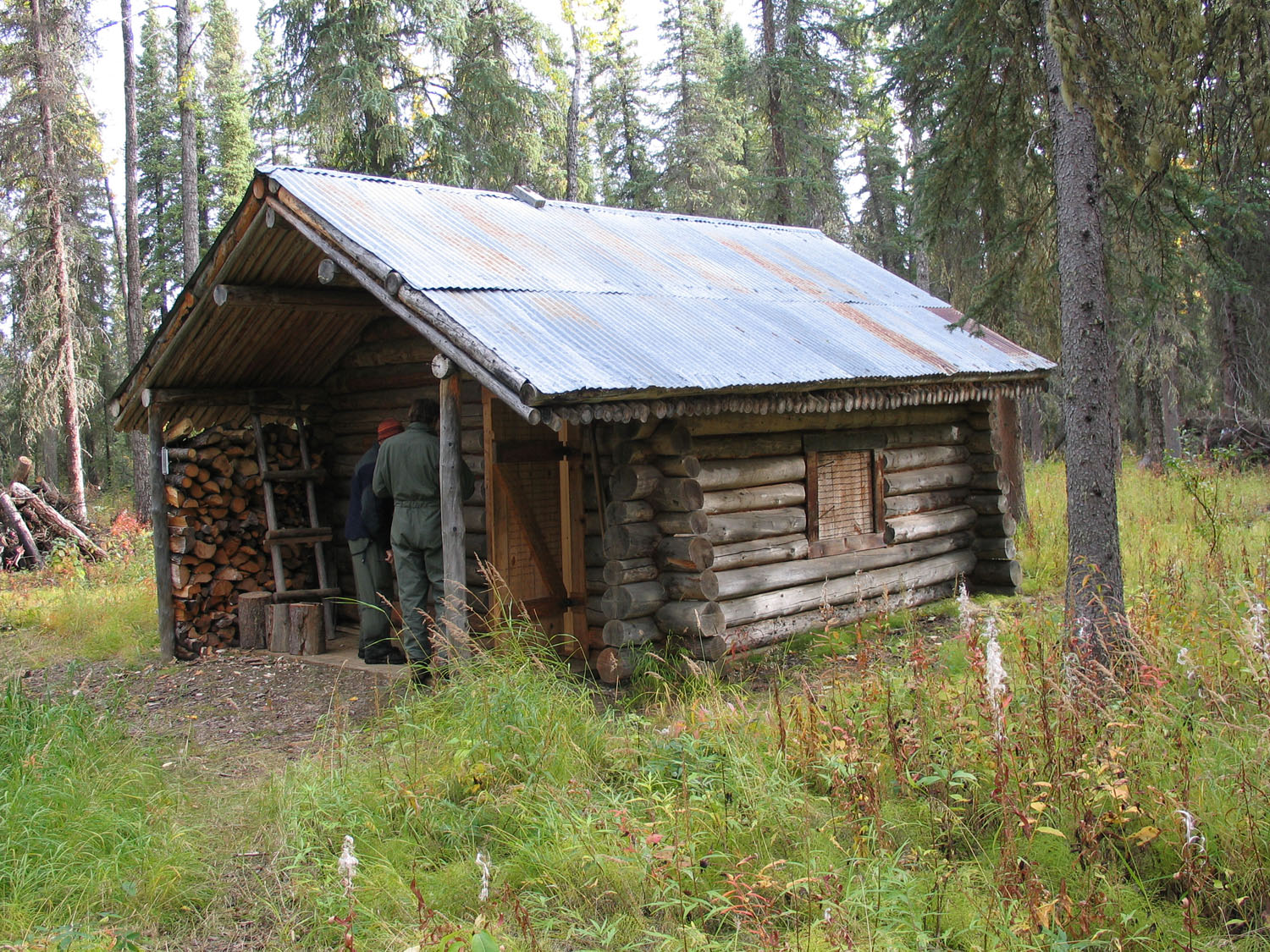

- Location within Alaska
- Location: 10 miles (16 km) cross-country and north of Mile 25 on Park Road, Denali National Park and Preserve, Alaska, U.S.
- Coordinates: 63°47′57″N 149°45′1″W
- Area: less than one acre
- Built: 1932
- Built by: National Park Service
- MPS: Patrol Cabins, Mount McKinley National Park TR
- NRHP reference No.: 86003227
- Added to NRHP: November 25, 1986

The Sushana Ranger Cabin No. 17, also known as the Sushana River Ranger Cabin and Sushana Patrol Cabin, is a log shelter in the National Park Service Rustic style in Denali National Park. The cabin is part of a network of shelters for patrolling park rangers throughout the park. It is a standard design by the National Park Service Branch of Plans and Designs and was built in 1932.
