= Margaret Murie =

American naturalist and author

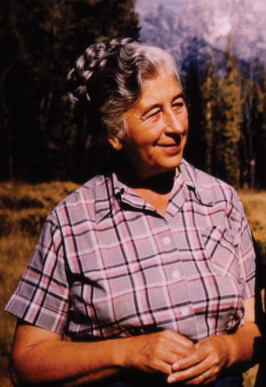
- Margret Murie at her home, Grand Teton National Park, 1953
- Born: Margaret Elizabeth Thomas; August 18, 1902; Seattle, Washington, U.S.
- Died: October 19, 2003 (aged 101); Moose, Wyoming, U.S.
- Occupations: Author, ecologist, and environmentalist
- Spouse: Olaus Murie
- Relatives: See Murie family article, people
- Writing career
- Pen name: Mardy Murie
- Genre: Memoir
- Subjects: Conservation, wilderness preservation
- Notable works: Two in the Far North, Wapiti Wilderness
- Notable awards: Presidential Medal of Freedom

Margaret Elizabeth Thomas "Mardy" Murie (August 18, 1902 – October 19, 2003) was an American naturalist, writer, adventurer, and conservationist. Dubbed the "Grandmother of the Conservation Movement" by both the Sierra Club and the Wilderness Society, she helped in the passage of the Wilderness Act, and was instrumental in creating the Arctic National Wildlife Refuge. She was the recipient of the Audubon Medal, the John Muir Award, and the Presidential Medal of Freedom—the highest civilian honor awarded by the United States.

== Early life ==
Born Margaret Elizabeth Thomas on August 18, 1902 in Seattle, Washington, Murie moved to Fairbanks, Alaska, with her family when she was nine years old. She attended Reed College in Oregon for two years before transferring to Simmons College in Massachusetts for a year, then transferred to and became the first woman to graduate from the Alaska Agricultural College and School of Mines (now the University of Alaska Fairbanks); she graduated in 1924 with a degree in business administration. She met Olaus Murie in Fairbanks, and they married in 1924 at sunrise in Anvik, Alaska.

From 1927 onward, the Muries were residents of Jackson, Wyoming, where Olaus studied ecology, specifically the elk population. Mardy worked side-by-side with Olaus in the field, studying elk, sheep and numerous other animals in the Greater Yellowstone Ecosystem. The couple would camp for weeks at a time in the wild, open valley of Jackson Hole. Olaus' primary goal was to identify pressures on the elk population, hoping to discern what was causing the startling population decrease in the area. Over the course of nearly 40 years, the couple had numerous backcountry expeditions tracking the wildlife in the area. The couple even took expeditions when their three children were still nursing.

After World War II, they chose to buy a dude ranch after Mardy decided she no longer wanted to live in town; she wanted to walk out her back door and into the woods. The Murie Ranch became a hub for conversations and problem solving to protect the wild. Olaus and Mardy took on work as director and secretary of the Wilderness Society, helping draft recommendations for legislation and policy like the protection of Jackson Hole National Monument. After Olaus died, Mardy traveled to Alaska, Tanzania, and New Zealand studying wild areas, assessing areas for wilderness qualities and working to protect nature from exploitation.

== Books and articles ==
- Two in the Far North, a memoir published in 1962, chronicles Murie's early life, her marriage, and research expeditions in Alaska.
- Island Between, published in 1977. ISBN 0-912006-04-8
- Wapiti Wilderness, published in 1966 with her husband. ISBN 0-87081-155-X

== Work as a wilderness advocate, advisor and consultant ==
Mardy and Olaus spent their honeymoon studying birds and traveling over 500 miles by dogsled, conducting research on the caribou of the Brooks Range. Margaret's idea of preserving an entire ecosystem laid the scientific and intellectual groundwork for large parks and preserves. In 1956, Murie began a campaign with her husband to protect what is now the Arctic National Wildlife Refuge. The couple recruited U.S. Supreme Court Justice William O. Douglas to help persuade President Dwight Eisenhower to set aside 8,000,000 acres (32,000 km^{2}) as the Arctic National Wildlife Range, which was expended and renamed in 1980 by President Jimmy Carter.

After her husband's death in 1963, Murie began writing and continued the conservation work she and Olaus had begun, writing letters and articles, traveling to hearings and making speeches. She served as a consultant to the Wilderness Society, the National Park Service and the Sierra Club, among many other organizations. Murie returned to Alaska to survey potential wilderness areas for the National Park Service and worked on the Alaska National Interest Lands Conservation Act, testifying before congress in favor of the act, which was signed by President Carter in 1980. That legislation set aside 104,000,000 acres (420,000 km^{2}) of land in Alaska and doubled the size of the Arctic National Wildlife Refuge. The Murie Residence in Moose, Wyoming, was added to the National Register of Historic Places in 1990, and as part of the Murie Ranch Historic District was designated a National Historic Landmark in 2006. It now houses a conservation institute named for Murie and her husband.

Murie died in Moose, Wyoming, on October 19, 2003, at the age of 101.

== Awards ==
Murie received the Audubon Medal in 1980, the John Muir Award in 1983, and the Robert Marshall Conservation Award in 1986. She was made an honorary park ranger by the National Park Service, and received an honorary Doctor of Humane Letters from the University of Alaska.

In 1998 President Clinton awarded her the Presidential Medal of Freedom.

Just prior to her 100th birthday in 2002, Murie received the J.N. Ding Darling Conservationist of the Year Award, the National Wildlife Federation's highest honor.

A documentary (1999), and a book (2001), Arctic Dance, was made about her life.

== See also ==
- Mount Margaret (Alaska)
