= Five Times August =

American alternative musician

Brad Skistimas
- Born: August 5, 1983 (age 43); Dallas, Texas, U.S.
- Occupations: Singer-songwriter, musician
- Instruments: Vocals, guitar, piano
- Years active: 2001–present
- Website: fivetimesaugust.com

Brad Skistimas (born August 5, 1983), known professionally as Five Times August, is an American singer-songwriter and independent musician. He also known as the founder of the children's music brand The Juicebox Jukebox.

== Career ==
Brad Skistimas began recording music under the name Five Times August in 2001 at the age of 18. His first self-produced albums, Say (2001), Hover (2003), and Audience of Zero (2003), were sold locally in Dallas coffee shops and shows. In 2004, Five Times August collaborated with songwriter Chris Hawkes to release the EP Something Clever. The track "Better With You" was licensed by MTV and appeared in the first season of Laguna Beach: The Real Orange County.

In 2005, Five Times August released the full-length album Fry Street. All songs from the album were licensed for MTV's Laguna Beach and later appeared in other series including The Real World, One Tree Hill, and Degrassi. By 2007, Five Times August had developed a significant audience on Myspace, reportedly receiving more than five million profile views. That same year, the album was reissued as The Independent and distributed in Walmart stores through Anderson Merchandising, despite being unsigned.

In 2008, Five Times August released Brighter Side, produced by Todd and Toby Pipes of Deep Blue Something. He later used online crowdfunding to fund Life as a Song (2009), re-recorded with Grammy-winning producer Andy Zulla, which raised $20,000 in 31 days. In 2010, it was reported that Five Times August had 70 songs in film, commercials, and television including CBS, ABC, HBO, FOX, MTV, The CW, Oxygen and Lifetime, without a licensing company. In 2013, Five Times August released the side project Where Did I Go? under the name *Bradley James*, produced by Rob Arthur. The EP incorporated influences like Nat King Cole and Sam Cooke.

In 2018, Five Times August launched The Juicebox Jukebox, a children's music and educational brand. The debut album Now Hear This! was released in 2020 and its animated videos have gained more than 35 million views on YouTube. The project was added to the Texas Commission on the Arts Touring Roster in 2019 and provides music for Star Spangled Adventures, a U.S. history animated series part of Dr. Ben Carson's Little Patriots curriculum.

In 2021, Five Times August released a series of politically themed singles, including the song “Sad Little Man” criticizing Anthony Fauci. These singles were compiled into the 2022 album Silent War, which reached #5 on Amazon's overall albums chart and #1 on Apple Music's alternative and singer-songwriter charts. Five Times August performed protest songs at the Defeat the Mandates rallies at the Lincoln Memorial in Washington, D.C., and in Los Angeles, in 2022. In 2023, Five Times August released the single "Ain’t No Rock and Roll" with Nashville songwriter Chris Wallin, featuring musicians Pete Parada, Ira Dean, Tom Bukovac, and Jim “Moose” Brown. In 2024, he collaborated with Smash Mouth's guitarist Greg Camp on the singles "Liars, Cheats, and Crooks" and "Counterfeit World."
