= Muir Elementary School =

Muir Elementary School may refer to the following:

- Muir Elementary School in Antioch, California
- John Muir Elementary School in Berkeley, California
- John Muir Elementary School in Cupertino, California
- Muir Elementary School in Fresno, California
- John Muir Elementary School in Glendale, California
- John Muir Elementary School in Lodi, California
- John Muir Elementary School in Martinez, California
- John Muir Elementary School in Merced, California
- John Muir Elementary School in Modesto, California
- John Muir Elementary School in San Bruno, California
- John Muir Elementary School in San Francisco, California
- John Muir Fundamental Elementary School in Santa Ana, California
- John Muir Elementary School in Santa Monica, California
- John Muir Elementary School in Hoffman Estates, Illinois
- John Muir Elementary School in Parma, Ohio
- John Muir Elementary School in Ashland, Oregon
- Nellie Muir Elementary School in Woodburn, Oregon
- Leo J. Muir Elementary School in Bountiful, Utah
- Muir Elementary School in Madison, Wisconsin
- Muir Elementary School in Portage, Wisconsin
