= David S. Muir =

David muir family

- Born: 4 January 1971 (age 55); Falkirk, United Kingdom
- Education: University of Glasgow
- Known for: Director of Political Strategy for Gordon Brown

David S. Muir (born 4 January 1971) is a Scottish marketing and political communications professional. He was Director of Political Strategy for British prime minister Gordon Brown between 2008 and 2010.

== Biography ==
Muir was born in Falkirk and attended his local comprehensive Falkirk High School. In 1988 attended the University of Glasgow. In 1992 he graduated with a MA Hons 1st Class in Politics and Economics. He also won the Alistair Reid Prize for Politics for the outstanding study of politics and an ESU Scholarship to work with the US politician Byron Dorgan. He later graduated from London Business School with a Master of Business Administration.

== Career ==
In 1992 Muir joined the advertising agency Ogilvy & Mather, becoming New Business Director until taking a leave of absence to complete his MBA in 1999. In 2001 he returned to Ogilvy where he focussed on expanding the group through organic growth and acquisitions. In 2003 he wrote with Jon Miller The Business of Brands, looking at how businesses could nurture and value their brands.

In 2005 he moved over to WPP to take over "The Channel" from Mandy Pooler. There he helped develop WPP's research tool Brandz where he developed the BrandZ Top 100. While at The Channel he also developed Sportz which allows global brands to evaluate sponsorship opportunities.

=== Downing Street ===
In 2008 Muir left WPP to become the British prime minister, Gordon Brown's, Director of Political Strategy, replacing Spencer Livermore who had left At Downing Street Muir was the Prime Ministers leading political adviser after Stephen Carter left. He along with Kirsty McNeill developed Brown's "No time for a novice speech" at the 2008 Labour Party Conference which was "warmly received".

Muir worked closely with Peter Mandelson and Philip Gould on the Labour Party's 2010 general election campaign. He was the lead negotiator of the historic British TV Election Debates and was an early proponent of them.

He is believed to have argued for a hard edged attack on the Conservatives and their threat to middle income earners. In particular he pushed for the campaign to focus on the threat the Conservative's posed to child tax credits. It is also believed that he supported Gordon Brown's decision not to serve a full term.

The campaign denied the Conservatives an overall majority and Muir was part of small team that spent the next five days in discussions with the Liberal Democrats. Muir left Downing Street when Gordon Brown resigned in May 2010.
