= Kenneth Muir =

Kenneth Muir may refer to:

- Kenneth Muir (British Army officer) (1912–1950), British recipient of the Victoria Cross
- Kenneth Hart Muir (1916–1942), United States Navy officer
- Kenneth Muir (scholar) (1907–1996), English literary scholar and author
- Kenneth Muir (Neighbours), a fictional character on the Australian soap opera Neighbours
