= John Muir Award =

John Muir Award may refer to:

- Sierra Club John Muir Award
- John Muir Award, a film award of the National Educational Film Festival, won in 1977 by Dan Gibson
- John Muir Lifetime Achievement Award, an award of the John Muir Trust
