= Walter Muir (soccer) =

Scottish former footballer (born 1953)

Personal information
- Date of birth: 1 December 1953 (age 72)
- Place of birth: Tranent, Scotland
- Position: Forward

Senior career*
Years	Team	Apps	(Gls)
1968	Toronto Celtic		
1969	Toronto Irish		
1970	Toronto Celtic		
1971–1973	Toronto Metros	29	(7)
1973	Toronto First Portuguese		
- * Club domestic league appearances and goals

Walter Muir (born 1 December 1953) is a Scottish former footballer who played as a forward.

== Career ==
Muir played in the Toronto & District Soccer League in 1968 with Toronto Celtic. In 1969, he played with Toronto Irish, and assisted in securing the First Division title. The following season he returned to Toronto Celtic and won the Consols Cup by defeating Toronto Emerald. In 1971, he played in the North American Soccer League with the Toronto Metros. In his debut season he appeared in 20 matches and recorded five goals. He re-signed with Toronto for the 1972 season.

In 1973, he signed for another season with the Metros. For the remainder of the 1973 season he played in the National Soccer League with Toronto First Portuguese.
