= Lower Windy Creek Ranger Cabin No. 15 =

- U.S. National Register of Historic Places
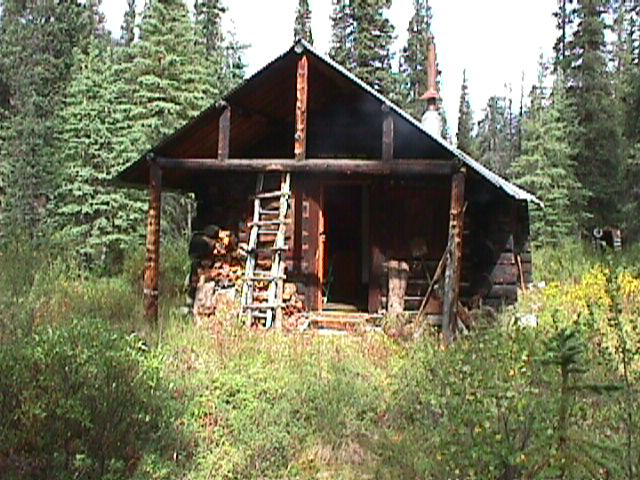
- Lower Windy Creek Ranger Cabin

- Location within Alaska
- Location: East of Mile 324 on Alaska Railroad, Denali National Park & Preserve, Alaska
- Coordinates: 63°26′23″N 148°53′9″W
- Area: less than one acre
- Built: 1932
- Built by: National Park Service
- Architectural style: Log cabins
- MPS: Patrol Cabins, Mount McKinley National Park TR
- NRHP reference No.: 86003229
- Added to NRHP: November 25, 1986

The Lower Windy Creek Ranger Cabin No. 15, also known as Lower Windy Creek Patrol Cabin and Lower Windy Shelter Cabin, is a historic backcountry shelter in the Denali National Park and Preserve, in Alaska. It is built out of peeled logs, sealed with oakum and concrete chinking. It has a medium-pitch gable roof of corrugated metal and shiplap. The site includes seven log shelters for dogs, located about 70 feet (21 m) north of the cabin. The cabin is located about 500 feet east of Mile 324 on the Alaska Railroad.

It is a standard design by the National Park Service and was built in 1932. Shortly after its construction, a complex of separate log dog kennels, a log cache and an outhouse were added, also to a standard Park Service design.

The cabin was listed on the National Register of Historic Places in 1986.
