= Murie Ranch Historic District =

Historic district in Wyoming, United States

- U.S. National Register of Historic Places
- U.S. National Historic Landmark District
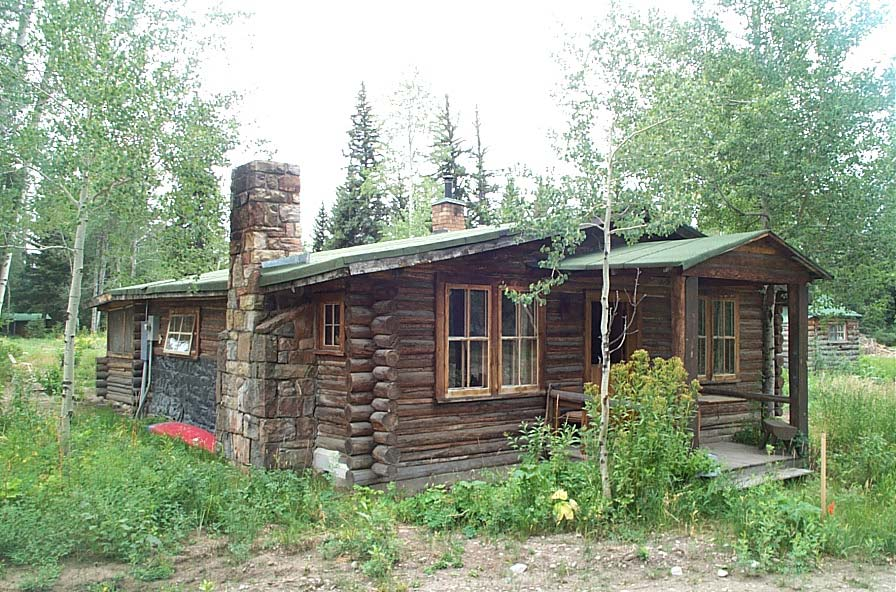
- Estes Cabin, Murie Ranch

- Location within Wyoming Location within the United States
- Location: Grand Teton National Park, Teton County, Wyoming, USA
- Nearest city: Moose, Wyoming
- Coordinates: 43°39′1.3″N 110°43′46.052″W
- Built: 1951
- Architect: Estes, Buster
- MPS: Grand Teton National Park MPS
- NRHP reference No.: 98001039

Significant dates
- Added to NRHP: August 24, 1998
- Designated NHLD: February 17, 2006

The Murie Ranch Historic District, also known as the STS Dude Ranch and Stella Woodbury Summer Home, is an inholding in Grand Teton National Park near Moose, Wyoming. The district is chiefly significant for its association with the conservationists Olaus Murie, his wife Margaret (Mardy) Murie and scientist Adolph Murie and his wife Louise. Olaus and Adolph Murie were influential in the establishment of an ecological approach to wildlife management, while Mardy Murie was influential because of her huge conservation victories such as passing the Alaska National Interest Lands Conservation Act of 1980 and being awarded with the highest civilian honor, the Presidential Medal of Freedom, for her lifetime works in conservation. Olaus Murie was a prominent early field biologist in the U.S. Biological Survey and subsequent U.S. Fish and Wildlife Service before retiring and becoming the president of the Wilderness Society, He was a prominent advocate for the preservation of wild lands in America.

The Murie Residence, home of Olaus and Mardy, and itself listed on the National Register of Historic Places in 1990, adjoins the former STS Dude Ranch. Both the Murie Residence and the STS Ranch provided accommodation for meetings of the Wilderness Society in 1953, and provided a base for writers and activists in the 1940s, 50s and 60s.

== The Muries ==
Olaus Murie was responsible for landmark studies on caribou and their relationship to the environment in Alaska during the 1920s while working for the U.S. Bureau of Biological Survey. Along with Aldo Leopold and others, he was a prominent early voice for ecological thought in the United States. He was joined by his younger brother Adolph in 1922, and met his future wife, Margaret "Mardy" Thomas in Fairbanks in 1924. Adolph later married Mardy's half sister Louise. Olaus undertook a study of the elk population in Jackson Hole in 1927, controversially concluding that the artificially-managed elk herd exceeded the carrying capacity of the range because of the managed feeding. The study was a landmark in the development of a holistic view of ecosystems and their inhabitants. From 1937 to 1940, Adolph studied coyotes in Yellowstone National Park, publishing a report that contradicted the existing policies on predator control, leading to reversal of National Park Service policies that encouraged the elimination of coyotes in the park. Adolph continued his studies of predators, publishing The Wolves of Mount McKinley in 1944, which resulted in a similar reversal of Park Service wolf control policies in Alaska.

Olaus and Mardy Murie moved to Jackson in 1927, living in a now-vanished house that they called "Pumpkin House." Adolph and Louise moved to Jackson in 1939. At the time of the park's expansion with the creation of Jackson Hole National Monument, Olaus was at the time on the board of directors of the Wilderness Society. Olaus was also on the board of Jackson Hole Preserve, Inc., which administered the properties purchased by the Snake River Land Company for eventual incorporation into an expanded Grand Teton National Park. When the Preserve acted on a proposal to create a fenced wildlife park in Jackson Hole, Murie resigned, prompting the National Park Service to disassociate itself from the venture, which proved short-lived. In 1945, Olaus Murie left government employment and became president of the Wilderness Society, at the same time moving to the STS property. The ranch was the venue for the 1948 Wilderness Society Council. The ranch also hosted a number of prominent visitors, including grizzly bear biologists John and Frank Craighead during their early careers; John Turner, who would become Director of the U.S. Fish and Wildlife Service; and U.S. Supreme Court justice William O. Douglas. Olaus' publications written at the ranch include The Elk of North America and A Field Guide to Animal Tracks. Adolph wrote The Grizzlies of North America, The Wolves of Mount McKinley and A Naturalist in Alaska. Mardy Murie wrote Two in the Far North and with her husband Olaus wrote Wapiti Wilderness, essays on Jackson Hole and life at the ranch. Olaus Murie was also a fine artist. Olaus and Margaret Murie's expedition in 1956 to the Sheenjek River, on the south slope of the Brooks Range, was a key event in the eventual protection of the Arctic National Wildlife Refuge. The Wilderness Act was passed a year after Olaus Murie's death which preserved 10 million acres of land in Alaska and today has preserved 100 million acres of land in Alaska as well as impacting other parts of the United States. After the death of Olaus in 1963, Mardy Murie joined the Society's governing council and continued Olaus' work, still living at the ranch.

Mardy decided to honor her husband by working to preserve the nature which they both loved. In 1980, sixteen years after her husband Olaus died at 73 years old, Mardy Murie helped pass the Alaska National Interest Lands Conservation Act which saved one hundred million acres in Alaska. This helped her unite everybody that she talked to as she tried to conserve nature. She had the ability and the humility to reach across generations, careers, power levels and positions. Mardy lived to be 101 years old and in the course of her life was recognized by four presidents. John Denver wrote a song about her entitled, 'A Song for All Lovers' about Mardy Murie and Olaus Murie waltzing in the Arctic wilderness.

== STS Ranch ==
The STS was established by Buster and Frances Estes (née Mears) near Menor's Ferry in 1921 as a dude ranch. Buster was a local, while Frances first came to Jackson Hole from Philadelphia to visit the Bar B C Dude Ranch in 1914. Mears and Estes fell in love, marrying over the objections of Mears' family. In 1922 the Estes heard from Holiday Menor that 76 acres (31 ha) were available just down the river from Menor's Ferry on the west side of the river. The Estes built a cabin and moved in in January, 1923. The dude ranch started small, with a single guest cabin and one tent. By 1927 the STS featured a log cabin, two frame cabins, a barn, a garage, and the five-room main house. The Estes gradually expanded to a capacity of 24 dudes, charging $55 per week, less than the $70 or more charged by the White Grass or Bar B C. The ranch flourished for a while, but was badly affected by the Great Depression. Rates went down, and a portion of the property was leased to the Nelson brothers, who built what is now the Murie residence. Buster and Frances built a new log house in 1940, but closed the ranch during World War II and worked in war production in Salt Lake City. The STS was purchased by the Muries (Adolph and Louise, and Olaus and Mardy) in 1946, with Adolph and Louise living in the original ranch buildings, Olaus and Mardie living in the Nelson house after 1950. The sale to the Muries was contingent on the Muries never operating the place as a dude ranch.

== Murie Ranch ==
The Murie property amounted to 77 acres (31 ha) next to the village of Moose. Olaus immediately removed the property's fences. The Nelson house was purchased in 1950 and occupied by Olaus and Mardy. The Muries partially dammed an offshoot of the Snake to use as a swimming hole, the work completed by beavers. Olaus wrote about the ranch and its wildlife in his book Jackson Hole with a Naturalist.

Principal structures include:

- The Studio: A one-story log building built in 1947 with one room and a front porch, used by Olaus Murie as a painting and drawing studio.
- Homestead Cabin/STS Lodge: The original Estes homestead, built in 1925, the Homestead Cabin was the principal building of the STS Ranch. It was expanded gradually, evolving from a square to a T-shaped plan with additions for a lounge, dining room and library. The homestead's doors are notably short, since Buster Estes was short and adapted the doors to his dimensions.
- Murie Residence: Formerly the Woodbury Residence, the one story log house was built in 1942 with views of Grand Teton from within. The original house comprises eight rooms, with another room in a 1950s addition.
- Chena Cabin: A one-story log building with three rooms.
- Estes Cabin: The home of Buster and Frances Estes after they made their homestead cabin into the STS Lodge, the Estes Cabin was moved to the site from an unknown location in Jackson. It was originally built about 1925. After the Muries purchased the ranch, it was occupied by Inger Koedt.
- Robin's Nest Cabin: Located next to the Estes Cabin, the single-room cabin was built about 1925. The Estes used it as a bedroom for their daughter, while Inger Koedt used it as a guesthouse.
- Moviewood Cabin: The wood-frame cabin was built about 1925, and was used as an office and cutting room for a documentary on Mardy Murie entitled Arctic Dance: The Mardy Murie Story. It is now an office for the Murie Foundation.
- Alatna Dulex Cabin: The Alatna was built about 1925 as a one-story, two-room log cabin with a communicating door between rooms, each of which has a separate exterior door.
- Cabin Belvedere: A one-room 1925 log cabin.
- Cabin Polaris: Similar to Belvedere, the cabin was once thought to be Adolph Murie's study, an idea now discredited.
- Montana Duplex Cabin: Divided into two equal rooms, the 1925 Montana cabin was used as two guest units, with no interior door.
- Wild Lone Cabin: Located at a distance from the main complex, the Wild Lone cabin was built about 1925 as a one-room log cabin.

Most of the cabins have an associated outhouse. The complex also includes a number of garages, sheds and utility buildings. A barn and storage shed were removed from the site and taken elsewhere in the 1970s.

The properties were declared a National Historic Landmark in 2006.

== See also ==
- Historical buildings and structures of Grand Teton National Park
