= Sanctuary River Cabin No. 31 =

- U.S. National Register of Historic Places
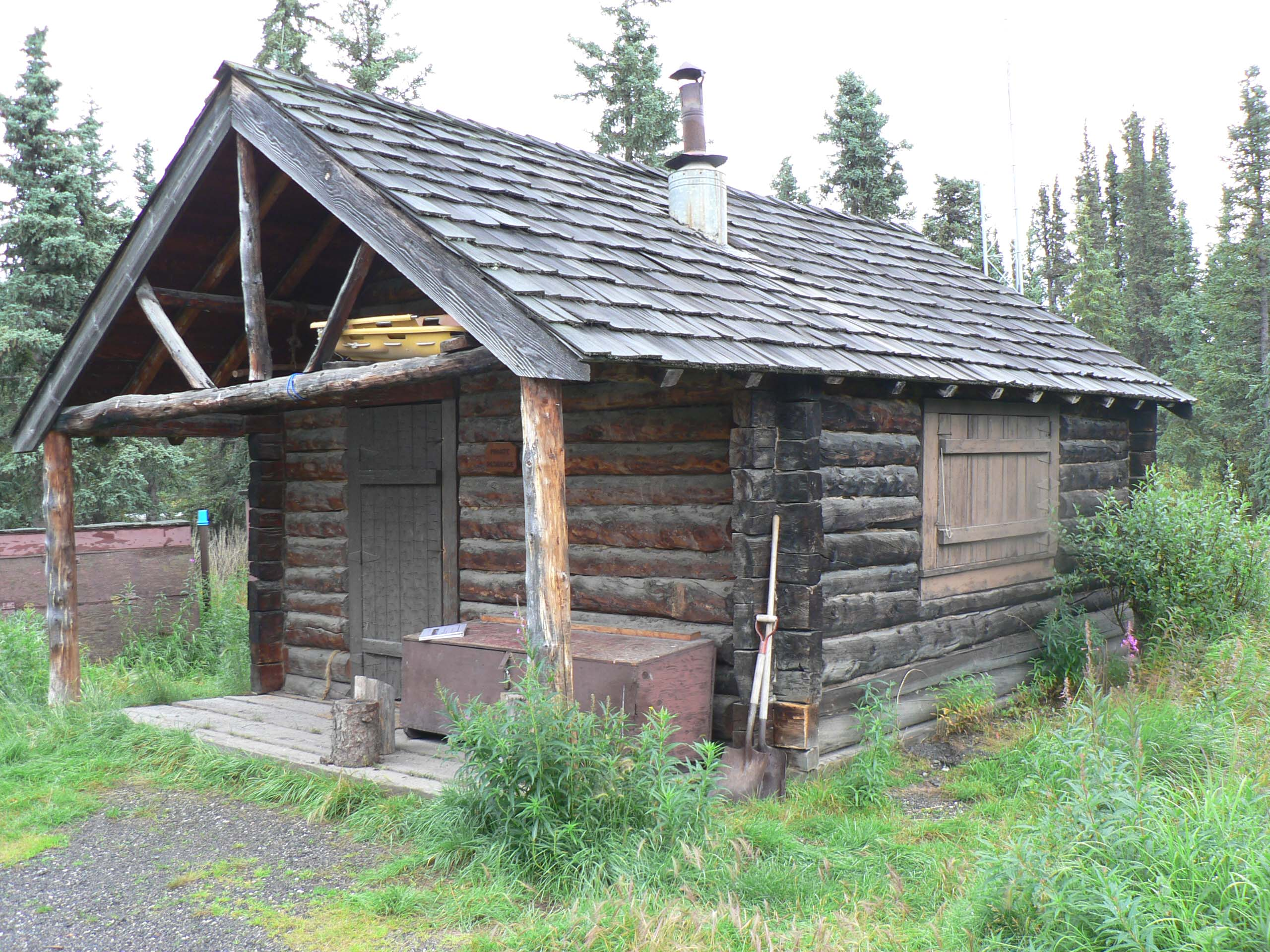

- Location within Alaska
- Location: On Sanctuary River at Mile 22.7, south of Park Road, Denali National Park & Preserve, Alaska
- Coordinates: 63°43′22″N 149°28′24″W
- Area: less than one acre
- Built: 1926
- Built by: Alaska Road Commission; National Park Service
- Architectural style: Log cabin
- MPS: Patrol Cabins, Mount McKinley National Park TR
- NRHP reference No.: 86003206
- Added to NRHP: November 25, 1986

The Sanctuary River Cabin No. 31, also known as Sanctuary Patrol Cabin, is a log cabin that was listed on the National Register of Historic Places in 1986. The listing includes an outhouse and a tool box and storage shed.

It was built by the Alaska Road Commission in 1926 as the center of a road construction camp, and was adopted by park rangers in wintertime dog sled patrols as a replacement for a different cabin located about five miles south.

This was the cabin where Adolph Murie "began his field work investigating the wolf-Dall sheep relationship in the park...in the summer of 1939."
