= Muir House =

Muir House may refer to:

in the United States (by state then city)

- John Muir National Historic Site, Martinez, California, a National Historic Landmark and listed on the National Register of Historic Places (NRHP) in Contra Costa County
- Muir House (Nicholasville, Kentucky), NRHP-listed in Jessamine County
- Muir House (Shelbyville, Kentucky), NRHP-listed in Shelby County
- David Muir House, Beaver, Utah, NRHP-listed in Beaver County
- Muir House (Mendon, Utah), NRHP-listed in Cache County
