= Muir Middle School =

Muir Middle School / John Muir Middle School, a common name for a number of schools

Muir Middle School may refer to:

- Muir Middle School (Milford, Michigan), school in Huron Valley School District

John Muir Middle School may refer to any of the following schools in the United States:

- John Muir Middle School (Burbank, California)
- John Muir Middle School (Corcoran, California), school in Corcoran, California
- John Muir Middle School (Los Angeles), school in LA's Promise system of schools (formerly known as MLA Partner Schools)
- John Muir Middle School (San Jose, California), school in San Jose Unified School District
- John Muir Middle School (San Leandro, California), school in San Leandro Unified School District
- John Muir Middle School (Milwaukee, Wisconsin), part of the Milwaukee Public Schools
- John Muir Middle School (Wausau, Wisconsin), part of the Wausau School District
