= Bobby Muir =

Scottish footballer

Personal information
- Full name: Robert Bryce Muir
- Date of birth: 23 September 1876
- Place of birth: Kilmarnock, Scotland
- Date of death: 1953 (aged 76–77)
- Position: Outside right

Senior career*
Years	Team	Apps	(Gls)
1895–1896	Kilmarnock Deanpark		
1896–1897	Clyde	7	(2)
1897–1901	Kilmarnock	62	(16)
1901–1903	Bristol Rovers	46	(6)
1903–1904	Celtic	20	(4)
1904–1905	Notts County	19	(0)
1905–1907	Norwich City		
1907–1912	Galston		
1912	Toronto Eatonia		
Total		154	(28)
- * Club domestic league appearances and goals

Robert Bryce Muir (23 September 1876 – 1953) was a Scottish footballer who played in the Football League for Notts County.
