= Jackson Hole National Monument =

This map shows the boundaries of the Jackson Hole National Monument in 1943 and how it related to the existing Grand Teton National Park.

On March 15, 1943, Franklin D. Roosevelt signed Presidential Proclamation 2578 establishing a large swath of land east of the Teton National Park as a national monument. The area of land covered 221,610 acres (89,680 ha). The majority of the land was National Forest, but 32,117 acres (12,997 ha) of the monument were donated by John D. Rockefeller, Jr., and 17,000 acres (6,900 ha) were privately owned ranches. This proclamation incited a controversy in Teton County, Wyoming that caused immediate pushback from western congressmen who saw the act as a violation of state sovereignty.

== Background ==
Within Teton County, private interests regularly fought for their right to use natural resources available to them which worried conservationist parties and started a chain of reform within the forest service to better police grazing conditions in the Yellowstone area reserve.

In 1927, conservationist and later director of the National Park Service Horace Albright, helped to convince John D. Rockefeller, Jr. that the area needed protection. After his visit to the area in 1924, Rockefeller, Jr. purchased several ranches totaling 37,117 acres (15,021 ha). He bought the land through the Snake River Cattle and Stock Company also known as the Snake River Land Company with the intention of donating the land to the government for a national park. Rockefeller was instrumental to the creation of the original park, since the Snake River Land Company controlled and managed the land until the National Park Service could find a way to include it into the park. The original 1929 plan for the Grand Teton National Park included Jackson Hole Lake and the surrounding valley but after an initial survey and pushback from ranchers in Teton county, the borders were shrunk to include only the Teton Range and six glacial lakes. Plans to expand the park began directly after its initial establishment but in 1938, Congress ruled that they could not make laws concerning Wyoming lands if Wyoming representatives did not favor them. Legally, the NPS's hands were tied, and Rockefeller, after his visit in 1927, he was stuck with the 32,000 acres (13,000 ha) and an annual tax bill of $13,000 (equivalent to $219,008 in 2022 dollars).

Finally on November 27, 1942 Rockefeller told Secretary of the Interior Harold L. Ickes that if the project did not progress, he would divest himself of the land. This action prompted Ickes and the National Park Service to suggest the Grand Teton National Monument as a way to circumvent the congressional disapproval that occurred in 1938. Roosevelt agreed, and on March 15, 1943 the monument was established.

== Legal battle ==
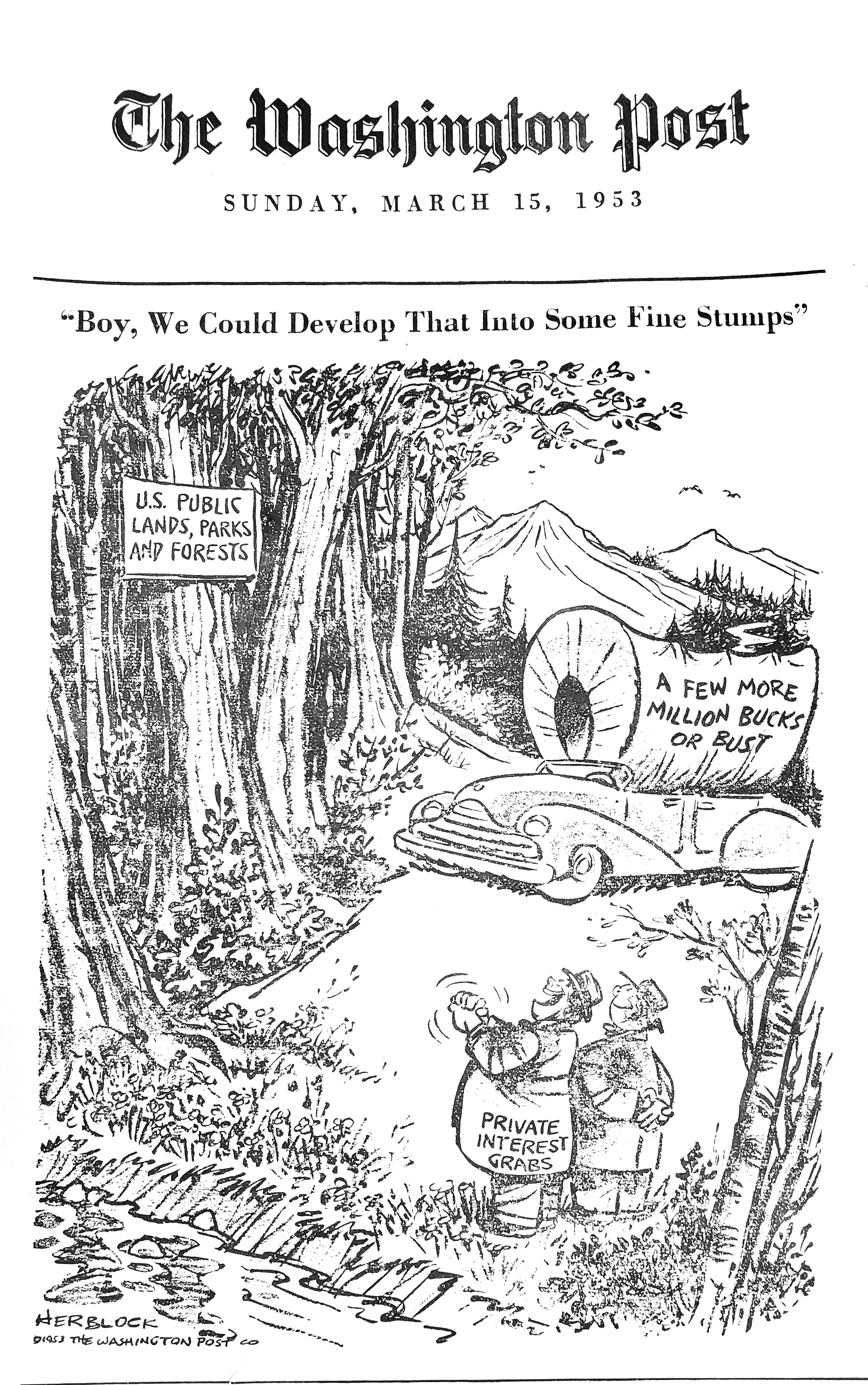
1953 political cartoon illustrating how the US public's opinion of their national parks shifted in support of conservation and preservation against private interests.

On March 19, 1943 Rep. Frank A. Barret in the House of Representatives introduced the bill H.R. 2241 to abolish the national monument and revert the land back to its status as a national forest. This was not a new phenomenon, however, as many American national monuments converted to parks in the 20th century faced strong opposition from private interests like mining and cattle companies.

Barret made his case in front of the 78th congress stating that "...There is not a thing that is so important that it should be a National Park...it is beneficial for grazing purposes for the livestock and for farming purposes and nothing more..." Barret was speaking on the behalf of the Wyoming Stock Growers Association and the other privately owned ranches in the area who feared losing their income and homes to the National Park Service. Barrett advocated for the land to be reverted back into a national forest so that the existing grazing permits could continue. Barret argued that Roosevelt was not in his right to use section two of the Antiquities Act of 1906 since he believed there was nothing geologically, biologically, historically, or culturally worth protecting in the valley. He then accused Roosevelt and Rockefeller of non-transparency with their plans. Claiming that Roosevelt hadn't attempted to compensate Teton county for the loss of revenue from private property taxes and accusing Rockefeller of unfair compensation to the property owners that sold their land.

County Commissioner Clifford Hansen also spoke up at the session arguing that "...historically [Jackson Hole National Monument] has little to add to the picture of the West.." However, Hansen had a vested interest in the land and grazing permits since his family's ranch was affected by the proclamation.

The bill to abolish the monument passed through the U.S. House and Senate in favor of the ranchers. But on December 29, 1944 President Roosevelt issued a pocket veto and memorandum of disapproval that killed the bill. He stated in his memorandum:

"The effect of this bill would be to deprive the people of the United States of the benefits of an area of national significance from the standpoint of naturalistic, historic, scientific, and recreational values."

In response to the fierce opposition of the monument, conservationists like Horace M. Albright, Olaus Murie, Struthers Burt, Director of National Park Services Newton B. Drury, and the Izaak Walton League of America, mounted a large defensive of the monument to the public. They distributed countless pamphlets, magazines, and newspaper articles urging the public and the U.S. government to make the monument into a park. They offered support and scientific studies of the area to prove that not only did the park have significance in one category of the Antiquity Act but it had significance in all categories. Horace Albright, director of the American Planning and Civic Association, spoke before the Planning and Civic Committee in 1943. He made several points about Jackson Hole's ecological importance (it contained the largest North American Elk herd in the nation and other unique Rocky Mountain wildlife like the sage grouse), its geological importance as the largest example of a fault-block formation in the US, and its historical importance as a landmark of the interaction between the Native Americans and trappers of the early American West. Albright pointed out that part of the national park's revenue would go directly back into the county and state in order to cover any tax revenue losses. He explained that if the area were to remain a national monument that the National Park Service would not be able to maintain the roads and trails in the area, they wouldn't be able to prevent forest fires, or perform other necessary maintenance procedures until the monument became a park. The national outlook began to shift in favor of the park and preservation of its wildlife.

In 1945, spurred by the World War II state of emergency, Senator Ickes allowed temporary grazing to continue within the park to meet national demands but refused to open all national parks to free range cattle in order to protect the natural wildlife and vegetation. At his request, the Department of the Interior conducted a study of the utility of grazing on national park land and ultimately came to the conclusion that opening national park borders to commercial grazing would have a negligible effect on the size of cattle herds, but the overgrazing of national parks would cause irreversible damage to the protected areas.

The Izaak Walton League of America also published a pamphlet labeled "dollars and sense" that statistically disproved ranchers' claims about how detrimental the establishment of the park would be on their number of cattle and price of their land. In 1947 the pamphlet reported there were 1,043,000 total head of cattle in Wyoming. Of those million, only 3,000 used the National Monument land to graze for less than half the year, that was less than one percent of total Wyoming cattle. Barrett and others argued that the land donated to the U.S. Government would be removed from tax rolls and shrink the financial foundation of Teton county. Losses on land value were projected to occur in the eyes of the cattle industry but contrarily Dollars and Sense printed the numbers comparatively from $5.15 per 1 acre (0.40 ha) in 1943 to $5.36 per 1 acre (0.40 ha) in 1946.

== Resolution ==
Map of the 1972 addition of the John D. Rockefeller Memorial Highway.

On September 14, 1950, the 81st congress approved S. 3409 which officially merged the national park and the monument into one park. They approved the bill under the stipulation that "...no further extension or establishment of national parks or monuments in Wyoming may be undertaken except by express authorization of the Congress." Other stipulations were made to appease the anti-park opposition. Congress created a section within the bill that funneled a portion of the proceeds and taxes the Park made back into Teton County. The grazing licenses that were currently held on park lands were to be honored until their expiration and were to be renewed as the Secretary of the Interior saw fit.

The merge of the park and monument occurred just as park tourism numbers spiked nationally. In 1950, 189,286 people visited the Grand Teton National Park. Those numbers jumped to over one million in 1954. This phenomenon can be attributed to the end of World War II and families wanting to spend peaceful time outdoors in their nation's parks. The New Deal also contributed to plentiful funds for parks to establish roads and amenities for tourists. However this upset preservationists like the previous director of the Izaak Walton League of America, Olaus Murie, who whole-heartedly supported the park but criticized the NPS's and Rockefeller's decision to open and develop the land for public use.

There were several more attempts to secure grazing rights on the national park land after its establishment and the National Park Service granted a few exceptions but no more bills passed in Congress.

In 1972 in honor of John D. Rockefeller, Jr.'s contribution to the park a memorial highway was added that connected the north end of Grand Teton National Park and the South Entrance of Yellowstone National Park.
