= Malcolm S. Muir =

British epidemiologist (1930–1995)

Malcolm Stewart Muir FRSE (1930–1995) was a 20th-century British epidemiologist and "geographic pathologist". Friends and colleagues knew him as Calum Muir. Famed for his cancer research he was a joint founder of the Singapore Cancer Society and served as its Secretary 1964 to 1967.

== Life ==
He was born in Sorbie in Wigtownshire on 23 April 1930 the son of the local school headmaster. The family moved to Stirling in central Scotland and he was educated at Stirling High School. He then studied medicine at Glasgow University graduating MB ChB in 1952. He received placements at the Royal Victoria Infirmary in Newcastle and the Glasgow Royal Infirmary. He trained in pathology at Neath General and the Birmingham Accident Hospital.

In 1955/56 he served 18 months National Service in the Royal Army Medical Corps serving in Sudan and at the British Military Hospital in Singapore. At the termination of his National Service he chose to stay in Singapore and obtained a post lecturing in Pathology at the University of Malaya. There he gained a doctorate (PhD) and Masters in Pathology in 1963. In 1967 he left Singapore and resettled in France at the International Centre for Cancer Research in Lyon. In 1979 he became Head of Descriptive Epidemiology at the Centre and in 1986 became Depute Director of the Organisation. He left in 1991 to take on the role of director of the Scottish Cancer Registration body.

In 1994 he was elected a Fellow of the Royal Society of Edinburgh. His proposers were H. John Evans, Sir Alastair Currie, Sir A. P. M. Forrest, C. R. W. Edwards, J. A. Wyke, C. C. Bird and John S. Beck.

He died of cancer on 21 June 1995.

== Publications ==
- Cancer Incidence in Five Continents (major contributor)
- Human Cancer: Epidemiology and Environmental Causes (1992) with Higgindson and Munoz

== Family ==
In 1956 he married Jessie McClymont Walker, whom he met at Glasgow Royal Infirmary. They had three sons: Lindsay, Ewan and Douglas.
