= Olaus Murie =

American naturalist and author

Olaus J. Murie
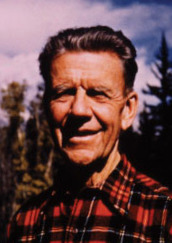
- Murie in 1953
- Born: March 1, 1889; Moorhead, Minnesota, U.S.
- Died: October 21, 1963 (aged 74); Moose, Wyoming, U.S.
- Education: undergraduate degree: Pacific University, Forest Grove, Oregon; University of Michigan MS
- Occupations: author, ecologist, forester, wildlife biologist, and environmentalist
- Spouse: Margaret Murie
- Relatives: see Murie family article
- Writing career
- Subjects: Ecology, Conservation, Wilderness Preservation
- Notable work: Elk of North America
- Notable awards: Pugsley Medal, Audubon Medal, Sierra Club John Muir Award

Olaus Johan Murie (March 1, 1889 – October 21, 1963), called the "father of modern elk management", was a naturalist, author, and wildlife biologist who did groundbreaking field research on a variety of large northern mammals. Rather than conducting empirical experiments, Murie practiced a more observational-based science.

Murie focused his research on the North American continent by conducting vast studies throughout Canada, Alaska and Wyoming. Through these constructive yet sometimes treacherous trips, Murie was able to gain valuable experience observing species and collecting specimens. During his first expedition to Canada, Murie discovered his passion for fieldwork and was able to develop resourceful skills from his indigenous guides, which were critical for his survival in such a harsh environment. Murie employed many of these same skills as he travelled to Alaska and finally to Wyoming.

These trips served as the foundation for many of his key ideas about wildlife management and conservation. As a scientist of the U.S. Biological Survey, Murie developed key ideas concerning predator prey relationships. Generally unheard of during his time, Murie argued that a healthy predator population was key to ensuring a harmonious balance between predator and prey populations. Murie used these ideas to improve current wildlife management practices.

Throughout his life, Murie advocated on behalf of wildlife conservation and management. With his wife, Mardie Murie, he successfully campaigned to enlarge the boundaries of the Olympic National Park, and to create the Jackson Hole National Monument and the Arctic National Wildlife Refuge. During his career, Murie held many respected positions within environmental organizations. He served as president of The Wilderness Society, The Wildlife Society, and as director of the Izaak Walton League.

== Early life ==
Murie was born on March 1, 1889, in Moorhead, Minnesota, the child of Norwegian immigrants. Growing up in this less urbanized region helped foster a love for the wilderness from an early age. Murie studied biology at Fargo College, private liberal arts college of the Congregational Church. When his zoology professor moved to Pacific University in Oregon, he offered Murie a scholarship to transfer there, where he completed studies in zoology and wildlife biology and was graduated in 1912. He did graduate work at the University of Michigan and was granted an M.S. in 1927. He began his career as an Oregon State conservation officer and participated in scientific explorations of Hudson Bay and Labrador, financed by the Carnegie Museum. He joined the U.S. Bureau of Biological Survey (now the U.S. Fish and Wildlife Service) in 1920 as a wildlife biologist, spending the next 6 years in the field with his brother Adolph Murie, studying Alaskan caribou, mapping migratory routes and estimating numbers. He married Margaret Thomas in 1924 in Anvik, Alaska. They spent their honeymoon tracking caribou through the Koyukuk River region.

== Books and articles ==
In 1927, the Biological Survey assigned Murie to research the Jackson Hole elk herd, resulting in the classic publication The Elk of North America. He also authored six other major publications, including Alaska-Yukon Caribou (North American Fauna [NAF] No. 54, 1935); Food Habits of the Coyote in Jackson Hole, Wyoming (1935); Field Guide to Animal Tracks (1954); Fauna of the Aleutian Islands and Alaska Peninsula (NAF No. 61, 1959); and Jackson Hole with a Naturalist (1963). Wapiti Wilderness (with his wife, Mardy Murie) was published posthumously, in 1966.

== Research, service, and wildlife organizations ==
=== Research ===
==== Canada ====
One of Murie's first experiences collecting specimens and conducting research was in 1914–1915 and 1917 in Canada. Hired by W. E. Clyde Todd, the curator of birds at the Carnegie Museum of Natural History, and accompanied by Native American guides Paul Commanda, William Morrison and Jack (Jocko) Couchai, Murie embarked on his apprenticeship to study wildlife in Canada in 1914. While on this trip, Murie had numerous jobs and expectations. Murie was responsible for collecting bird, rodent and larger mammal specimens, as well as sketching and taking photographs of different organisms and environments. To do so, Murie was required to preserve and label not only animal skins but also rolls of film that was to be given to Carnegie Museum. During his time in Canada, Olaus Murie travelled to various locations and became accustomed to the harsh environment of the Arctic. Murie decided to stay an extra winter in Canada to gain more experience, despite the departure of his colleagues. Murie used this additional time to collect more animal samples as well as explore the ecological and cultural similarities and differences of the Hudsonian and Arctic life zones.

Two years later, Murie returned to Canada with Clyde Todd, Alfred Marshall, a wealthy businessman, and guides Paul Commanda, Philip St. Onge and Charles Volant. The trip was ambitious, as they proposed to travel 700 miles north across Labrador, an expedition that had never been done before. They began by following the Ste. Marguerite River until they reached the Labrador Plateau, which they were required to trek across to access the Moisie River. Eventually they reached the Hamilton River and finally Ungava Bay and their destination, Fort Chimo. Although the trip was not without its trials, especially when they were unsure of the correct direction of their destination, it was a success overall for amassing specimens. In total 1,862 specimens were collected, which represented 141 species of birds and 30 species of mammals. Murie's time in Canada provided him with skills needed for a lifetime working in wildlife biology. Because of the pristine and relatively untouched conditions of the arctic due to the lack of humans, Murie was able to establish a more holistic understanding of humans’ impact on an environment, which he would develop more in subsequent trips around North America.

==== Alaska ====
In 1920, following his work in Canada, Murie accepted a position working for the U.S. Biological Survey in Alaska, studying the caribou in Alaska to locate the largest caribou populations, with the intention of crossbreeding them with reindeer. Murie was also expected to collect specimens of various animals, and act as a Fur Warden by enforcing laws that protected animals against illegal fur trade practices.

Murie was also encouraged to ensure large caribou populations in the region. To do so, one practice employed by the U.S. Biological Survey during this time was predator poisoning, which reduced predator populations in order to increase prey species. However, the more Murie studied caribou populations, the more he opposed this idea.] Although Murie at first was not extremely vocal in his opposition, he began to express his views. He remarked, “I have a theory that a certain amount of preying on caribou by wolves is beneficial to the herd, that the best animal[s] survive and the vigor of the herd is maintained. Man's killing does not work in this natural way, as the best animals are shot and inferior animals left to breed. I think that good breeding’s as important in game animals as it is in domestic stock. With our game, however we have been accustomed to reverse the process killing off the finest animals and removing the natural enemies which tend to keep down the unfit.”

Murie saw that hunting by humans was counter to trends produced by nature, and counteracted Darwin's survival of the fittest. He believed the true cause of a reduction in elk populations was not wolves, but rather human economic drive. Murie believed that the “caribou’s greatest menace is not the wolf nor the hunter but man's economic development, principally the raising of reindeer”. Murie observed that elk, along with other wild species, needed ample land to survive. Thus, to ensure a specie's survival, Murie argued that preservation of its habitat was necessary.

While Murie was critical of his own agency's ways, it was not until later in his life that he became more outspoken in his views. Besides allowing Murie to formulate his own ideas towards conservation, his time in Alaska gave him additional experience working in the field and resulted in more recognition for him in the realm of field biology.]

==== Wyoming ====
In 1927, after his time in Alaska, Murie was hired by the National Elk Commission to determine the cause of the elk winterkill problem in Jackson Hole, Wyoming. As the chief field biologist, Murie concluded that human development was causing overcrowding in the elk's winter range. Murie was one of the first to discover that these elk historically resided in the mountains and not solely in the plains thus contributing to overcrowding. Although a National Elk Refuge existed in this region consisting of 4,500 acres, this refuge had some unexpected consequences. Due to supplemental feeding and a rougher browse, elk were developing bacterial lesions in their throat and mouth called necrotic stomatitis or calf diphtheria. The squirrel-tail grass seeds found on the refuge contributed to the irritation of these lesions and the close proximity of elk allowed for the bacteria to spread easily. Through these observations, Murie determined that protecting the elk's habitat initially, would have been more beneficial than attempting to mitigate the problem later.

==== New Zealand ====
Due to Murie's extensive knowledge of elk in their native habitat, he was shoulder-tapped by Colonel John K. Howard to be the scientific leader of the 1949 New Zealand American Fiordland Expedition. Murie's son, Donald, was also part of the 49-strong expedition team, who spent January to May 1949 in Fiordland National Park. The main aim of the expedition was to study the elk (wapiti) population that had been established in the park in 1905, but the large interdisciplinary team also comprised New Zealand biologists from other fields in zoology, botany, geology, and forest survey, as well as surveyors and photographers.

=== Service and wildlife organizations ===
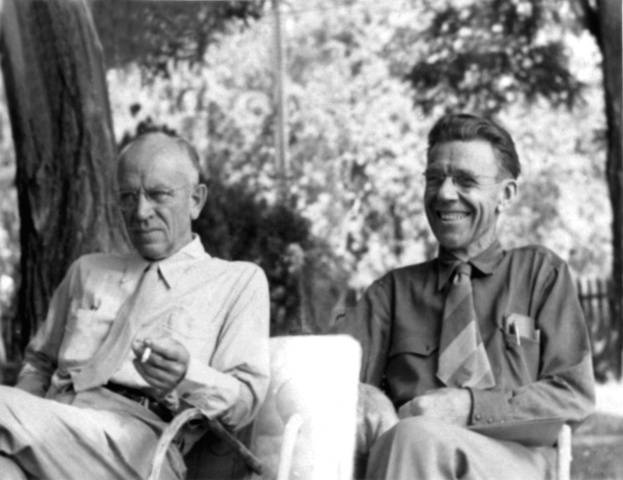
Murie (right) with Aldo Leopold at the annual meeting of The Wilderness Society Council in 1946

In 1937, Murie accepted a council seat on the recently created Wilderness Society. In this role, Murie lobbied successfully against the construction of large federal dams within Glacier National Park, Dinosaur National Monument, Rampart Dam on Alaska's Yukon River and the Narrows Dam proposed for the mouth of Snake River Canyon.

Murie helped to enlarge existing national park boundaries and to create additional new units. Testimony on the boundaries of Olympic National Park helped to convince President Franklin D. Roosevelt to add the temperate rain forest of the Bogachiel River and Hoh Rain Forest in the Hoh River valley. Lobbying for a natural boundary for the elk of the Grand Teton area, Murie helped to create Jackson Hole National Monument in 1943 (it was upgraded to national park status several years later, then incorporated into the Grand Teton National Park). The Jackson Hole National Monument was especially near to his heart because he had studied the elk in this region for a long period of time. Before it was distinguished as a national park, Murie and others encouraged John D. Rockefeller Jr to purchase the land and donate it to the federal government. During this time Murie was unaware that Rockefeller intended to create " a wildlife display" so tourists could easily view wild animals without actually putting in much effort. Murie greatly opposed this measure, believing that it would actually reduce the value and appreciation of nature by making it so available and convenient for people. In his article "Fenced Wildlife for Jackson Hole" he stated that "commercialized recreation has tend more and more to make us crave extra service, easy entertainment, pleasure with the least possible exertion." He believed instead that "national parks were created for preservation in their primitive conditions."

Once the park was established in 1943, Murie was appointed as the head of the Wildlife Management Division of the National Park Service and was in charge of creating a management plan for the monument. Despite protest from local sportsmen, Murie banned hunting within the national park. Even when the state of Wyoming, in the case State of Wyoming V Franke, claimed that the additional land held no archeological, scientific or scenic interest, Murie stood by the decision to deem it a national park. He maintained that the park had biological significance with countless species of birds and mammals that lived within the park. Although in the end the court announced it could not interfere in the matter, conservationists such as Murie interpreted this as a win for their side.

With a new position as Director of the Wilderness Society, Murie would continue to fight for and defend existing national parks. Murie relied on techniques that stressed the economic value of national preservation sites because he knew this was the most effective way to appeal to America's public. For instance, in the case of Jackson Hole National Monument, he emphasized how new tourism was contributing to Jackson's local economy. Murie would go on to advocate for the preservation of many additional parks from human development. He believed that those who wished to "seek the solitude of the primitive forest" should have the ability to do so and that a democratic society should protect this right.

In 1956, Murie began a campaign with his wife to protect what is now the Arctic National Wildlife Refuge. The couple recruited U.S. Supreme Court Justice William O. Douglas to help persuade President Dwight Eisenhower to set aside 8,000,000 acres (32,000 km^{2}) as the Arctic National Wildlife Range.

== Awards, honors ==
In 1948, Murie became the first American Fulbright Scholar in New Zealand and conducted research in the Fiordland National Park, acting as scientific leader in the 1949 New Zealand American Fiordland Expedition. In 1950, Murie became president of The Wilderness Society. He was also a president of the Wildlife Society and a director of the Izaak Walton League. He received the Aldo Leopold Memorial Award Medal in 1952, the Pugsley Medal in 1953, the Audubon Medal in 1959, and the Sierra Club John Muir Award in 1962.

Olaus Murie died on October 21, 1963. The Murie Residence in Moose, Wyoming was added to the National Register of Historic Places in 1990, and as part of the Murie Ranch Historic District was designated a National Historic Landmark in 2006. The house and grounds are the headquarters for the Murie Foundation, a non-profit organization dedicated to conservation work.
