= Toklat River =

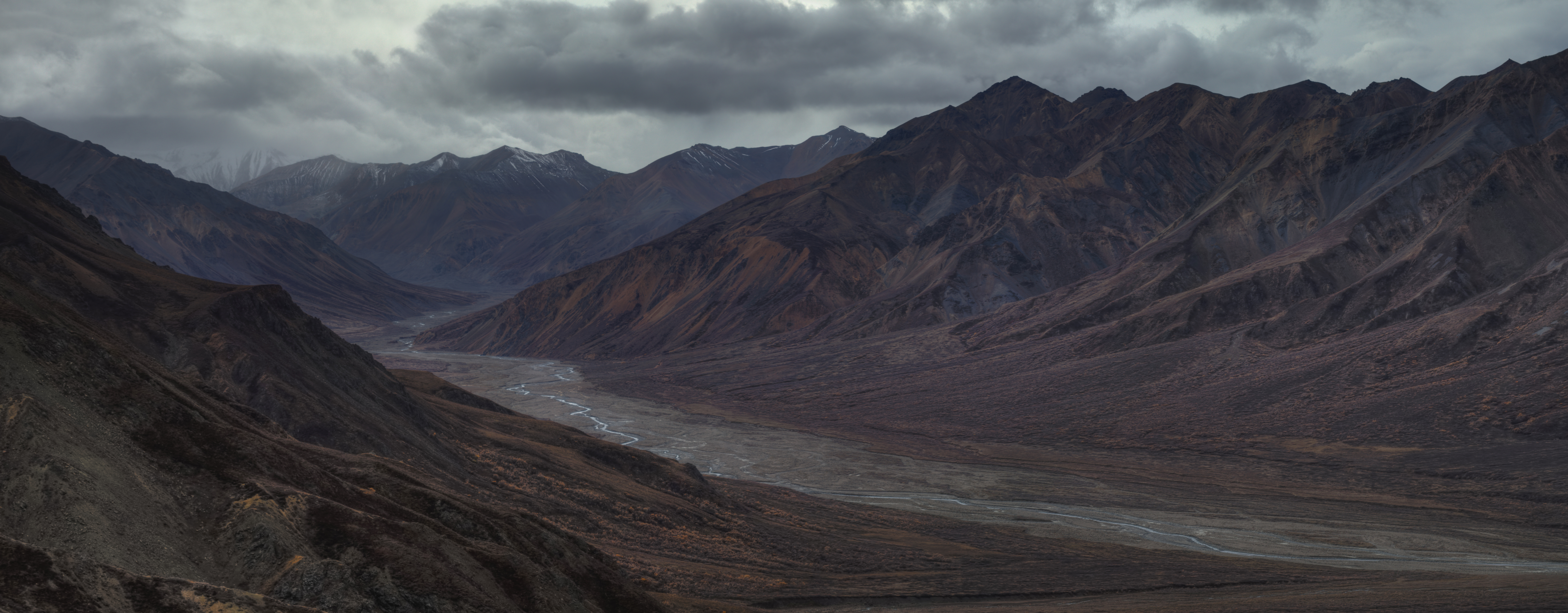

- Location of the mouth of the Toklat River in Alaska

Location
- Country: United States
- State: Alaska
- District: Denali Borough, Yukon–Koyukuk Census Area

Physical characteristics
- Source
  - location: Denali National Park and Preserve, Denali Borough
  - coordinates: 63°24′03″N 149°54′42″W
  - elevation: 4,195 ft (1,279 m)
- Mouth: Kantishna River
  - location: 50 miles (80 km) east of Bitzshtini Mountains, Yukon–Koyukuk Census Area
  - coordinates: 64°27′15″N 150°18′43″W
  - elevation: 377 ft (115 m)
- Length: 85 mi (137 km)

The Toklat River (Lower Tanana: Tootl'o Huno') is an 85-mile (137 km) tributary of the Kantishna River in central Alaska in the United States It drains an area on the north slope of the Alaska Range on the south edge of the Tanana Valley southwest of Fairbanks. It issues from unnamed glaciers in the northern Alaska Range in Denali National Park and Preserve, northeast of Denali. It flows generally northwest through hilly country to the tundra to the north of the Alaska Range.

The river was described as the Toclat by Lt. H.T. Allen in 1885. Other names or variants include Tootl'ot Huno, Tootl'ot Huno' Hutl'ot, Tootl'ot No' and Tutlut River. Depth of 50 ft, width of 25 ft

== Gallery ==
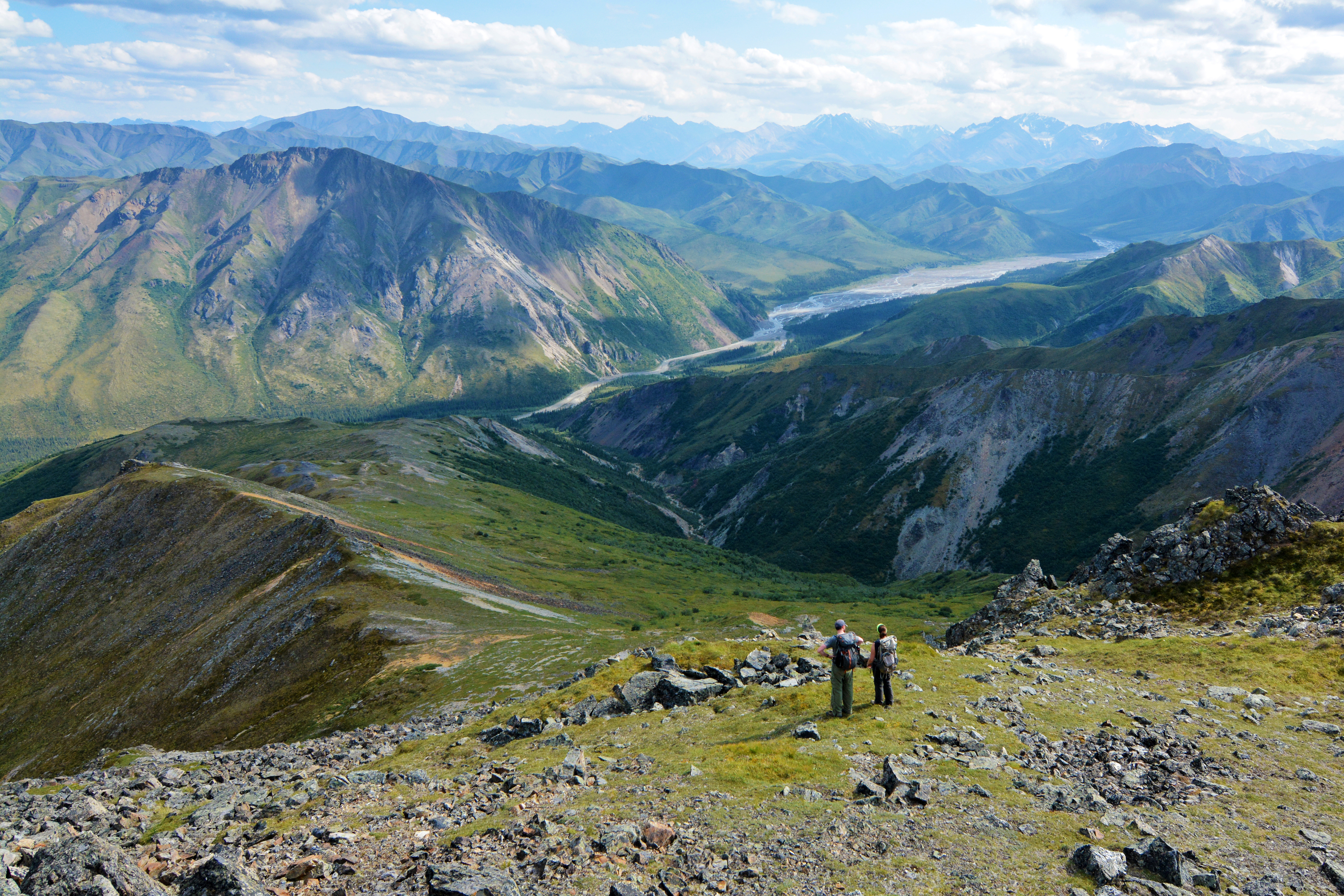
The East Fork Toklat River winds out of the high mountains of Denali National Park

== See also ==
- List of rivers of Alaska
