= Adolph Murie =

American naturalist and author

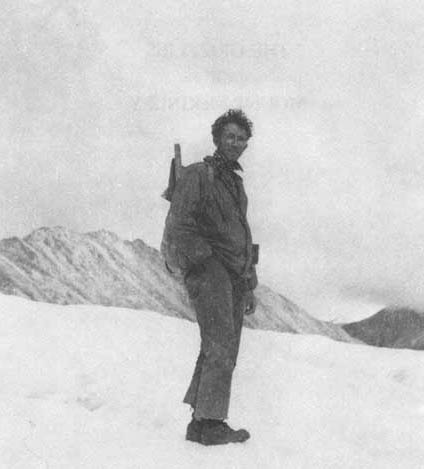
- Adolph Murie on Muldrow Glacier, 1939, Mount McKinley National Park
- Born: September 6, 1899; Moorhead, Minnesota
- Died: August 16, 1974 (aged 74); Moose, Wyoming
- Education: University of Michigan
- Occupations: Author, ecologist, forester, wildlife biologist, and environmentalist
- Spouse: Louise Murie
- Writing career
- Subjects: Conservation, Wilderness Preservation, Animal Behaviors
- Notable works: Wolves of Mount McKinley; A Naturalist in Alaska

Adolph Murie (September 6, 1899 – August 16, 1974), the first scientist to study wolves in their natural habitat, was an American naturalist, author, and wildlife biologist who pioneered field research on wolves, bears, and other mammals and birds in Arctic and sub-Arctic Alaska. He was also instrumental in protecting wolves from eradication and in preserving the biological integrity of the Denali National Park and the Arctic National Wildlife Refuge. In 1989 Professor John A. Murray of the English Department at the University of Alaska, Fairbanks received an NEH grant to inventory the extensive Adolph Murie written and slide archives at Rasmusson Library in the Arctic and Polar Collection. He wrote a forty-page report and biographical narrative of Adolph Murie, which remains unpublished but which is in his papers.

== Early life ==
Adolf Winstrom was born on September 6, 1899, in Moorhead, Minnesota, the child of Ed and Marie Winstrom. In 1922, prior to completing college, Adolph Murie joined his brother, Olaus Murie, on an expedition to Mount McKinley National Park, the first of many trips he would make to Alaska to do biological research. Murie received a bachelor's degree from Concordia College, and attended graduate school at the University of Michigan, where he earned his Ph.D. in 1929. He subsequently worked on projects for the university's Zoology Museum, among other things doing research on mammals in Guatemala and British Honduras.

== Books and articles ==
In 1934, Adolph Murie went to work for the Wildlife Division of the National Park Service. In total, he would spend the better part of thirty-two years working for the National Park Service and earned the National Park Service Distinguished Service Award. In 1937, Murie conducted a study of coyotes in Yellowstone National Park, published as Ecology of the Coyote in Yellowstone. This book set off a storm of controversy within the Service, and represents one of the first studies published that argued against the Service's long tradition of predator eradication. In 1939, the National Park Service assigned Murie to assess the relationship between the Dall sheep and the wolf in the Mount McKinley area. The resulting book, The Wolves of Mt. McKinley, is considered a classic, especially given the detailed field observations which Murie spent hours collecting from 1939 to 1941, including the discovery that wolves ate mice. The publication of these two works led directly to the termination of the predator eradication programs in Yellowstone and Mount McKinley national parks. He based himself in 1939 at Sanctuary River Cabin No. 31, in Denali park, which is listed on the National Register of Historic Places.

== Service, research and wildlife organizations ==
Along with his brother, Olaus, Murie helped to enlarge existing national park boundaries and to create additional new units, notably the Jackson Hole National Monument in 1943 (it was upgraded to national park status several years later, then incorporated into the Grand Teton National Park).

Murie's book, A Naturalist in Alaska, won the John Burroughs Medal in 1963. In addition to his books, Murie published numerous articles against predator control programs and excessive human intrusion on wilderness areas. He wrote letters and submitted testimony to Congress regarding Isle Royale, Jackson Hole, Mount McKinley, and other wilderness areas threatened by development or predator control programs, including an article against pesticide use in Grand Teton National Park in 1966.

== Legacy ==
Adolph Murie suffered from epilepsy and died from a seizure on August 16, 1974, at the STS Ranch, now part of the Murie Ranch Historic District in Moose, Wyoming. The ranch was designated a National Historic Landmark in 1998, and the house and grounds are the headquarters for the Murie Center, a non-profit organization which, in partnership with Grand Teton National Park, engages people to understand and commit to conserving wildlife and wild places—the same values to which the Muries dedicated their lives.

In 1976 the Stanford University Law School established the "Olaus and Adolph Murie Award" for the best work done by a student in Environmental Law, and continues to give the award annually.

The Murie Science and Learning Center in Denali National Park was opened and officially dedicated to Adolph Murie on August 16, 2004. The center is open all seasons and serves as the visitor center for the park in the winter.

== Works by Adolph Murie ==
- Birds of Mount McKinley National Park, Alaska LCCN 64-7158
- The ecological relationship of two subspecies of Peromyscys in the Glacier park region (Ann Arbor, Michigan: The University of Michigan Press, 1933) LCCN a430-3482
- Fauna of the national parks of the United States. Ecology of the coyote in the Yellowstone (Washington, U.S. Govt. print office, 1940) LCCN 41-50357
- Following fox trails (Ann Arbor, Mich., University of Michigan press, 1936) LCCN 37-27580
- The Wolves of Mount McKinley (Seattle: University of Washington Press, 1985) ISBN 0-295-96203-8 (1944 edition at Internet Archive)
- The Grizzlies of Mount McKinley (Seattle: University of Washington Press, 1985) ISBN 0-295-96204-6
- Mammals from Guatemala and British Honduras (Ann Arbor, Mich., University of Michigan press, 1935) LCCN 35-28361
- Mammals of Denali (Alaska Natural History Association, 1994) ISBN 0-930931-12-2
- The moose of Isle Royale (Ann Arbor, Mich., University of Michigan press, 1934) LCCN 34-27764
- A naturalist in Alaska (Tucson: University of Arizona Press, 1990) ISBN 0-8165-1168-3
