= Kantishna =

Kantishna may refer to the following locations in Alaska:

- Kantishna, Alaska, an unincorporated community in Alaska
- Kantishna Airport, an airport near Kantishna
- Kantishna River, a river in Denali National Park
