= McKinley National Park Airport =

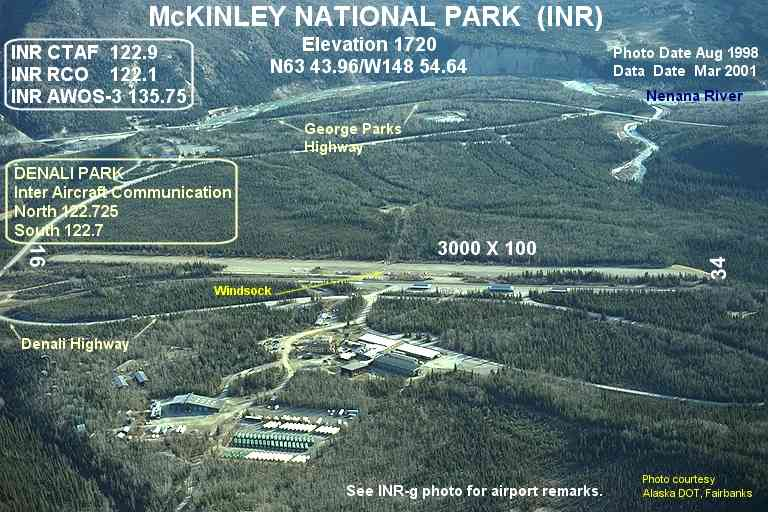
- IATA: MCL; ICAO: PAIN; FAA LID: INR

Summary
- Airport type: Public
- Owner: U.S. National Park Service
- Serves: McKinley Park, Alaska
- Location: Denali National Park and Preserve
- Elevation AMSL: 1,720 ft / 524 m
- Coordinates: 63°43′59″N 148°54′40″W

Map
- Location of airport in Alaska

Runways
| Direction | Length | | Surface |
| Direction | ft | m | Surface |
|---|---|---|---|
| 16/34 | 3,000 | 914 | Gravel |

Statistics (2005)
- Aircraft operations: 3,200
- Based aircraft: 7
- Source: Federal Aviation Administration

McKinley National Park Airport (IATA: MCL, ICAO: PAIN, FAA LID: INR, formerly 5MK) is a public-use airport located two nautical miles (3.7 km) northeast of Denali Park, in Denali Borough, Alaska, United States. It is owned by the U.S. National Park Service and is located at the Denali National Park and Preserve (previously Mount McKinley National Park).

Although most U.S. airports use the same three-letter location identifier for the FAA and IATA, this airport is assigned INR by the FAA and MCL by the IATA. The airport's ICAO identifier is PAIN.

== Facilities and aircraft ==
McKinley National Park Airport has one runway designated 16/34 with a gravel surface measuring 3,000 by 68 feet (914 x 21 m). For the 12-month period ending December 31, 2005, the airport had 3,200 aircraft operations, an average of 266 per month: 69% general aviation and 31% air taxi. At that time there were 7 aircraft based at this airport: 57% single-engine, 29% multi-engine and 14% helicopter.

== See also ==
- List of airports in Alaska
