= Fannie Quigley =

Alaskan pioneer and prospector (1870–1944)

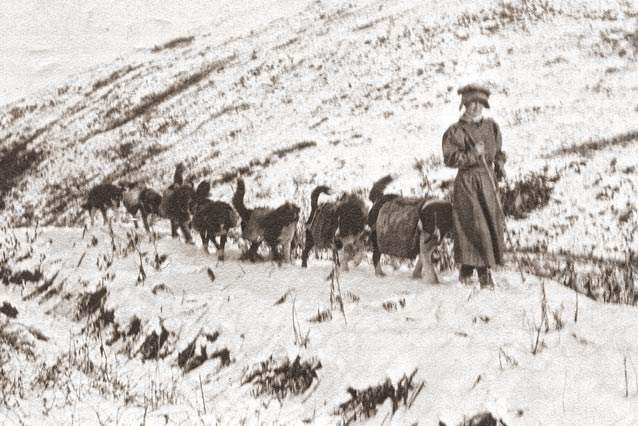
- Quigley and her dog sled team, transporting supplies to a mining camp in 1915.
- Born: Frances Sedlacek; 1870; Wahoo, Nebraska
- Died: August 25, 1944 (aged 73–74); Kantishna, Alaska

Fannie Quigley (1870 – August 25, 1944) was an American pioneer and prospector and cook who became involved in mining operations during the Klondike Gold Rush. Living in the wilderness of what is now Denali National Park and Preserve in Alaska, she was known for her hunting, trapping, and cooking skills.

== Biography ==
Quigley was born Frances Sedlacek in Wahoo, Nebraska, in 1870. She left home and headed west at age 16, finding employment at work camps along the growing Union Pacific Railroad. She continued her travels north during the Klondike Gold Rush, arriving in Dawson City, Yukon, in 1897. Quigley earned a living by cooking for prospectors; she would load up a sled with a portable stove and provisions, hike out to remote creeks where prospectors were often ill-prepared, and sell her meals from out of a tent. This work earned Quigley the nickname "Fannie the Hike". Quigley also began mining herself, and staked her first claim in Clear Creek in 1900.

Quigley married her first husband, Angus McKenzie, in 1900. Together, they operated a roadhouse on Hunker Creek, near Gold Bottom. After a turbulent few years together, Quigley left her husband and hiked to Rampart, Alaska.

In 1906, Quigley traveled to Kantishna, Alaska, which people had recently begun mining. She staked 26 claims between 1907 and 1919. Quigley married her second husband, Joe Quigley, in 1918, and they ran a mining operation together, leasing out their claims to miners.

Fannie Quigley provided for the mining camp by hunting, trapping, and growing food in her garden, and became known as an extraordinary backcountry cook. Because the Quigleys' cabin was located en route for mountaineering expeditions to Mount McKinley (now Denali), they hosted many visitors, including writer Jack London.

A practicing naturalist and nurse, Quigley went to work at the Nenana Hospital in Nenana, Alaska, in 1920, during the Spanish flu pandemic. In 1937, the Quigleys' mining claims were leased to the Red Top Mining Company; the Quigleys split the income as part of their divorce settlement.

After the divorce, Joe Quigley moved to Seattle and Fannie remained in Kantishna. Her cabin was now accessible by a road through Mount McKinley Park (previously, one could only access it by dog sled or on foot), and she hosted park personnel and dignitaries in her home.

== Death and legacy ==
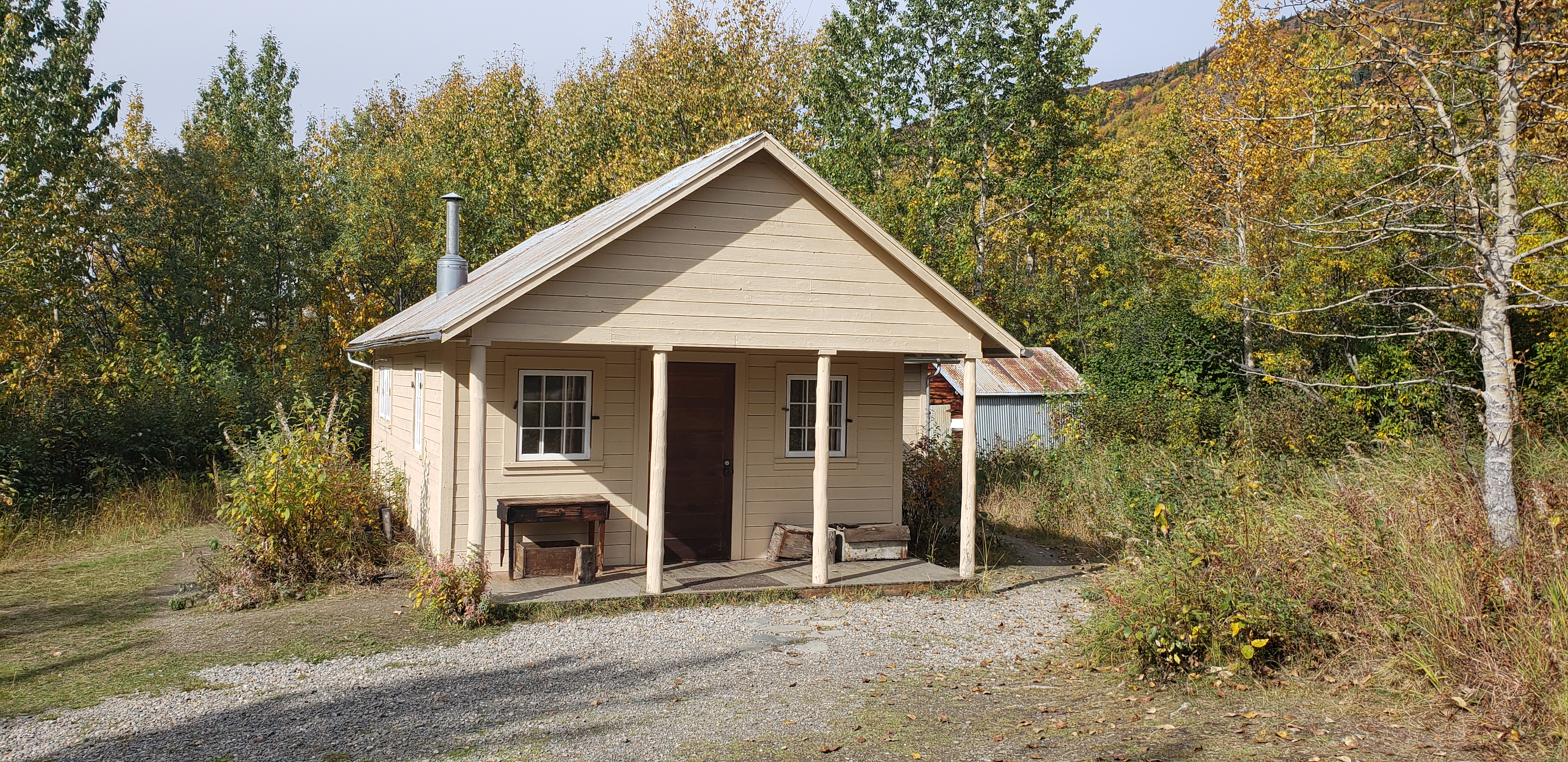
Quigley's home in Denali National Park, as photographed in 2019.

Quigley died in her cabin in 1944 at age 73. Today, visitors can visit the remnants of her homestead, located in what is now Denali National Park and Preserve.

Quigley was inducted into the Alaska Mining Hall of Fame in 2000. A biography by Jane G. Haigh, Searching for Fannie Quigley: A Wilderness Life in the Shadow of Mount McKinley, was published in 2007.
