= Mount McKinley National Park Headquarters District =

Historic district in Alaska, United States

- U.S. National Register of Historic Places
- U.S. Historic district
- Alaska Heritage Resources Survey
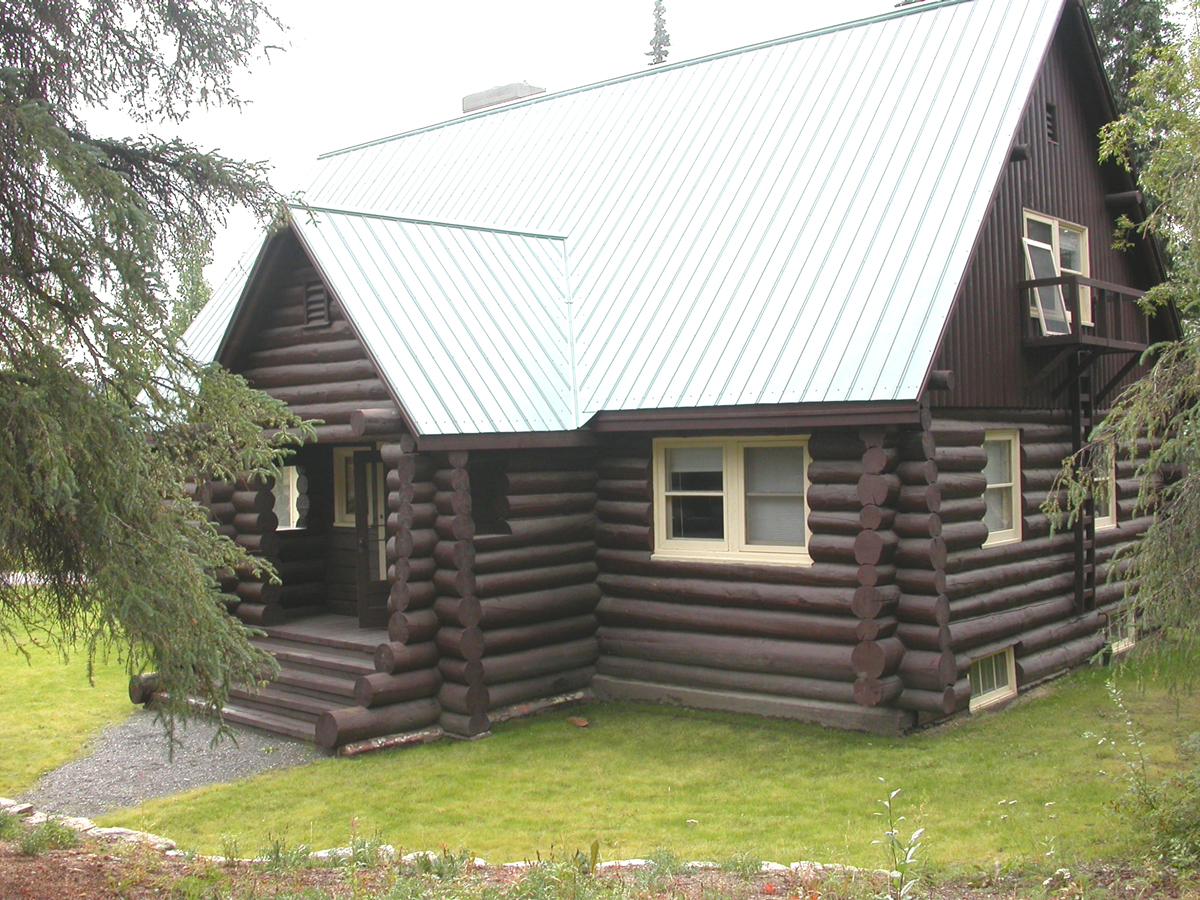
- Superintendent's residence, Denali National Park

- Location within Alaska

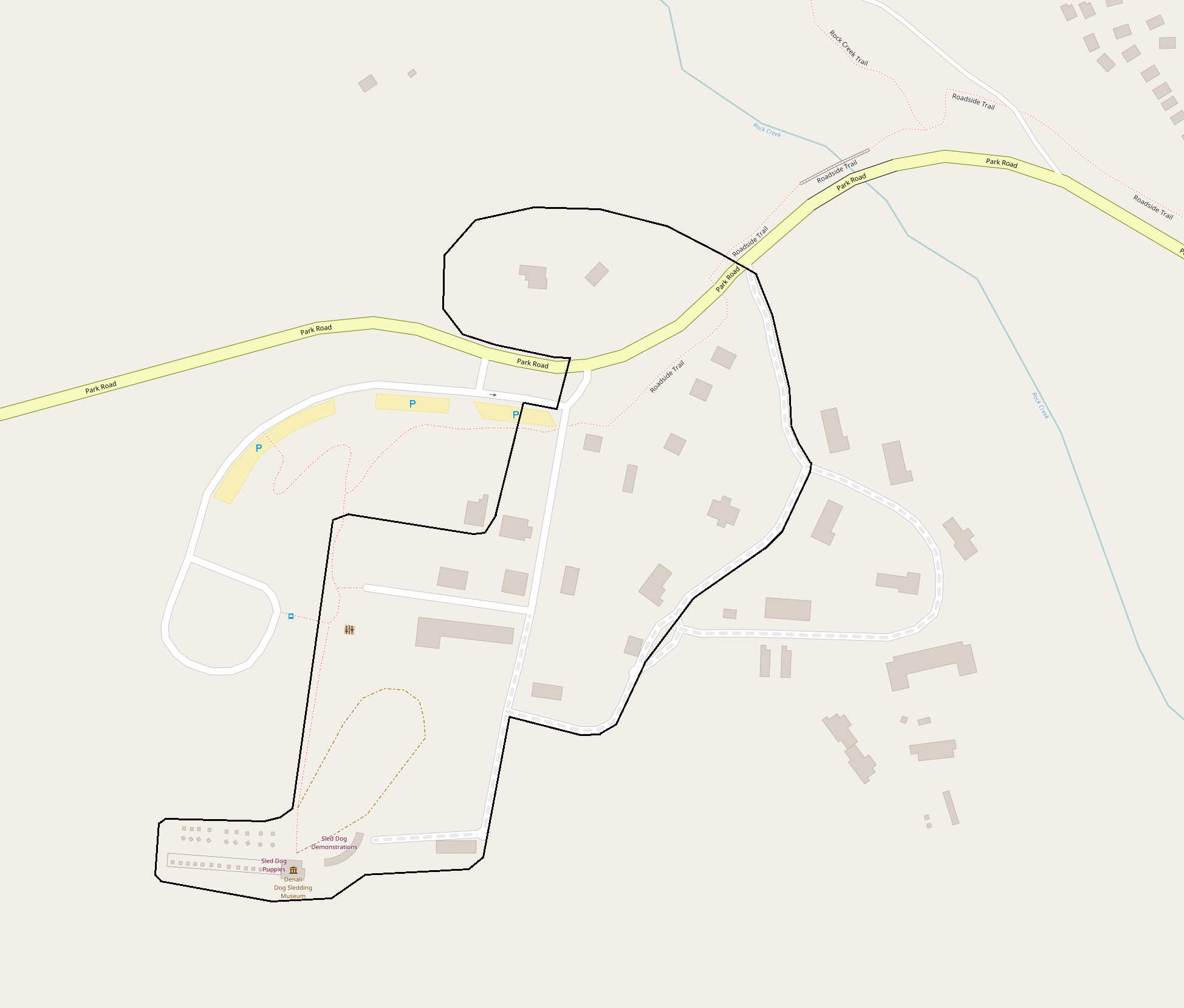
- Boundaries of Mount McKinley National Park Headquarters District
- Location: Mile 3.4 McKinley Park Highway, Denali National Park and Preserve, Alaska, U.S.
- Coordinates: 63°43′16″N 148°57′56″W
- Area: 11.91 acres (4.82 ha)
- Built by: National Park Service; Civilian Conservation Corps
- Architect: National Park Service
- NRHP reference No.: 87000975 (original); 100002397 (increase)
- AHRS No.: HEA-147

Significant dates
- Added to NRHP: October 23, 1987
- Boundary increase: May 10, 2018
- Designated AHRS: July 10, 1978

The Mount McKinley National Park Headquarters District in Alaska, United States, in what is now called Denali National Park was the original administrative center of the park. It contains an extensive collection of National Park Service Rustic structures, primarily designed by the National Park Service's Branch of Plans and Designs in the 1930s.

In 1920, the newly created park received funding to hire staff and establish an administrative area. When the Alaska Railroad reached the park in 1922, park headquarters were moved from the community of Nenana to a location near the new railroad station within the park boundaries. In the fall of 1925, park headquarters were moved to its current location. By 1927, nine structures, including those moved from the original site, occupied the headquarters district.

As the hub of park administrative and management, the headquarters area expanded according to detailed plans provided by the Branch of Plans and Design. As in many of the national parks during the Depression, the Civilian Conservation Corps had an important role in the development of conservation and recreation-oriented projects within the park as a whole and headquarters district in particular. Beginning in 1938, CCC accomplished many projects within the park, but most of their efforts focused on the headquarters area where they constructed sewer and water lines, roads, and buildings.

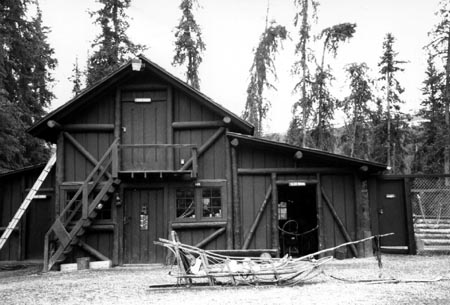
Dog feed cache and sled storage building

== Contributing properties ==
When first listed, the historical district contains a total of 14 contributing properties, built between 1926 and 1941. It was enlarged in 2018.

- Office Building, also known as the Old Museum, 63°43′20″N 148°57′56″W, built 1926.
- Warehouse, actually hosting the Museum 63°43′15″N 148°57′59″W, built 1928.
- Barn, also known as the Old Sign Shop, 63°43′13″N 148°57′58″W, built 1928–1929.
- Dog Feed Cache and Sled Storage, comprising dog houses and kennels 63°43′10″N 148°58′07″W, built 1929–1930.
- Electric Light Plant (Power House), also known as the Engineer Office, 63°43′17″N 148°57′55″W, built 1930–1931.
- Garage, also known as the Ranger Cache, 63°43′15″N 148°58′01″W, built 1931.
- Comfort Station, also known as the "John House", 63°43′17″N 148°57′54″W, built 1932.
- Boiler House, also known as the Plumbing Shop, 63°43′14″N 148°57′54″W, built 1932.
- Rangers' Dormitory, also known as the Administration Building, 63°43′16″N 148°57′59″W, built 1934–1935.
- Employee Residences, two buildings, 63°43′18″N 148°57′52″W, both built 1938.
- Superintendent's Garage 63°43′20″N 148°57′58″W, built 1939.
- Garage and Repair Shop, also known as the Carpenter Shop, 63°43′14″N 148°57′59″W, built 1939.
- Employee's Residence, also known as the Superintendent's Residence, 63°43′16″N 148°57′51″W, built 1940–1941.
