= Kantishna River =

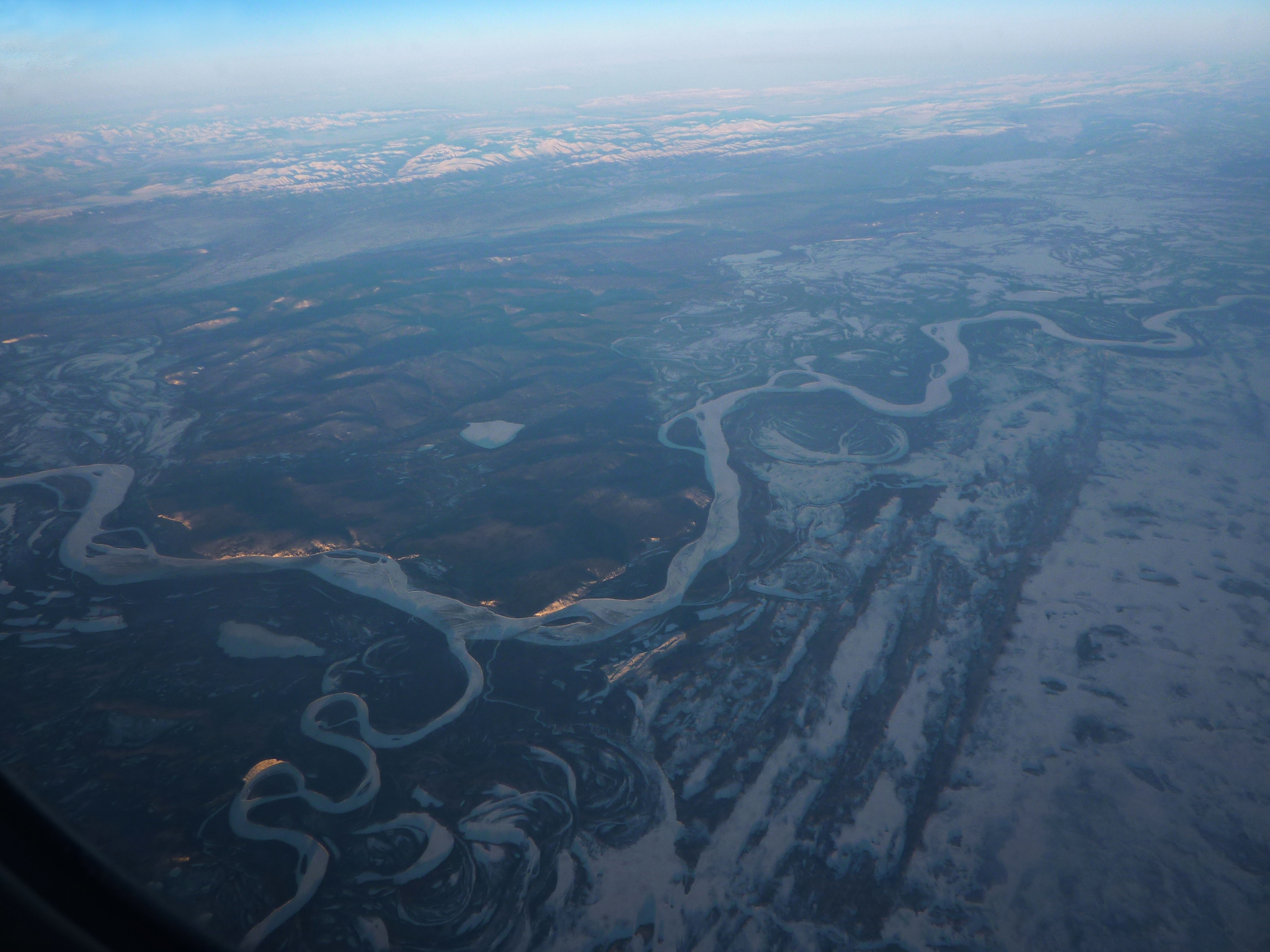
- Confluence of the Kantishna River (bottom left) with the Tanana River

- Location of the mouth of the Kantishna River in Alaska
- Native name: Khenteethno' (Lower Tanana)

Location
- Country: United States
- State: Alaska
- District: Denali Borough, Yukon–Koyukuk Census Area

Physical characteristics
- Source: confluence of McKinley River and Birch Creek
  - location: near Chilchukabena Lake, Denali National Park and Preserve, Denali Borough
  - coordinates: 63°51′58″N 151°33′22″W
  - elevation: 647 ft (197 m)
- Mouth: Tanana River
  - location: 32 miles (51 km) northwest of Nenana, Yukon–Koyukuk Census Area
  - coordinates: 64°45′44″N 149°57′56″W
  - elevation: 279 ft (85 m)
- Length: 108 mi (174 km)

Basin features
- Tributaries
  - left: John Hansen Creek
  - right: Bearpaw River, Toklat River

The Kantishna River (Lower Tanana: Khenteethno) is a 108-mile (174 km) tributary of the Tanana River in the U.S. state of Alaska. Formed by the confluence of the McKinley River with Birch Creek in Denali National Park and Preserve, it drains part of the north slope of the Alaska Range including the Denali massif. The direction of flow is generally north-northeast. The Toklat River is a major tributary.

== Boating ==
Boaters can float the Kantishna River and some of its tributaries in canoes, folding canoes and kayaks, or inflatable canoes and kayaks. Some trips begin at Lake Minchumina, run about 50 miles (80 km) down the Muddy River to Birch Creek, then downstream to the Birch–McKinley confluence (the source of the Kantishna) and then down the Kantishna to the Tanana. The entire trip is rated Class I (easy) on the International Scale of River Difficulty. Dangers include the possibility of dangerous winds on Minchumina Lake, as well as overhanging trees, stumps, and logs along the streams.

Another tributary, Moose Creek, can be floated for about 50 miles (80 km) beginning at Wonder Lake or Kantishna and entering the Kantishna River along its middle reaches near Bearpaw. From there to the Tanana, the run is the same as the Lake Minchumina float. The Moose Creek segment includes Class II (medium) rapids.

== See also ==
- List of rivers of Alaska
