= Kantishna, Alaska =

Unincorporated community in the state of Alaska, United States

- Unincorporated community
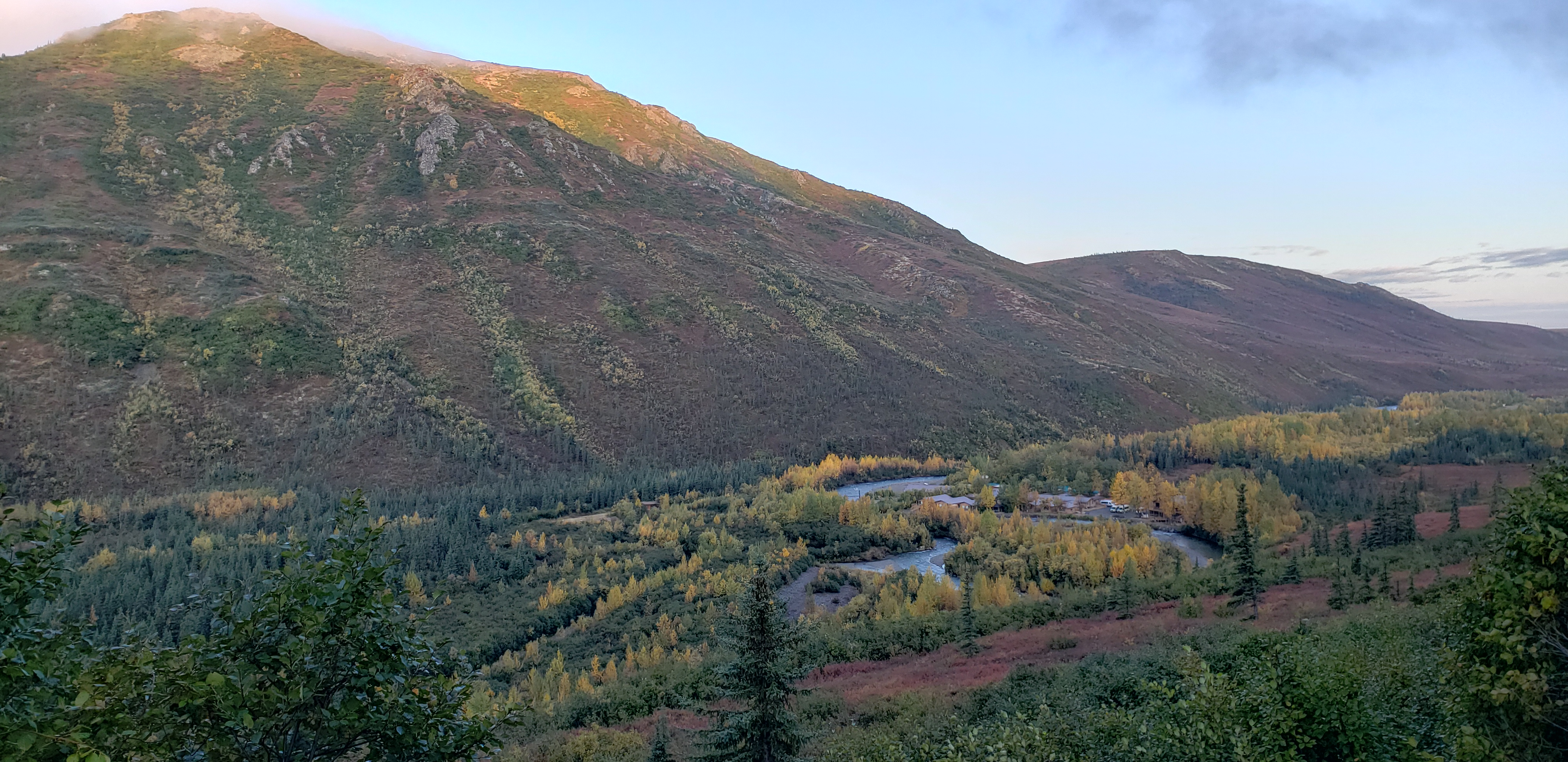
- Kantishna

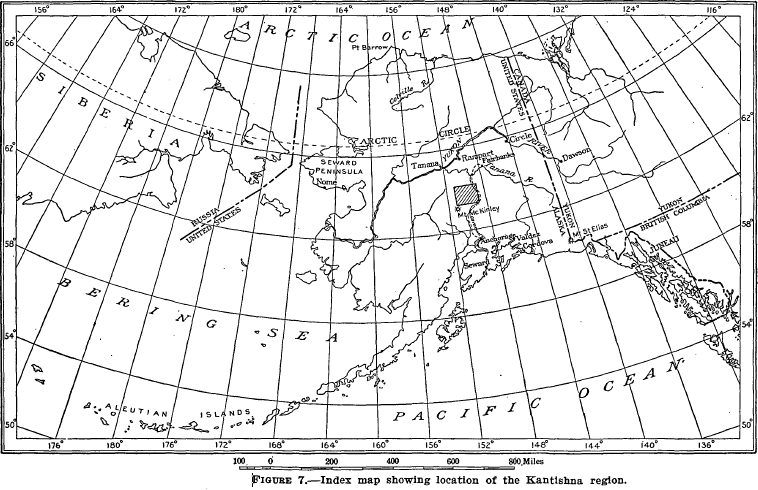

- Location within Alaska
- Coordinates: 63°31′31″N 150°57′29″W
- Country: United States
- State: Alaska
- Borough: Denali

Government
  - Borough mayor: Christopher Noel
  - State senator: George Rauscher (R)
  - State rep.: Kevin McCabe (R)
- Elevation: 1,696 ft (517 m)
- Time zone: UTC-9 (Alaska (AKST))
  - Summer (DST): UTC-8 (AKDT)
- ZIP codes: Kantishna is one of the sparsely-populated communities in Alaska that do not have a zip code.
- GNIS feature ID: 1404435

Kantishna is an unincorporated community in Denali Borough, Alaska, United States, within Denali National Park and Preserve. Founded as a gold mining camp in 1905, it endured longer than similar communities in the area, having been constructed nearest to the source of the gold. It lies in the Kantishna Hills at the junction of Eureka Creek and Moose Creek, 3 mi (5 km) northwest of Wonder Lake, and near the mouth of the Kantishna River. Although the community was once also called "Eureka", the Board on Geographic Names officially ruled in favor of "Kantishna" in 1944, the name given to the post office that was built at the site in 1905. Its elevation is 1,696 feet (517 m).

== Transportation and lodging ==
There are several remote lodges in Kantishna. Guests may stay at the Denali Backcountry Lodge, Kantishna Roadhouse, or Camp Denali/North Face Lodge. The 92.5-mile (148.9 km) trip from the Denali Park Train Depot to the lodges, via lodge buses, takes more than six hours. Private vehicles are not permitted to enter the interior of Denali National Park.

Kantishna Air Taxi service provides chartered flights to Kantishna Airport.

== Geology ==
Several thousand prospectors came to the Kantishna Hills region after placer gold was discovered in the summer of 1905 along Glacier Creek by Joe Quigley and Jack Horn. Almost simultaneously, Joe Dalton and his partner Stiles found gold along Friday Creek and staked a claim on July 12. Claims on Eureka Creek soon followed as did mining towns. These included Glacier on Bearpaw River, Diamond on Moose Creek, plus Roosevelt and Square Deal on McKinley River. By 1906 the towns of Roosevelt, Square Deal and Diamond were mainly deserted. In 1916, the population of the region was 35, half of whom were men working claims.

The placer gold originates from the Birch Creek schist, which is cut by quartz veins bearing gold, silver, and antimony in the form of stibnite. This schist is the oldest formation in the region and is bordered on the south by the Tonzona Group composed of black slates and argillites, and the Tatina Group composed on black slates, argillites, greywackes, and interbedded limestones and cherts.

Mining ceased in 1985, after the district was incorporated into the national park.

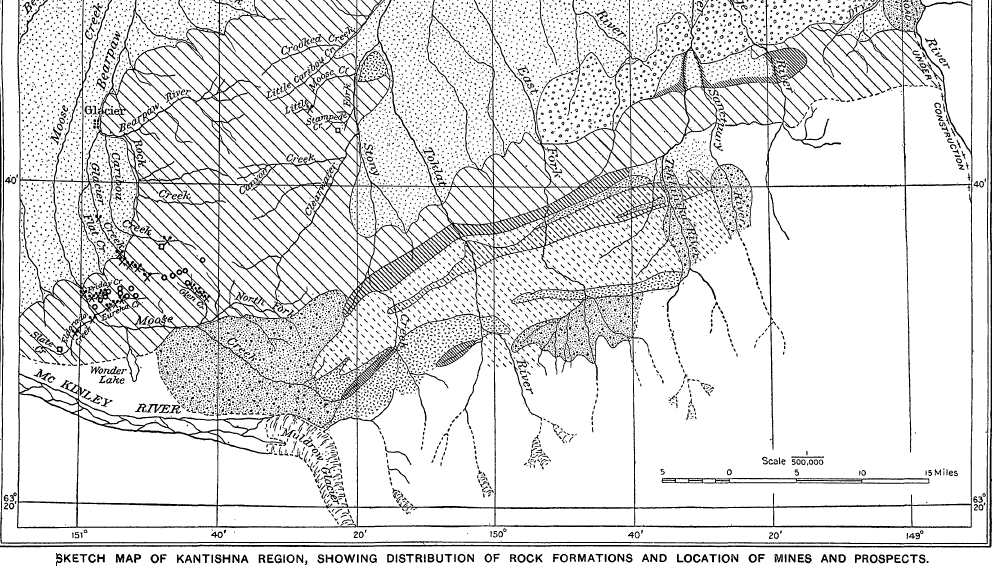
Kantishna Region geological map

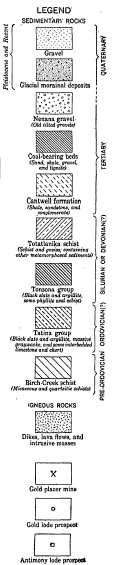
Kantishna Region geological map legend

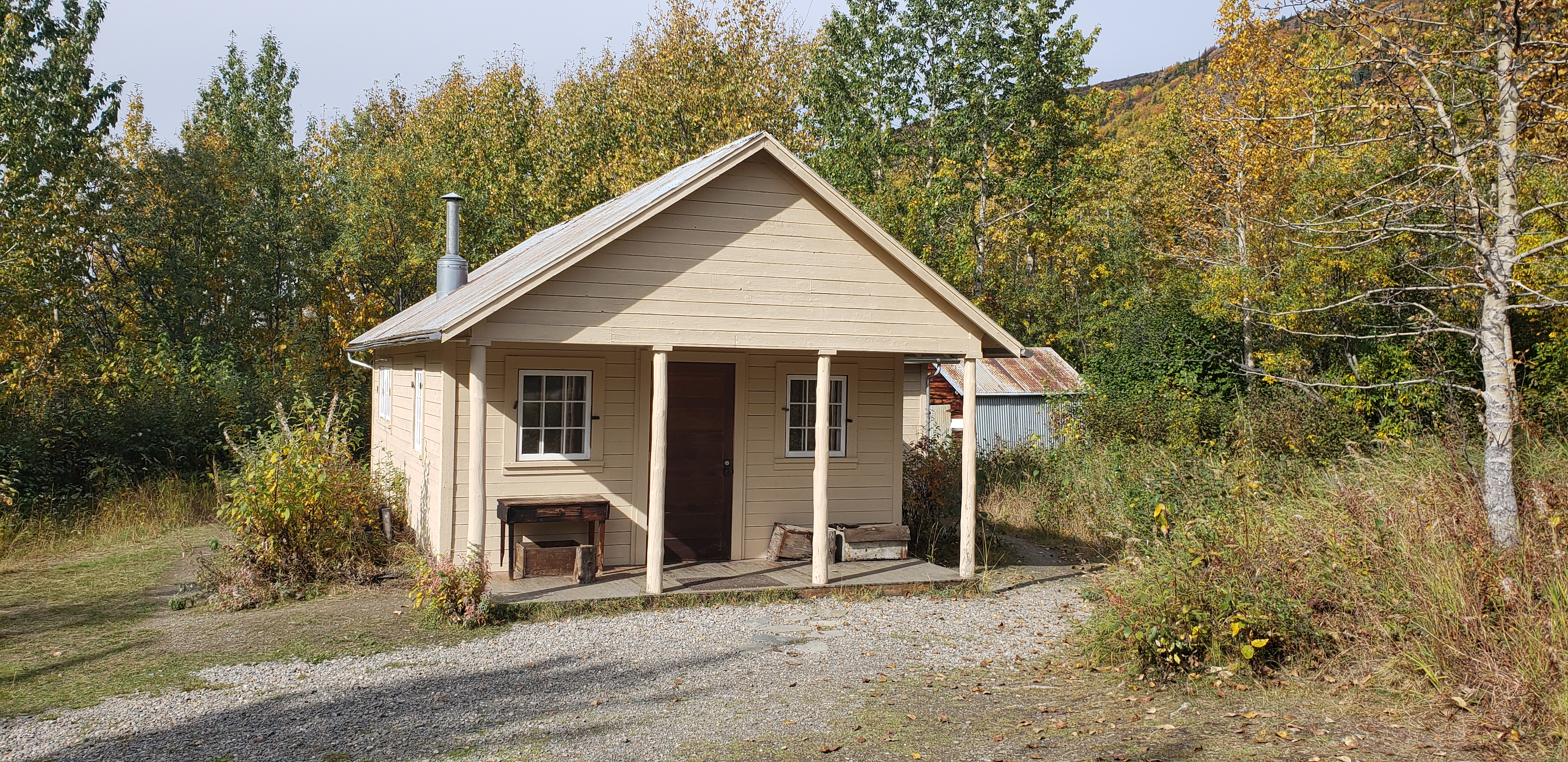
Fannie Quigley home

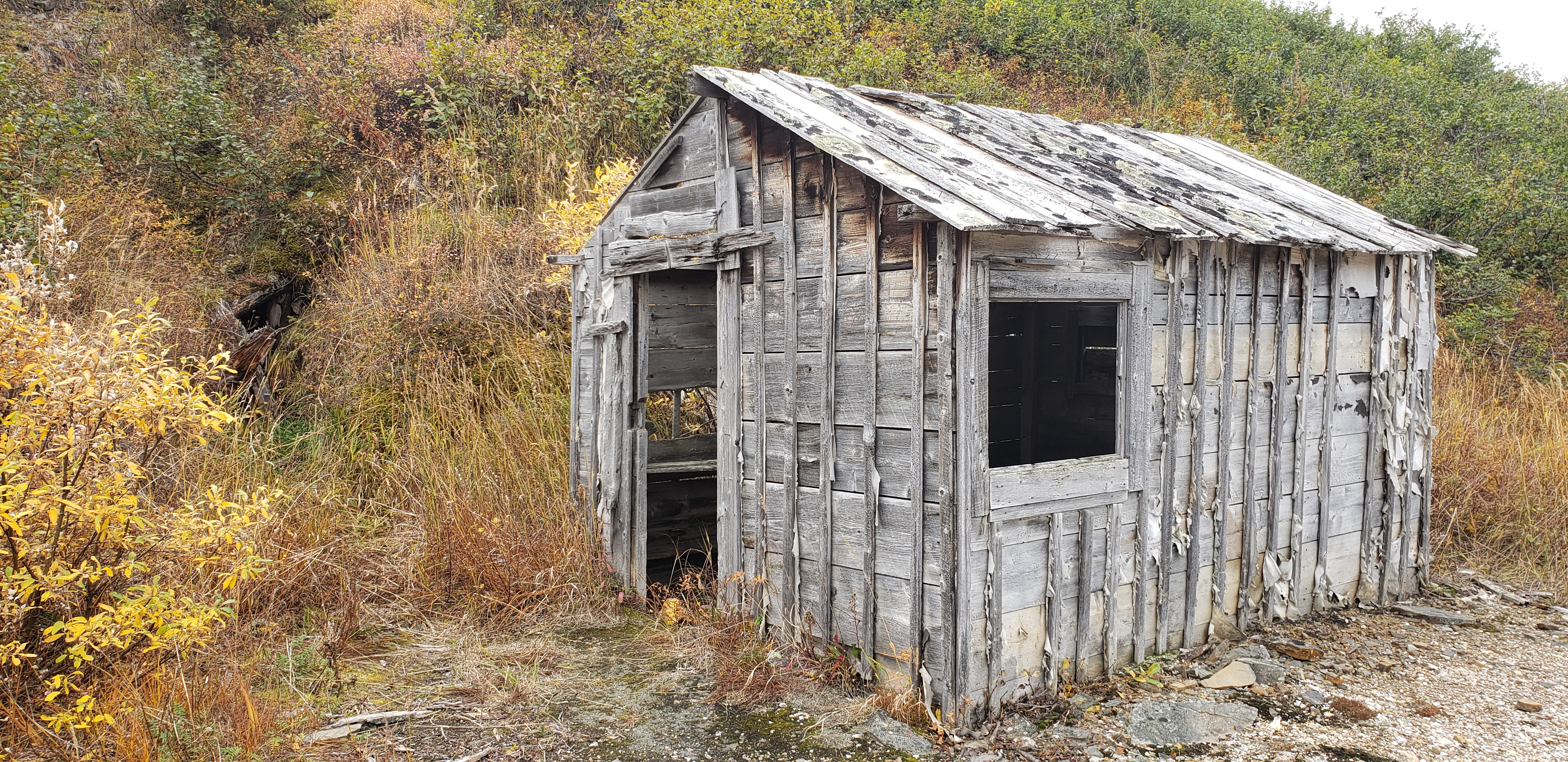
Little Annie Mine

== Quigley Ridge ==
The ridge between Eureka and Friday Creeks became known as Quigley Ridge, after Joe and Fannie Quigley prospected the area. They filed hard rock claims along this ridge, starting with the Silver Pick Claim in Nov. 1910, while Fannie filed placer claims on Friday and Eureka Creeks, and maintained their claims on Glacier Creek. Fannie acquired the Little Annie Claim in Jan. 1914. The main tunnel of Little Annie intersected a 3–4 foot thick quartz vein 90 feet from the entrance, which outcropped in an open-cut in the above hillside. A 42 foot drift followed the vein. By 1921, Joe Quigley was developing the Red Top Lode, using a 40 foot shaft and a 200 foot drift to follow a vein. Eventually, the mine included 500 feet of tunnel. Ernest R. Fransen and Clifton M. Hawkins then purchased 17 Quigley claims, from which Joe and Fannie received $100,000, and 10% of gross. Fransen and Hawkins formed the Red Top Mining Company, with A. Hjalmer Nordale, which operated from 1935 until 1942, when WWII suspended gold mining. Company operations included a 5 mile access road, an assay shop, bunkhouses, and a blacksmith shop. The ridge also became the site of the Quigley homestead and cabin, from about 1913 until 1939. By then, Joe and Fannie had separated, and Fannie moved closer to the Kantishna airstrip along Moose Creek.
