= Mount Dall =

Mountain in Alaska, United States

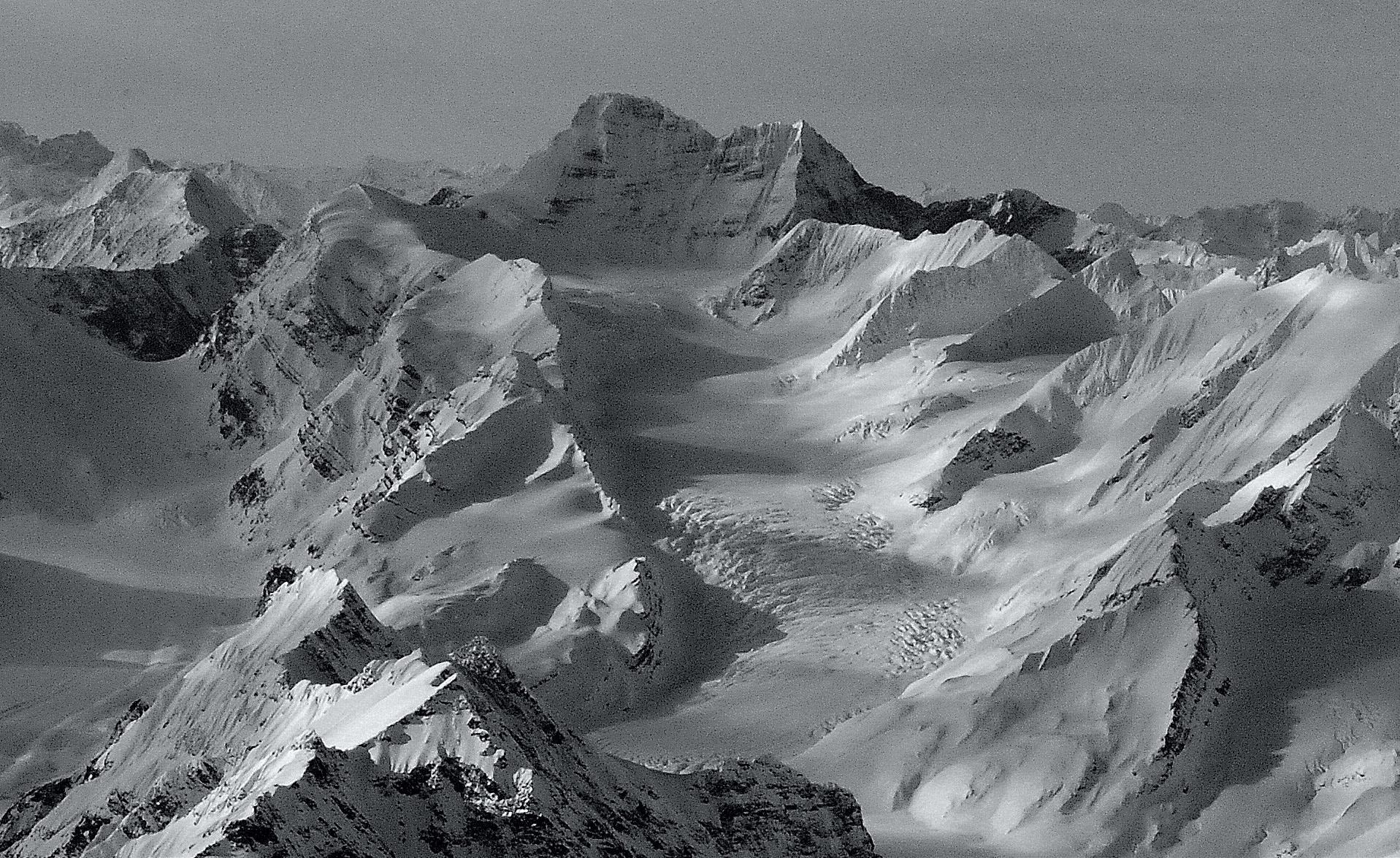
- Aerial view looking west at Mt. Dall

Highest point
- Elevation: 8,399 ft (2,560 m)
- Prominence: 3,920 ft (1,190 m)
- Coordinates: 62°34′45″N 152°17′40″W

Geography
- Location within Alaska
- Location: Matanuska-Susitna Borough, Alaska, United States
- Parent range: Alaska Range
- Topo map: USGS Talkeetna C-5

Mount Dall is a 8,399-foot (2,560 m) mountain in the Alaska Range, in Denali National Park and Preserve, southwest of Denali. Mount Dall was named in 1902 by A.H. Brooks of the U.S. Geological Survey after naturalist and Alaska explorer William Healey Dall.

== See also ==
- Mountain peaks of Alaska
