= Denali Park (CDP), Alaska =

Census-designated place in the United States

Denali Park, Alaska
- Census-designated place
- Street view

- Location in Denali Borough and the state of Alaska.
- Coordinates: 63°39′5″N 148°49′20″W
- Country: United States
- State: Alaska
- Borough: Denali

Government
  - Borough mayor: Christopher Noel
  - State senator: George Rauscher (R)
  - State rep.: Kevin McCabe (R)

Area
  - Total: 176.54 sq mi (457.23 km^{2})
  - Land: 176.29 sq mi (456.60 km^{2})
  - Water: 0.24 sq mi (0.62 km^{2})
- Elevation: 1,749 ft (533 m)

Population (2020)
  - Total: 163
  - Density: 0.93/sq mi (0.36/km^{2})
- Time zone: UTC-9 (Alaska (AKST))
  - Summer (DST): UTC-8 (AKDT)
- Area code: 907
- FIPS code: 02-18805
- GNIS feature ID: 1423625

Denali Park, formerly McKinley Park, is a census-designated place (CDP) in Denali Borough, in the U.S. state of Alaska. As of the 2020 census, the population of the CDP was 163, down from 185 at the 2010 census.

== Geography ==
Denali Park is located at 63°39′5″N 148°49′20″W (63.651444, -148.822322). It is in the valley of the Nenana River along the eastern edge of Denali National Park and Preserve. The park's main visitor center is located along the main road into the park, just to the west of the CDP's limits. The George Parks Highway (Alaska Route 3) is the main road through the CDP: Anchorage is 231 miles (372 km) to the south, and Fairbanks is 128 miles (206 km) to the north.

According to the United States Census Bureau, the Denali Park CDP has a total area of 176.5 square miles (457.2 km^{2}), of which 176.3 square miles (456.6 km^{2}) is land and 0.2 square miles (0.6 km^{2}), or 0.14%, is water.

=== Climate ===
Denali Park has a subarctic climate (Dfc) like most of Alaska. Summer days are mild with nights being brisk. Winters are severely cold with extremely heavy annual snowfall averaging 76.7 inches (195 cm). Most of Denali Park's precipitation occurs during the months of June - September.

Climate data for Denali Park HQ, Alaska, 1991–2020 normals, extremes 1921–present
Month	Jan	Feb	Mar	Apr	May	Jun	Jul	Aug	Sep	Oct	Nov	Dec	Year
Record high °F (°C)	52 (11)	52 (11)	56 (13)	67 (19)	81 (27)	91 (33)	88 (31)	88 (31)	82 (28)	69 (21)	56 (13)	52 (11)	91 (33)
Mean maximum °F (°C)	38.6 (3.7)	41.1 (5.1)	41.9 (5.5)	55.1 (12.8)	70.5 (21.4)	79.7 (26.5)	80.0 (26.7)	75.7 (24.3)	64.0 (17.8)	52.1 (11.2)	38.2 (3.4)	38.3 (3.5)	82.6 (28.1)
Mean daily maximum °F (°C)	11.1 (−11.6)	17.3 (−8.2)	25.6 (−3.6)	39.4 (4.1)	54.4 (12.4)	65.0 (18.3)	66.7 (19.3)	60.9 (16.1)	50.2 (10.1)	31.6 (−0.2)	16.5 (−8.6)	14.9 (−9.5)	37.8 (3.2)
Daily mean °F (°C)	3.1 (−16.1)	7.6 (−13.6)	13.4 (−10.3)	27.9 (−2.3)	42.8 (6.0)	52.8 (11.6)	55.6 (13.1)	50.6 (10.3)	40.4 (4.7)	22.9 (−5.1)	8.9 (−12.8)	6.9 (−13.9)	27.7 (−2.4)
Mean daily minimum °F (°C)	−4.9 (−20.5)	−2.1 (−18.9)	1.2 (−17.1)	16.4 (−8.7)	31.2 (−0.4)	40.6 (4.8)	44.6 (7.0)	40.4 (4.7)	30.6 (−0.8)	14.2 (−9.9)	1.3 (−17.1)	−1.2 (−18.4)	17.7 (−7.9)
Mean minimum °F (°C)	−33.5 (−36.4)	−27.1 (−32.8)	−21.9 (−29.9)	−3.9 (−19.9)	19.3 (−7.1)	31.4 (−0.3)	35.8 (2.1)	29.8 (−1.2)	16.1 (−8.8)	−3.0 (−19.4)	−18.5 (−28.1)	−26.2 (−32.3)	−36.2 (−37.9)
Record low °F (°C)	−52 (−47)	−54 (−48)	−47 (−44)	−33 (−36)	−14 (−26)	19 (−7)	23 (−5)	17 (−8)	−6 (−21)	−24 (−31)	−37 (−38)	−54 (−48)	−54 (−48)
Average precipitation inches (mm)	0.61 (15)	0.71 (18)	0.51 (13)	0.43 (11)	0.84 (21)	2.42 (61)	3.12 (79)	3.01 (76)	1.74 (44)	0.84 (21)	0.84 (21)	0.83 (21)	15.90 (404)
Average snowfall inches (cm)	9.0 (23)	8.4 (21)	6.8 (17)	6.1 (15)	3.1 (7.9)	0.1 (0.25)	0.0 (0.0)	0.0 (0.0)	4.7 (12)	9.9 (25)	13.2 (34)	15.4 (39)	76.7 (194.15)
Average extreme snow depth inches (cm)	20.0 (51)	23.4 (59)	24.7 (63)	23.5 (60)	10.4 (26)	0.0 (0.0)	0.0 (0.0)	0.0 (0.0)	3.6 (9.1)	6.6 (17)	12.4 (31)	17.0 (43)	29.8 (76)
Average precipitation days (≥ 0.01 in)	7.6	6.0	4.9	4.0	6.5	12.6	15.6	15.6	11.8	9.7	9.8	9.3	113.4
Average snowy days (≥ 0.1 in)	9.1	7.3	6.2	4.6	1.7	0.0	0.0	0.7	2.1	8.3	11.4	10.5	61.9
Source 1: NOAA
Source 2: National Weather Service

== Demographics ==
Historical population
Census	Pop.	Note	%±
1930	49		—
1940	11		−77.6%
1950	59		436.4%
1960	28		−52.5%
1980	60		—
1990	171		185.0%
2000	142		−17.0%
2010	185		30.3%
2020	163		−11.9%
U.S. Decennial Census

Denali Park, then known as McKinley Park, first reported on the 1930 U.S. Census as an unincorporated village. It continued to report until 1960. It did not report in 1970. It has returned in every census since 1980, when it was made a census-designated place (CDP). With the restoration of the name of Mount McKinley to Denali made official in 2015, McKinley Park's name was changed to Denali Park.

As of the census of 2000, there were 142 people, 72 households, and 31 families residing in the CDP. The population density was 0.8 inhabitants per square mile (0.31/km^{2}). There were 167 housing units at an average density of 1 per square mile (0.4/km^{2}). The racial makeup of the CDP was 92.96% White, 0.70% Native American, 2.82% from other races, and 3.52% from two or more races. Hispanic or Latino of any race were 1.41% of the population.

There were 72 households, out of which 15.3% had children under the age of 18 living with them, 40.3% were married couples living together, 2.8% had a female householder with no husband present, and 55.6% were non-families. 41.7% of all households were made up of individuals, and 1.4% had someone living alone who was 65 years of age or older. The average household size was 1.97 and the average family size was 2.78.

In the CDP, the population was spread out, with 16.9% under the age of 18, 3.5% from 18 to 24, 43.0% from 25 to 44, 33.1% from 45 to 64, and 3.5% who were 65 years of age or older. The median age was 41 years. For every 100 females, there were 153.6 males. For every 100 females age 18 and over, there were 145.8 males.

The median income for a household in the CDP was $53,750, and the median income for a family was $64,583. Males had a median income of $56,250 versus $31,250 for females. The per capita income for the CDP was $27,255. About 8.6% of families and 11.5% of the population and 8.6% of families were below the poverty line, including 32.0% of those under the age of 18 and none of those 65 and older.

== Images ==
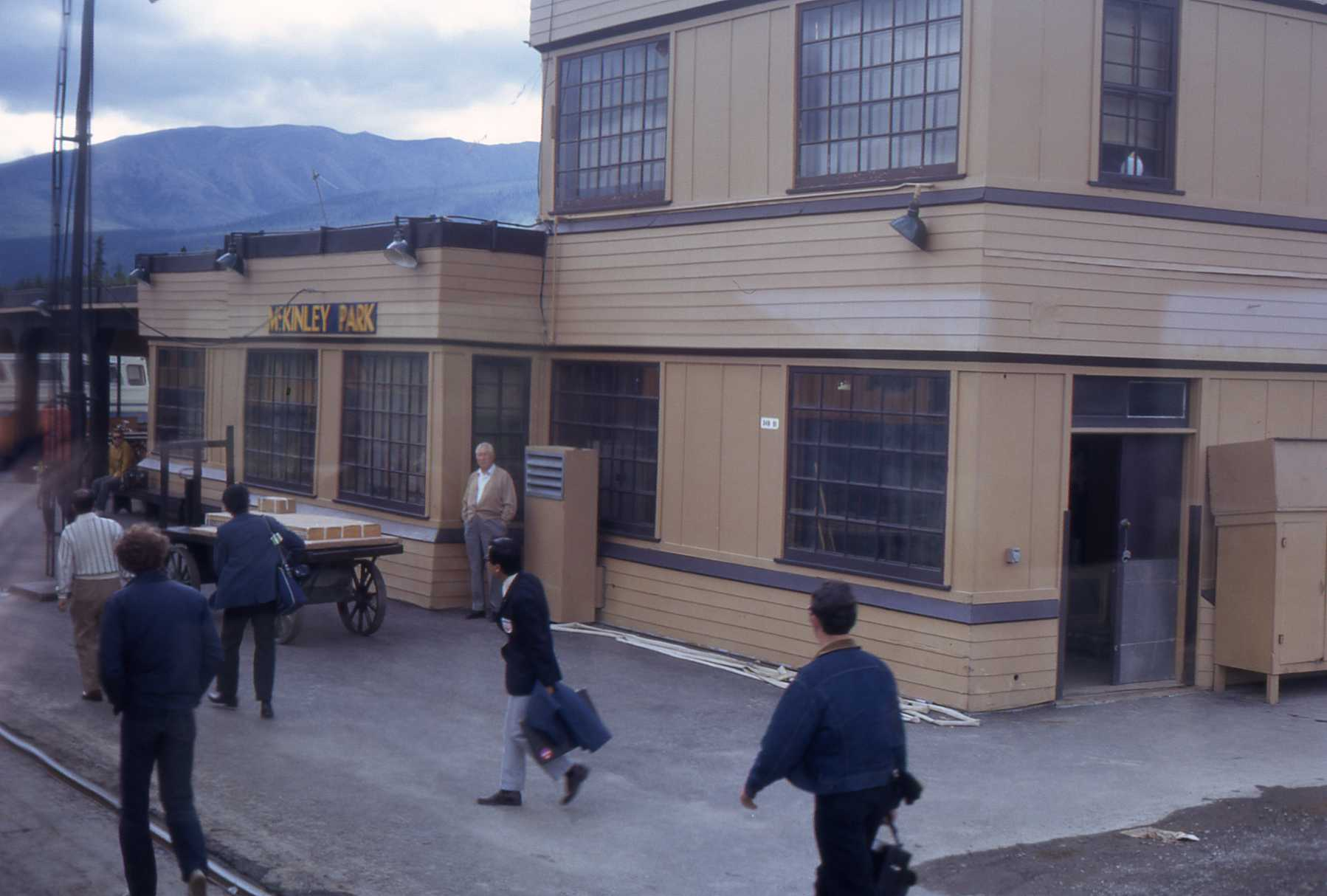
The train station in Denali Park, Alaska

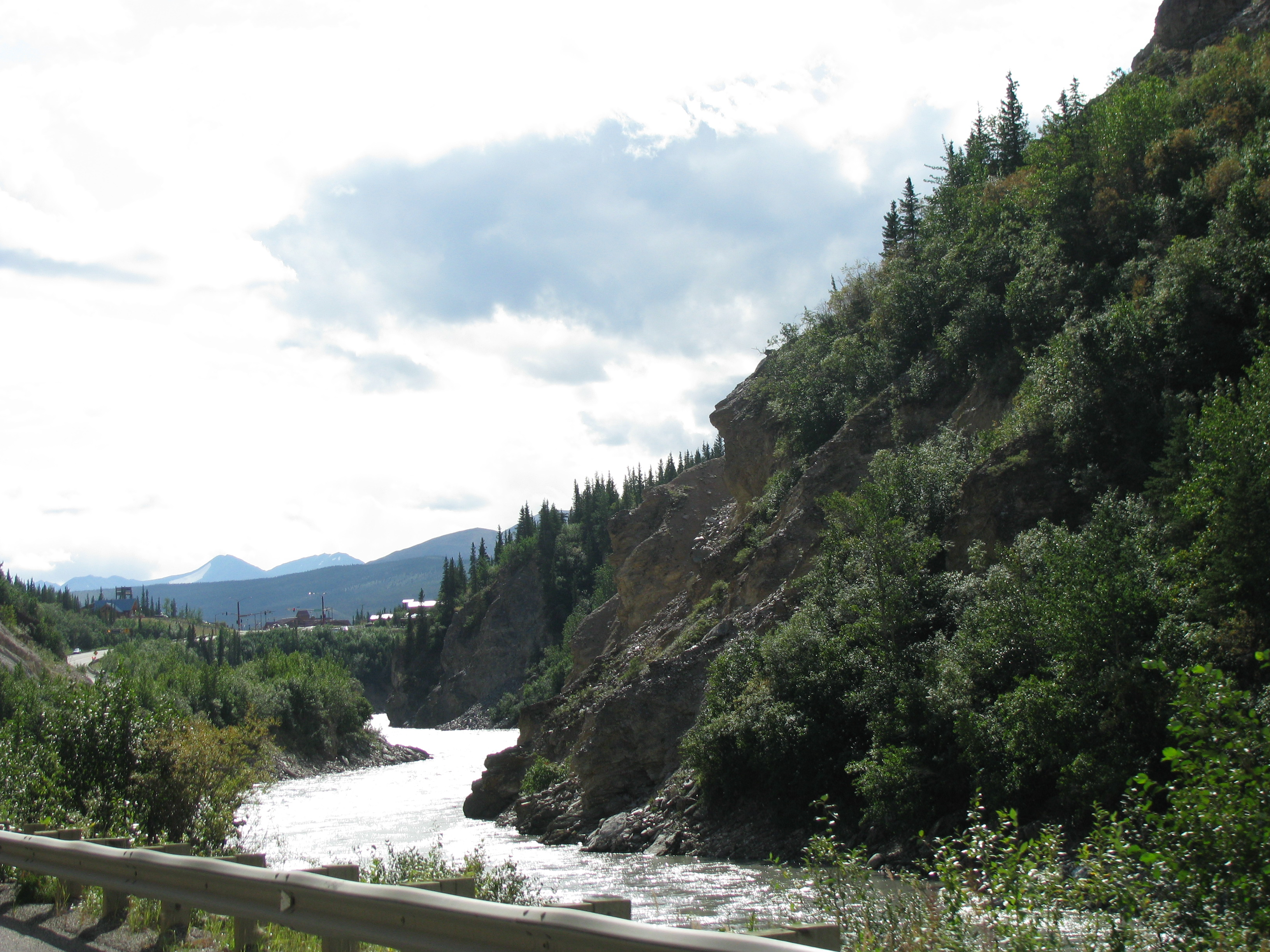
The banks of the Nenana River in Denali Park

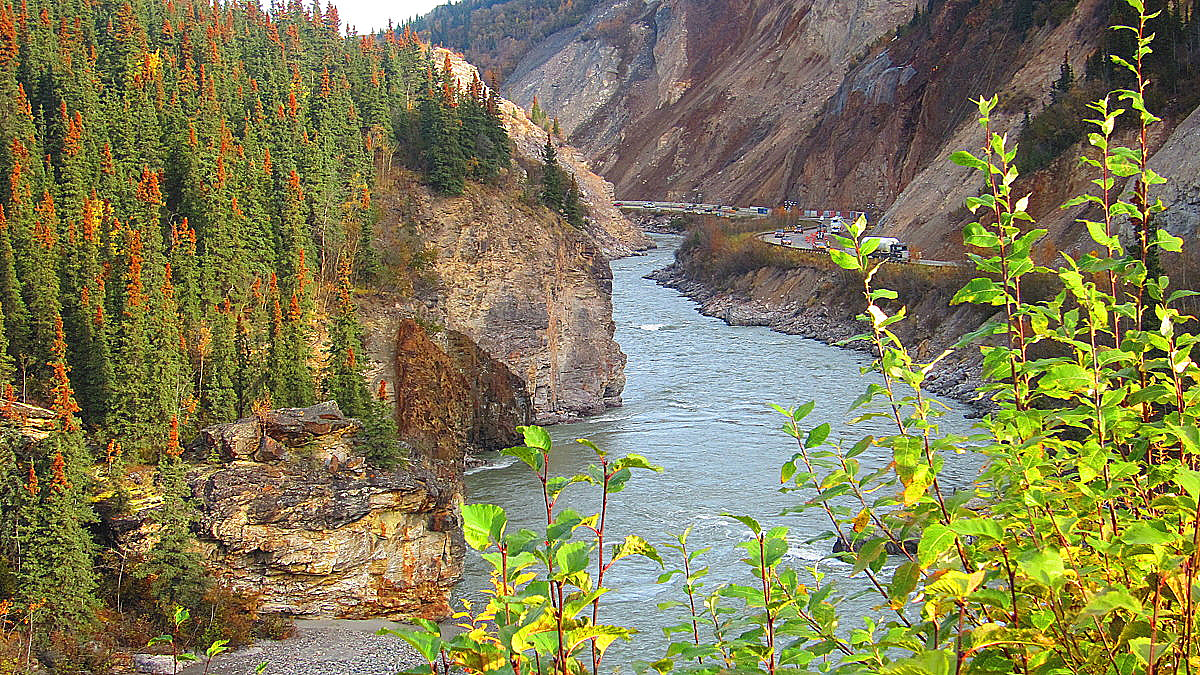
George Parks Highway at the Nenana River in Denali Park

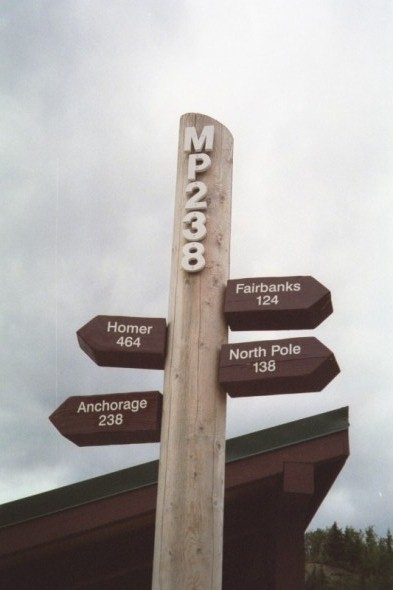
Milepost 238 in Denali Park
