= Denali National Park and Preserve =

National park in Alaska, US

- IUCN category V (protected landscape/seascape)
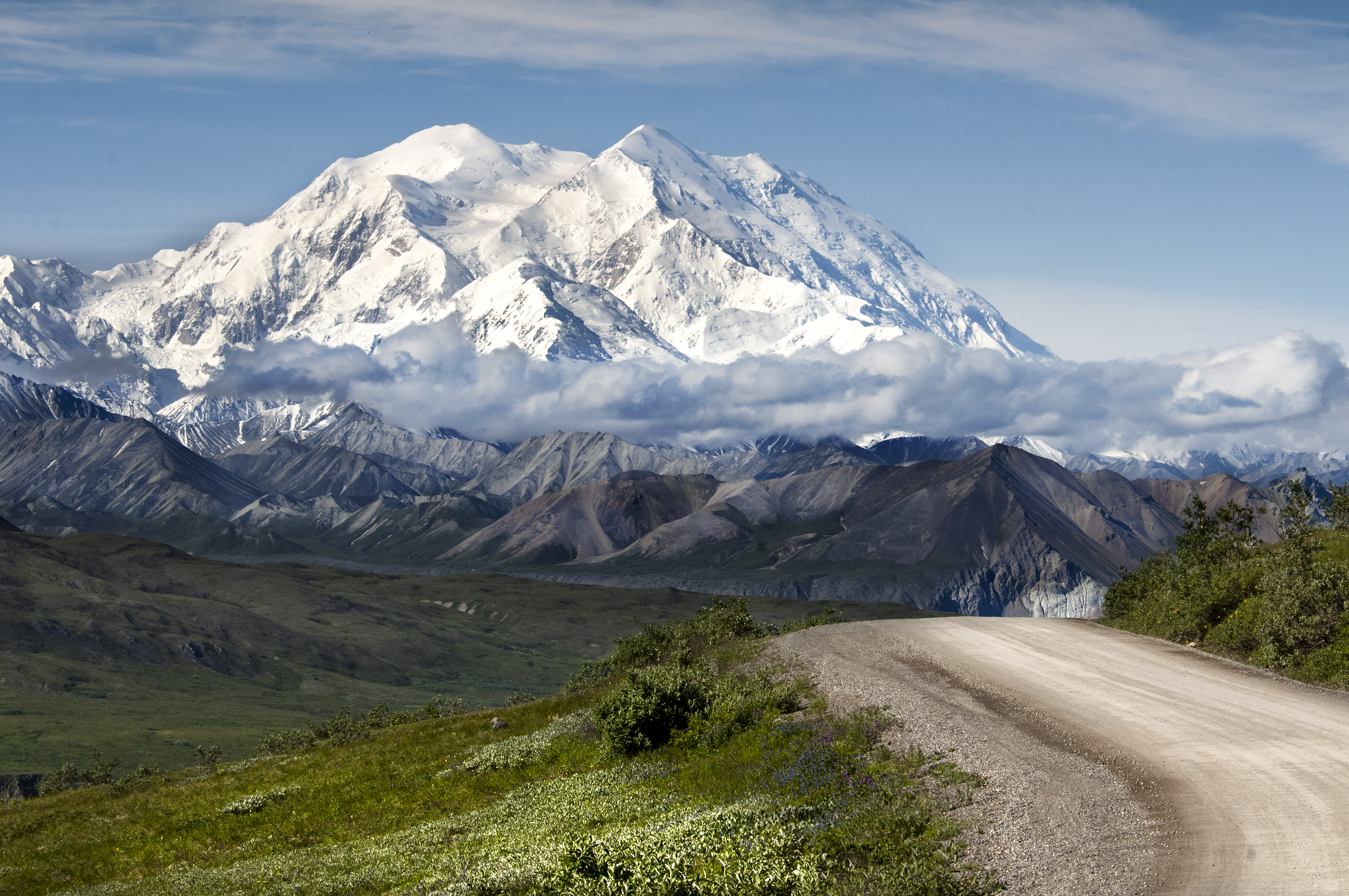
- Denali is the tallest peak in North America.

- Location within Alaska Location within North America
- Location: Denali Borough and Matanuska-Susitna Borough, Alaska, United States
- Nearest city: Healy
- Coordinates: 63.43°N 150.32°W
- Area: 4,740,911 acres (19,185.79 km^{2}) (park) and 1,304,242 acres (5,278.08 km^{2}) (preserve)
- Established: February 26, 1917
- Visitors: 543,300 (in 2025)
- Governing body: National Park Service
- Website: nps.gov/dena

Denali National Park and Preserve, formerly known as Mount McKinley National Park, is a United States national park and preserve located in Interior Alaska, centered on Denali, the highest mountain in North America. The park and contiguous preserve encompass 6,045,153 acres (2,446,387 ha; 9,446 sq mi; 24,464 km^{2}) which is larger than the state of New Hampshire. On December 2, 1980, 2,146,580 acres (3,354 sq mi; 8,687 km^{2}) of Mount McKinley's Wilderness was established within the park. Denali's landscape is a mix of forest at the lowest elevations, including deciduous taiga, with tundra at middle elevations, and glaciers, snow, and bare rock at the highest elevations. The longest glacier is Kahiltna Glacier. Wintertime activities include dog sledding, cross-country skiing, and snowmobiling. The park received 543,300 recreational visitors in 2025.

== History ==
=== Prehistory and protohistory ===
Human habitation in the Denali Region extends back more than 11,000 years, with documented sites just outside the park boundaries dating back more than 8,000 years. However, relatively few archaeological sites have been documented within the park boundaries, owing to the region's high elevation, harsh winter conditions, and scarce resources compared to lower elevations. The oldest site within park boundaries is the Teklanika River site, dated to about 7130 BC. More than 84 archaeological sites have been documented within the park. The sites are typically characterized as hunting camps rather than settlements and provide little cultural context. The presence of Athabaskan peoples in the region is dated to 1,500 - 1,000 years before present on linguistic and archaeological evidence, while researchers have proposed that Athabaskans may have inhabited the area for thousands of years before then. The principal groups in the park area in the last 500 years include the Koyukon, Tanana, and Dena'ina people.

=== Establishment of the park ===
In 1906, conservationist Charles Alexander Sheldon proposed preserving the Denali region as a national park. He presented the plan to his co-members of the Boone and Crockett Club. They decided that the political climate at the time was unfavorable for congressional action and that the best hope of success rested on the approval and support of the Alaskans themselves. Sheldon wrote, "The first step was to secure the approval and cooperation of the delegate who represented Alaska in Congress."

In October 1915, Sheldon took up the matter with E. W. Nelson of the Biological Survey at Washington, D.C., and with George Bird Grinnell, to introduce a suitable bill in the coming session of Congress. The matter was then presented to the Game Committee of the Boone and Crockett Club and, after a full discussion, the committee endorsed it.

On December 3, 1915, the plan was presented to Alaska's delegate, James Wickersham, who, after some deliberation, gave his approval. The plan was then presented to the executive committee of the Boone and Crockett Club and, on December 15, 1915, was unanimously accepted. The plan was thereupon endorsed by the club and presented to Stephen Mather, Assistant Secretary of the Interior in Washington, D.C., who immediately approved it.

The bill was introduced in April 1916 by Delegate Wickersham in the House and by Senator Key Pittman of Nevada in the Senate. Much lobbying took place the following year, and on February 19, 1917, the bill passed. On February 26, 1917, 11 years after its conception, the bill was signed into law by President Woodrow Wilson, thereby creating Mount McKinley National Park.

A portion of Denali, excluding the summit, was included in the original park boundary. The boundary was expanded in 1922 and again in 1932 and 1947 to include the area of the hotel and railroad.

On Thanksgiving Day in 1921, the Mount McKinley Park Hotel opened. In July 1923, President Warren Harding stopped at McKinley Park Station, site of the Mount McKinley Park Hotel, while touring the length of the Alaska Railroad as part of his Voyage of Understanding tour; he drove a golden spike marking the railroad's completion at Nenana on July 15, 1923. The flat-roofed, two-story log building had open balconies, glazed windows, and electric lighting. Inside were about two dozen guest rooms along with a store, lunch counter, kitchen, and storeroom. Guests in the 1930s reported vermin, soiled linen, drafty rooms, and poor food. The hotel closed later that decade as trade shifted to lodgings deeper in the park, such as Savage Camp. After being abandoned for many years, the hotel was destroyed in 1972 by a fire.

Fourteen log cabins were built in the late 1920s and early 1930s as a network of shelters for patrolling park rangers throughout the park. They were listed in the National Register of Historic Places in 1986.

The 93 mi (150 km) Park Road was completed in 1938 after 17 years of construction.

There was no road access to the park entrance until 1957, when the Denali Highway opened; park attendance greatly expanded: there were 5,000 visitors in 1956 and 25,000 visitors by 1958. In 1971, the George Parks Highway, under piecemeal construction for several years, was completed, providing direct highway connections to Anchorage and Fairbanks. Visitation doubled to 88,000 from 1971 to 1972. With the increase in visitors, the park closed most of the Park Road that year to private vehicles and required visitors to take shuttle buses.

In 1967, the park was the site of one of the deadliest mountaineering accidents in the United States with the Mount McKinley disaster, where seven climbers died in an intense blizzard on Denali. The Park Service debated closing the mountain to climbing in the wake of the accident, but ultimately decided to keep it open.

The park was designated an international biosphere reserve in 1976. The surrounding Denali National Monument was proclaimed by President Jimmy Carter on December 1, 1978, and was combined with the park in 1980.

=== Naming dispute ===
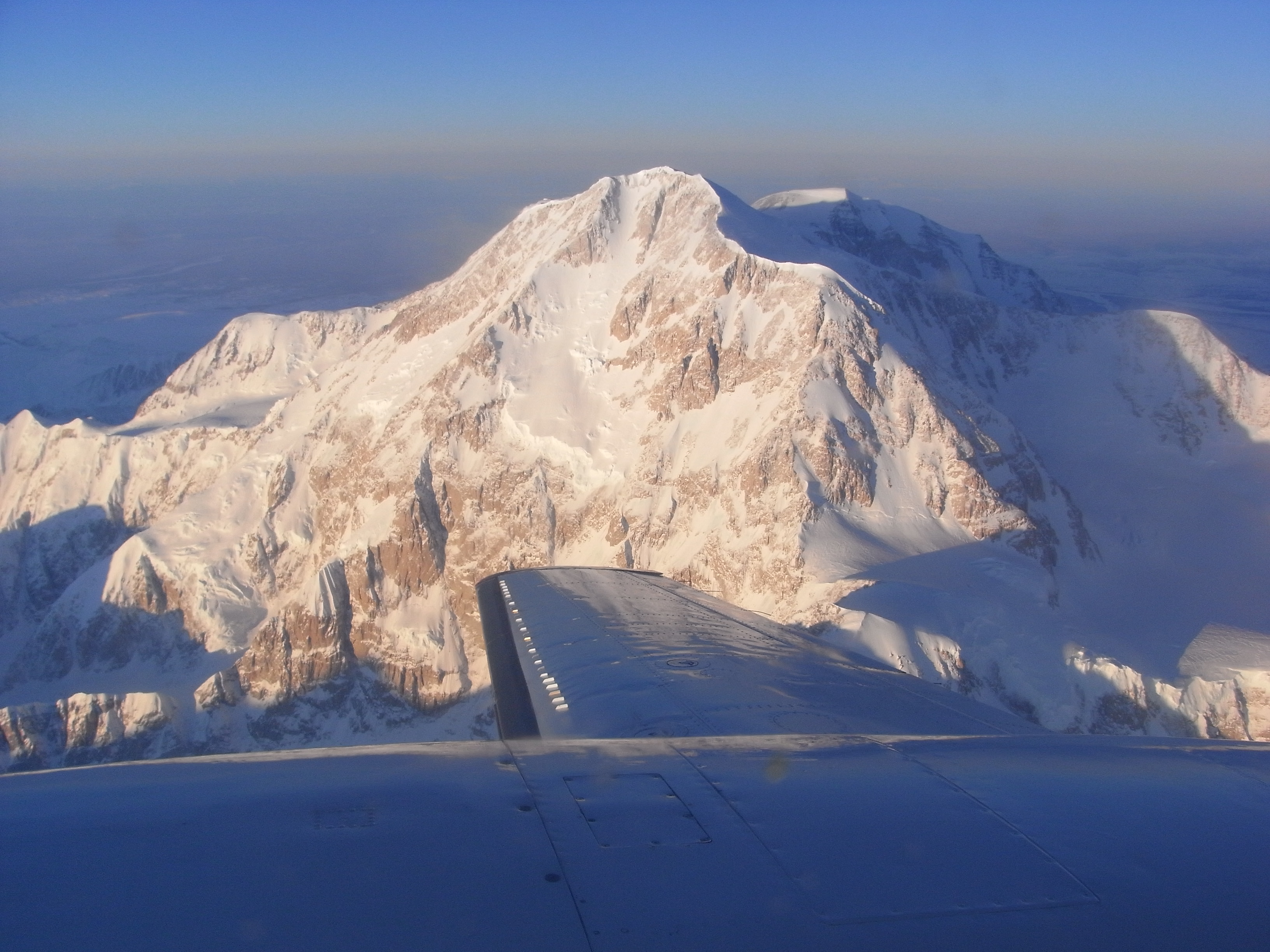
Aerial view of Denali's summit

The name of Mount McKinley National Park was subject to local criticism from the beginning. The word Denali means "the high one" in the native Athabaskan language and refers to the mountain itself. The mountain was named after the newly elected US president, William McKinley, in 1897 by local prospector William A. Dickey. The United States government formally adopted the name Mount McKinley after President Wilson signed the bill creating Mount McKinley National Park in 1917. In 1980, Mount McKinley National Park was combined with Denali National Monument, and the Alaska National Interest Lands Conservation Act named the combined unit the Denali National Park and Preserve. At that time, the Alaska State Board of Geographic Names changed the mountain's name to Denali. However, the U.S. Board on Geographic Names did not recognize the change and continued to use the official name, Mount McKinley. This situation lasted until August 30, 2015, when President Barack Obama directed Secretary of the Interior Sally Jewell to rename the mountain to Denali, using statutory authority to act on requests when the Board of Geographic Names does not do so in a "reasonable" period. At the beginning of his second term, President Donald Trump signed an executive order to revert the name of the mountain to Mount McKinley, while explicitly leaving the name of the national park and preserve unchanged. Renaming the park unit itself would likely require an act of Congress, as the U.S. Board on Geographic Names generally lacks authority over federal land units named and established by Congress.

=== Recent decades ===
In 1992, Christopher McCandless ventured into the Alaskan wilderness and settled in an abandoned bus in the park on the Stampede Trail at 63°52′5.96″N 149°46′8.39″W , near Lake Wentitika. He carried little food or equipment and hoped to live for a time in solitude. Almost four months later, McCandless's starved remains were found, weighing only 67 lb (30 kg). His story has been widely publicized via articles, books, and films, and the bus where his remains were found has become a shrine attracting people from around the world.

On November 5, 2012, the United States Mint released the 15th coin of its America the Beautiful Quarters series, which honors Denali National Park. The coin's reverse features a Dall sheep against a background of Denali.

In September 2013, President Barack Obama signed the Denali National Park Improvement Act into law. The statute allows the United States Department of the Interior to "issue permits for microhydroelectric projects in the Kantishna Hills area of the Denali National Park and Preserve in Alaska"; it authorizes the Department of the Interior and a company called Doyon Tourism, Inc. to exchange some land in the area; it authorizes the National Park Service (NPS) to "issue permits to construct a natural gas pipeline in the Denali National Park"; and it renames the existing Talkeetna Ranger Station the Walter Harper Talkeetna Ranger Station. The National Parks Conservation Association supported the bill because the legislation "takes a thoughtful approach to protecting roadless Alaska, promoting renewable energy development, and honoring native Alaskans".

On September 24, 2020, the Museum of The North at the University of Alaska (Fairbanks) announced it became the permanent home of McCandless's 'Magic Bus 142' where it will be restored and an outdoor exhibit will be created.

Effective August 24, 2021, the park's facilities west of Denali Park Road Mile 43 were abruptly closed due to a slow-moving landslide at Polychrome Pass, which made travel unsafe. The Pretty Rocks Landslide had been ongoing for decades, but it had previously moved slowly enough that NPS had kept the road open by pouring in up to 100 truckloads of gravel per week. Melting permafrost caused the rate of movement to accelerate from a few inches per year, prior to 2014, to more than ten inches per day, at which point the pass was closed and all campers staying west of the pass evacuated. A road bridge avoiding the affected area was constructed, and park officials intend to reopen the road in the summer of 2027.

== Geography ==
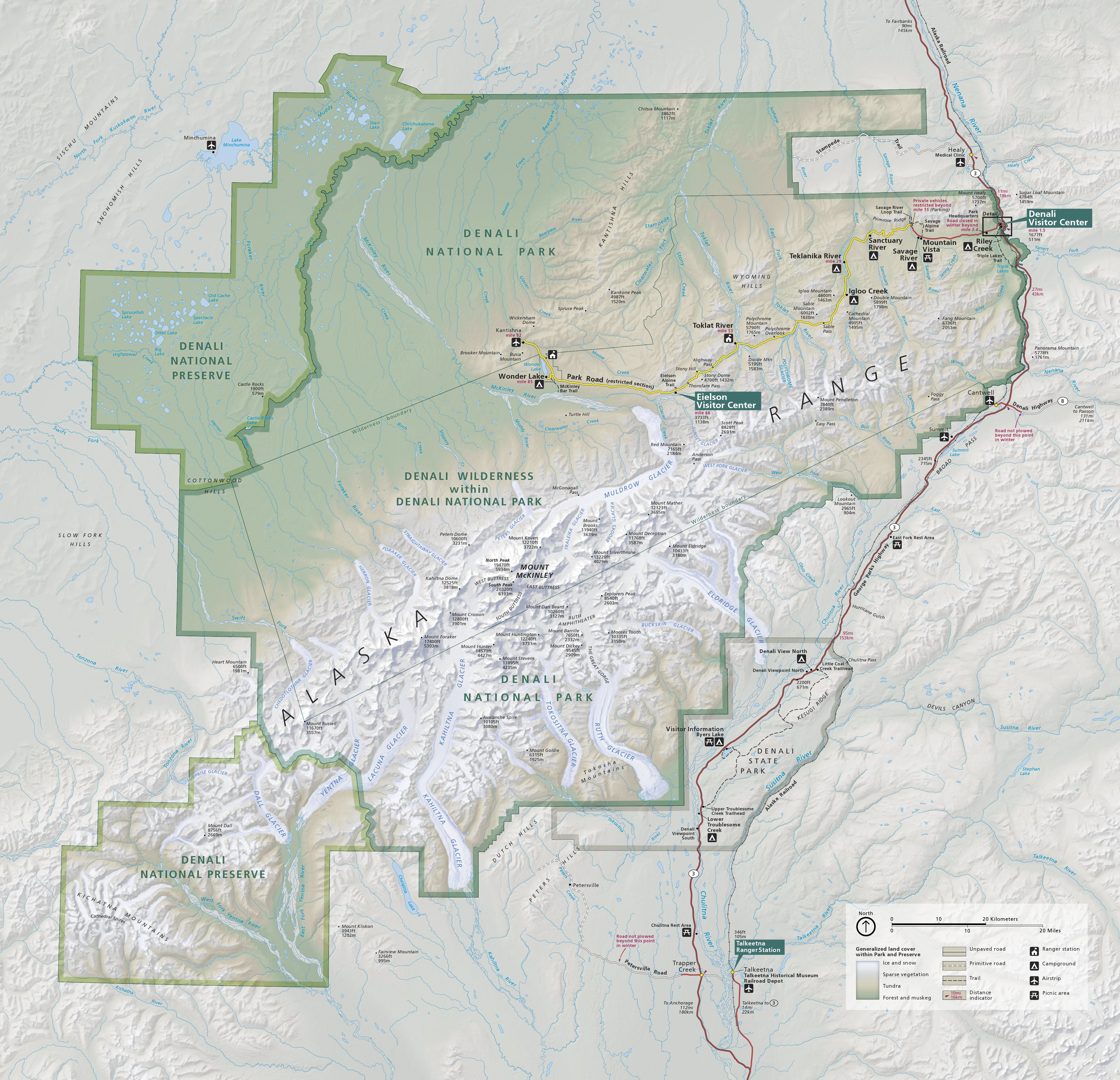
Park map

Denali National Park and Preserve includes the central, highest portion of the Alaska Range, along with many glaciers and glacial valleys that flow southward out of the range. To the north, the park and preserve encompass the valleys of the McKinley, Toklat, and Foraker Rivers, as well as the Kantishna and Wyoming Hills. The George Parks Highway runs along the eastern edge of the park, crossing the Alaska Range at the divide between the valleys of the Chultina River and the Nenana River. The entrance to the park is about 11 mi (18 km) south of Healy. The Denali Visitor Center and the park headquarters are located just inside the entrance. Preserve lands are located on the west side of the park, with one parcel encompassing areas of lakes in the Highpower Creek and Muddy River areas, and the second preserve area covering the southwest end of the Alaska Range around Mount Dall. In contrast to the park, where hunting is prohibited or restricted to subsistence hunting by residents, sport hunting is allowed in the preserve lands. Nikolai, Telida, Lake Minchumina, and Cantwell residents are authorized to hunt inside the park because large portions of these communities historically hunted in the area for subsistence purposes.

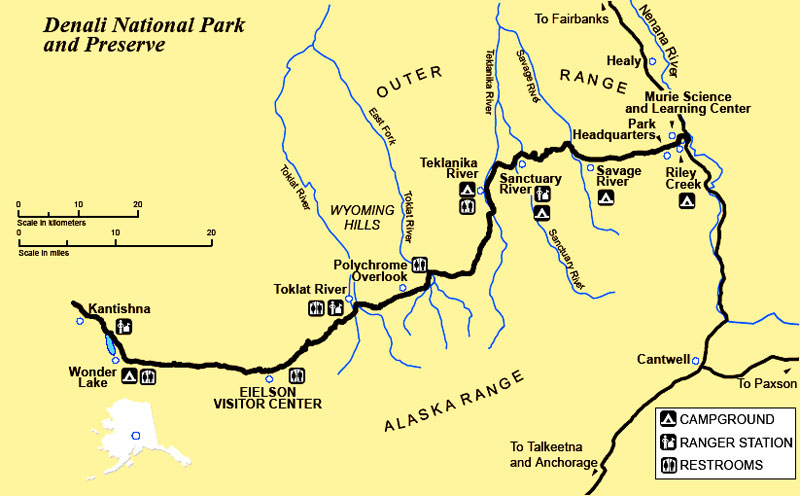
Road map with camping locations, visitor centers, and ranger stations

The size and relative isolation of Denali lead it to generate its own weather. As a consequence, clouds often surround it. Locals sometimes use the phrase "the mountain is out" when it makes an appearance. It is commonly said that only 30 percent of visitors to the park ever actually see Denali. An additional estimate is that only 10 percent of visitors get to see the mountain unobscured from top to bottom. Because the weather patterns are different, Denali is more frequently visible during winter months. The Eielson Visitor Center has an etched outline of the peaks of Denali on the window facing the Denali that shows where the mountain would be if it were visible.

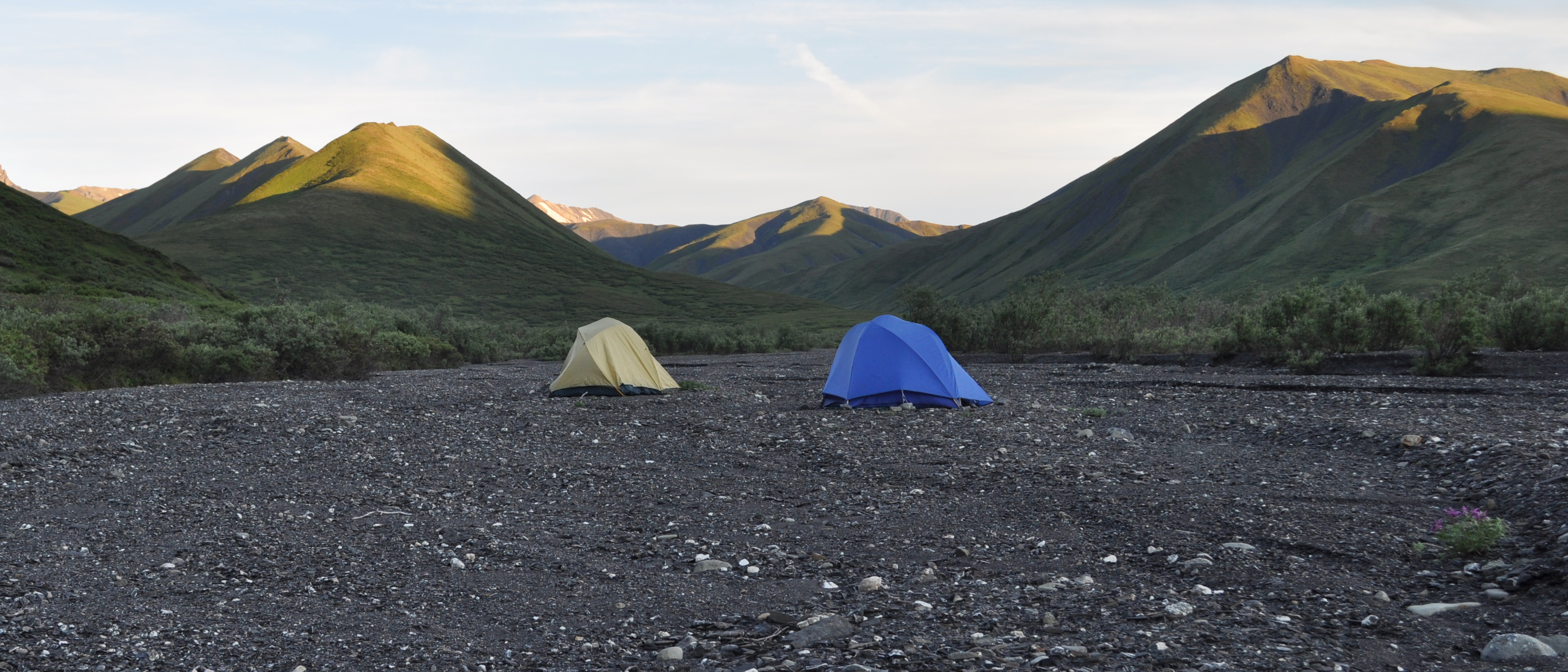
Camping in the Savage River drainage

=== Wilderness ===
The Denali Wilderness is a wilderness area within Denali National Park that protects the higher elevations of the central Alaska Range, including Denali, federally designated as Mount McKinley. The wilderness comprises about one-third of the current national park and preserve—2,146,580 acres (3,354 sq mi; 8,687 km^{2})—which corresponds to the former park boundaries before 1980.

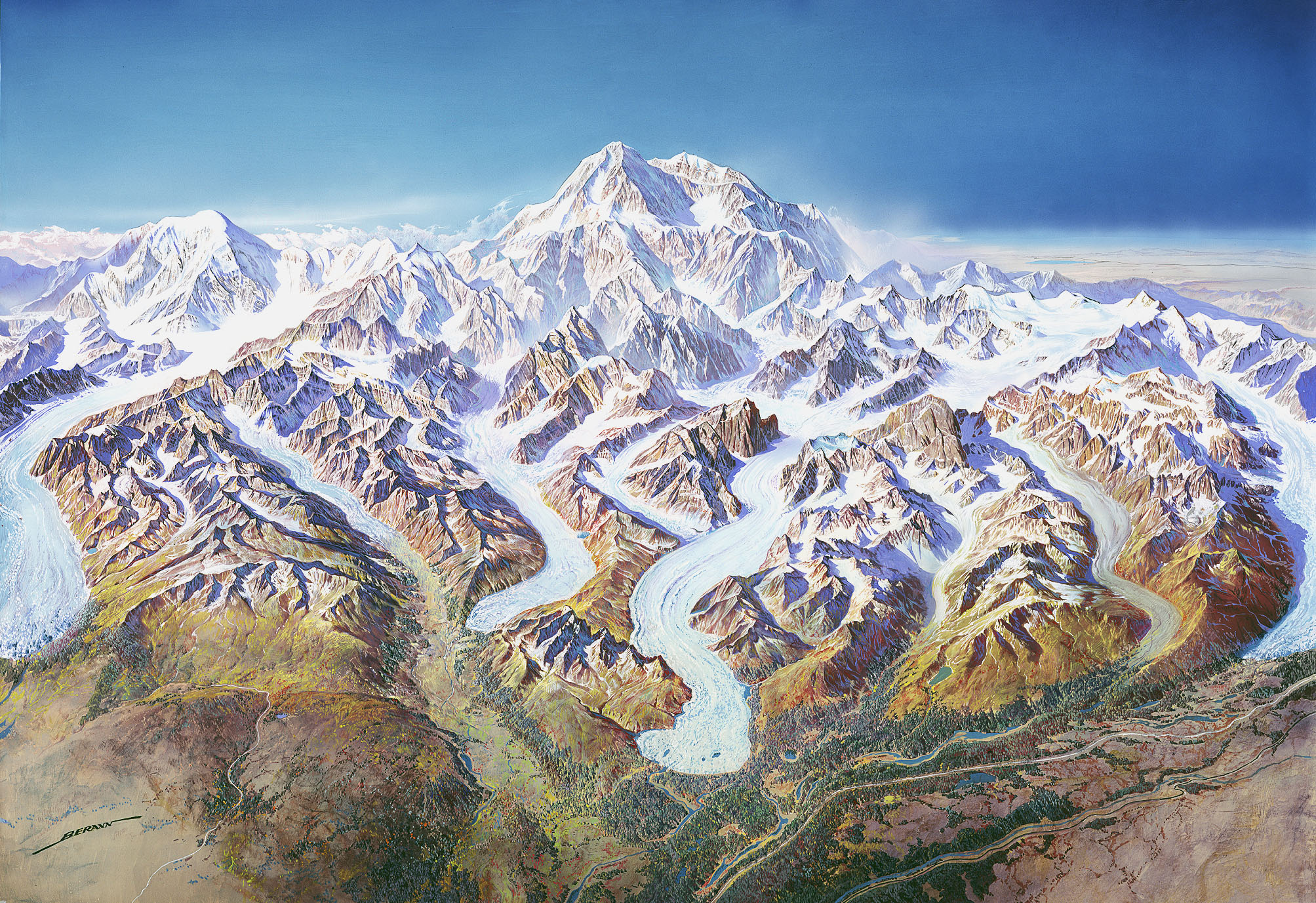
Painting of the heavily glaciated southern part of Denali, looking north-northwest. Mount Foraker is at the left, and Denali, purposely drawn on an exaggerated scale, is featured in the center. Mouse over the painting, and click on an area of interest.

== Geology ==
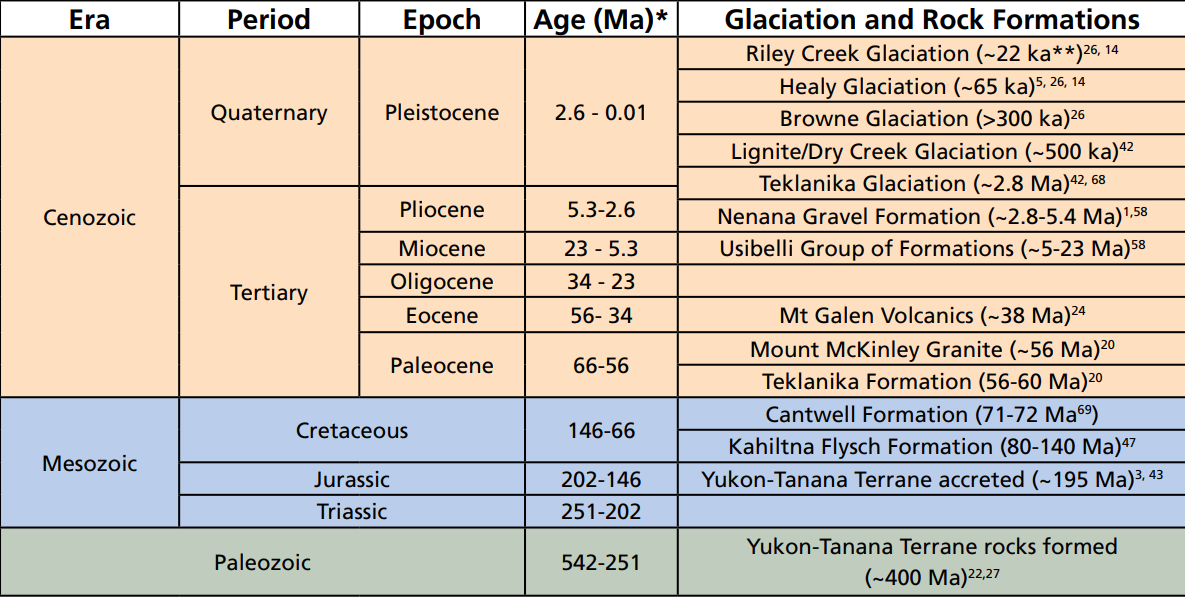
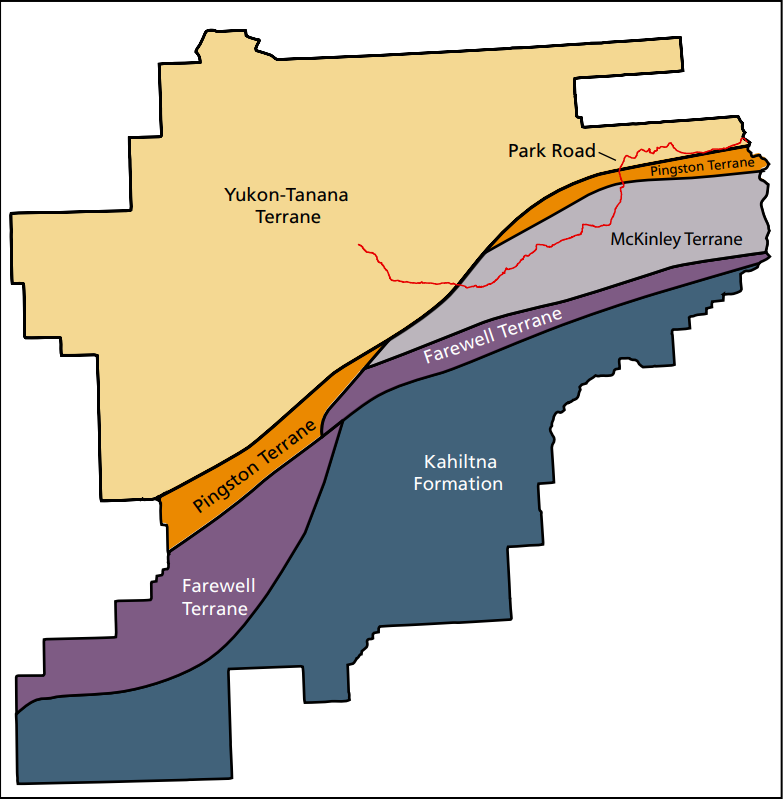
Geologic time scale and geological map of terranes

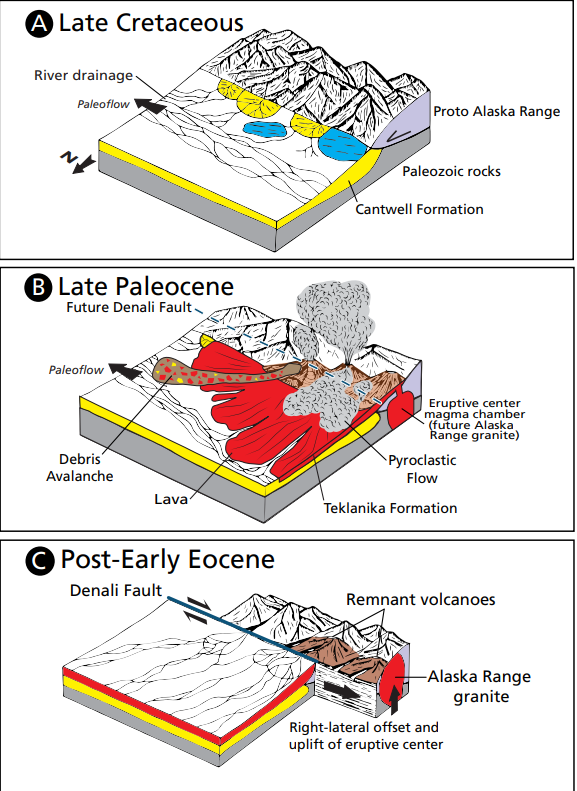
Tectonic history

Denali National Park and Preserve is located in the central Alaska Range, a 600 mi (970 km) arc of mountains stretching from the Alaska–Canada border to the Alaska Peninsula. The park's highest peak is Denali, federally designated as Mount McKinley. Its elevation of 20,310 ft (6,190.5 m), set by a 2015 survey, makes it the highest mountain in North America. Denali stands about 18,000 ft (5,500 m) from base to summit, a greater base-to-summit rise than that of Mount Everest, and has greater relief than most mountains on Earth. It is still rising about 1 mm (0.039 in) each year. The core of the mountain is the biotite granite of the McKinley pluton. Resistant granitic plutons like it are not easily worn away by erosion and weathering, which allows the dominant peaks of the range to stay high compared with mountains of similar age.

The park's geology is the product of collision tectonics. As much as 90% of Alaska's present landmass was not part of the original North American craton. It arrived instead as exotic terranes, fragments of islands, volcanic arcs, marine sediments, oceanic crust, and slivers of other continents that were carried atop tectonic plates and accreted onto the continent. Pervasive faulting has since jumbled the terranes and obscured their chronological order. The oldest is the Yukon-Tanana terrane, made up of Precambrian through Paleozoic metasedimentary and metavolcanic rocks, which underlies the northern part of the park. Its parent sediments were quartz-rich sands and muds laid down in a shallow sea about a billion years ago. Later metamorphism hardened those sands into quartzite, turned mixed sand, mud, and volcanic layers into micaceous schists, gneisses, and phyllites, and recrystallized limy muds into marble. South of the Hines Creek fault, the smaller Pingston, Windy, Dillinger, and McKinley terranes form belts of slate, marble, metamorphosed gabbros, and greenstones (altered basalts). These rocks were deposited in the latter half of the Paleozoic and the early Mesozoic as muds, sands, and fossil debris in a deep ocean basin at tropical latitudes. The McKinley terrane contains Mesozoic flysch and pillow lavas. The Chulitna terrane contains Mesozoic ophiolite rocks, a sequence that indicates oceanic crust was uplifted and thrust onto a continental area, along with chert, volcanic conglomerate, and limestone.

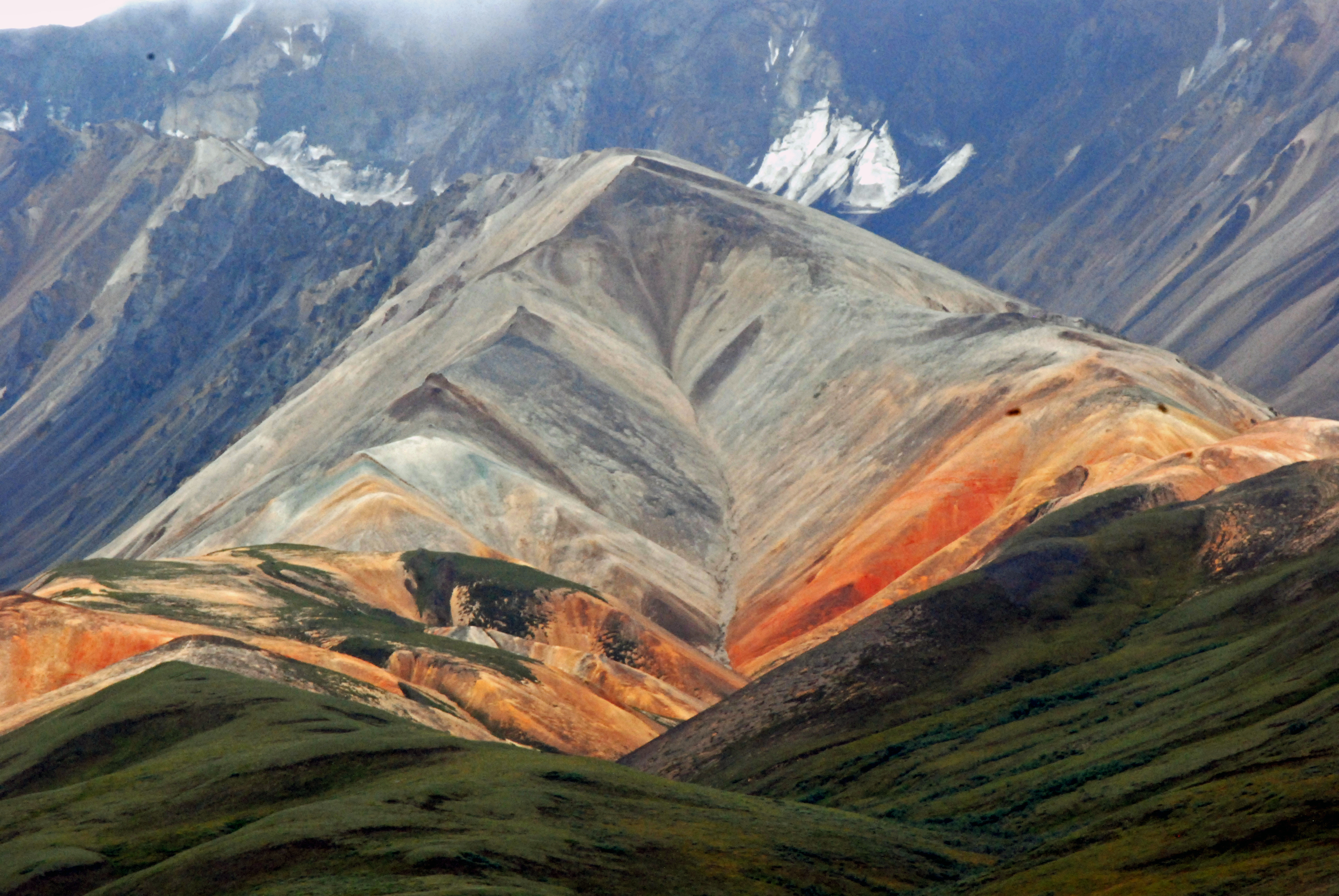
Polychrome Mountain

Some of the youngest rocks in the park include the Kahiltna terrane, a flysch sequence (a sedimentary rock sequence deposited in a marine environment during the early stages of mountain building) formed about 100 million years ago during late Cretaceous time. Another rock sequence is the McKinley Intrusive Sequence, which includes Denali. The Cantwell Volcanics include basalt and rhyolite flows, as well as ash deposits. An example can be seen at Polychrome Pass in the park.

Mesozoic fossils include fossil trackways from therizinosaurids and hadrosaurids in the Cantwell Formation indicate the area was once an immigration point for dinosaurs traveling between Asia and North America during the Late Cretaceous period. Studies of fossil plants from the same formation indicate the area was wet, with marshes and ponds throughout the region.

Denali National Park and Preserve lies in an area of intense tectonic activity. The large-scale Denali Fault system runs the length of the park parallel to the Alaska Range and extends more than 2,100 km (1,300 mi). It is a right-lateral strike-slip fault system made up of the Denali Fault itself, locally split into the Hines Creek and McKinley strands, together with numerous subsidiary faults. More than 600 earthquakes are measured in the park area each year, over 70% of them of magnitude 1.5 to 2.5. On November 3, 2002, a magnitude 7.9 earthquake centered 48 km (30 mi) east of the park caused severe local shaking. The rupture broke the ground surface for 209 mi (336 km) along the Susitna Glacier, Denali, and Totschunda faults, and a magnitude 6.7 shock may have triggered it, the Nenana Mountain earthquake, on the same fault ten days earlier. Because the region is sparsely populated, the earthquake caused no deaths and little structural damage, but it set off thousands of landslides.

=== Glaciers ===
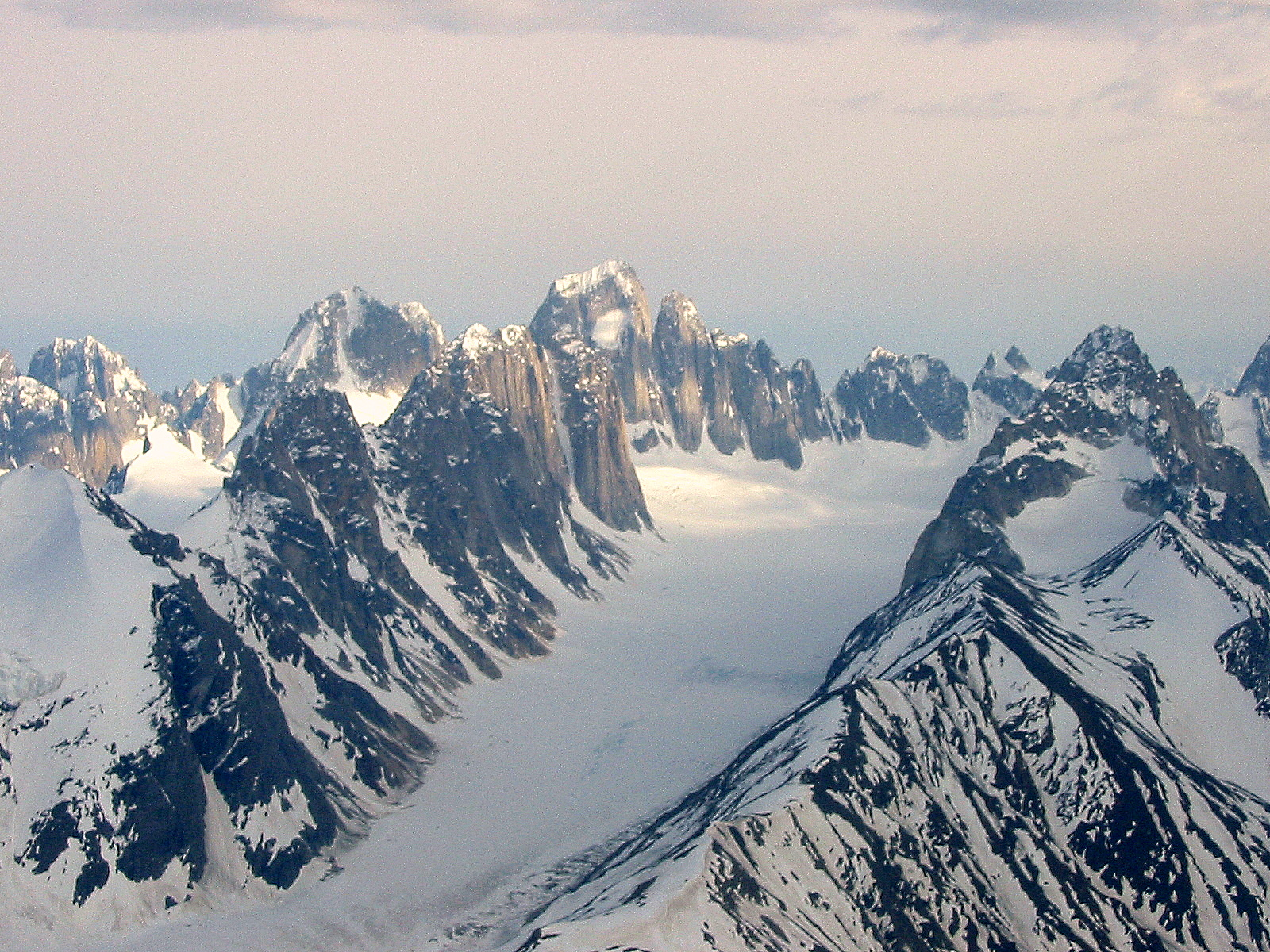
The Kichatna Mountains in the southwestern portion of the preserve

Glaciers cover about 16% of the 6 million acres of Denali National Park and Preserve. Airborne laser altimetry reported by Arendt and colleagues suggested that many of Denali's glaciers were losing up to 6.6 ft (2 m) of water equivalent per year. There are more extensive glaciers on the southeastern side of the range because more snow is dropped on this side from the moisture-bearing winds from the Gulf of Alaska. The Kahiltna Glacier, at 44 miles (71 km), is the longest glacier in the park and in the entire Alaska Range. A reconstruction of its mass balance from 1991 to 2014 put the glacier-wide loss at an average of 0.74 m (2.4 ft) of water equivalent per year. Other large south-facing glaciers include Yentna (20 miles [32 km] long), Tokositna (23 miles [37 km]), Ruth (31 miles [50 km]), and Eldridge (30 miles [48 km]). The Ruth Glacier is 3,800 ft (1,200 m) thick. The Muldrow Glacier (32 miles [51 km] long) lies on the north side of the range. Nonetheless, the northern side has smaller and shorter glaciers overall. Muldrow Glacier has "surged" twice in the last hundred years. Surging means that it has moved forward for a short time at greatly increased speed, due to a build-up of water between the bottom of the glacier and the bedrock channel floating on the ice (due to hydrostatic pressure).

At the upper ends of Denali's glaciers are steep-walled semicircular basins called cirques. Cirques form from freeze-thaw cycles of meltwater in the rocks above the glacier, and glacial erosion and mass wasting occur under the glacier. As cirques on the opposite sides of a ridge are cut deeper into the divide, they form a narrow, sharp, serrated ridge called an arête. As the arête wears away from glacial ice erosion, the low point between cirques is called a col (or, if it is large, a pass). Cols are saddle-shaped depressions in the ridge between cirques. A spire-like sharp peak, the horn, forms when cirques cut back into a mountaintop from three or four sides.

Glaciers deposit rock fragments, but the most notable deposits are the erratics, which are large rock fragments carried some distance from their source and found on glacial terraces and ridge tops throughout Denali. Headquarters erratics are made of granite and can be the size of a house. Some erratics (like those from the Yanert Valley) are located 30 miles (48 km) away from their original location.

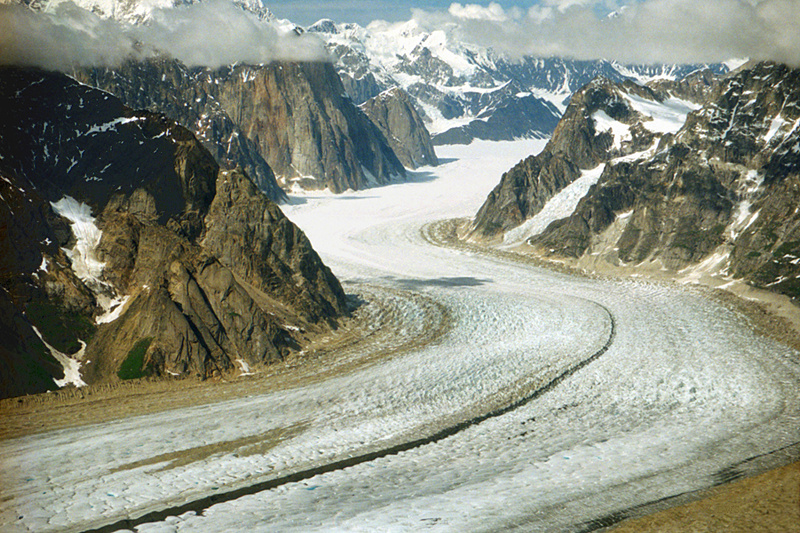
Ruth Glacier and medial moraine - the dark stripe of debris down the middle

Large amounts of rock debris are carried on, in, and beneath the ice as the glaciers move downslope. Lateral moraines are created as debris accumulates as low ridges of till that ride along the edge of the moving glaciers. When lateral moraines adjacent to each other join, they create medial moraines, which are also carried down on the surface of the moving ice.

Braided meltwater streams heavily loaded with rock debris continually shift and intertwine their channels over valley floors. Valley trains form as streams drop quantities of poorly sorted sediment. Valley trains are long, narrow accumulations of glacial outwash, confined by valley walls.

Kettles are formed when glacial retreat and melting are rapid, and blocks of ice are still buried under till. When the ice under the till melts, the till slumps in and forms depressions called kettles. When kettles fill with water, they are known as kettle lakes. Kettle lakes are visible near the Polychrome Overlook, the Teklanika rest stop, and Wonder Lake.

=== Permafrost ===
Permanently frozen ground is known as permafrost. The permafrost is discontinuous in Denali due to differences in vegetation, temperatures, snow cover, and hydrology. The active layer freezing and thawing seasonally can be from 1 in (25 mm) to 10 ft (3 m) thick. The permafrost layer is located between 30 and 100 ft (9 and 30 m) below the active layer. A stand of oddly leaning white spruce growing on a lower slope of Denali is called the Drunken Forest. The trees lean due to soil sliding caused by permafrost freeze-thaw cycles. Permafrost impacts the park's ecosystem by influencing hydrology, vegetation patterns, and wildlife. During the very cold Pleistocene climates, all of Denali was solidly frozen. The northern areas of the range are still frozen due to continued cold temperatures. About 75% of Denali had near-surface permafrost, or an active permafrost layer, in the 1950s. In the 2000s, around 50% of Denali had near-surface permafrost. It is suspected that by the 2050s, only about 6% of surface permafrost will remain. Because of climate change, most of the shallow permafrost is thawing. It is estimated that with an additional 1–2 degrees of warming, most of Denali's permafrost will thaw. Permafrost thaw causes landslides as the ice-rich soil transforms into mud slurry. Landslides have previously impacted accessibility in Denali by obstructing the roads in the park. Permafrost thaw releases additional carbon into the atmosphere.

Thawing of ice-rich permafrost creates thermokarst features. The ground loses the support of its ground ice and subsides irregularly, and the resulting depressions fill with water to form thaw lakes and cave-in lakes.

Pretty Rock Landslide Time-lapse from July 21 to August 25, 2021, in which the road was displaced 6.5 meters

Ice wedges form where the ground cracks as frozen soil contracts in extreme cold. Water later fills the cracks, freezes, and expands, and the cycle repeats each year, enlarging the wedges and jacking the cracks open. Where several wedges join, they outline patterned ground known as ice wedge polygons, examples of which lie about 0.75 mi (1.21 km) south of the park road near Mile 49.

== Climate ==
According to the Köppen climate classification, Denali National Park has a subarctic climate (Dfc). The plant hardiness zone at Denali Visitor Center is 3a with an average annual extreme minimum temperature of −38.9 °F (−39.4 °C).

Long winters are followed by short growing seasons. Nearly 80 percent of the park's bird species are migratory, returning in spring to nest and raise their young. Most mammals and other wildlife in the park spend the brief summer months preparing for winter and raising their young.

Summers are short and warm. June through August are the rainiest months, and average summer temperatures range from 33 to 75 °F (1 to 24 °C). Weather often changes without warning, and although it is rare, snow has been known to fall in any summer month.

The Alaska Range separates two distinct climates within the park. The south side has a transitional maritime climate influenced by the prevailing weather patterns of the Gulf of Alaska, with milder air temperatures, less seasonal variation, and more precipitation. North of the range, the climate is continental, with strong seasonal variation and relatively low precipitation, because the area lies on the leeward side of a major mountain range. The park's northern interior has very warm summers and cold winters.

Climate data for McKinley Park, Alaska, 1991–2020 normals, extremes 1923–present
Month	Jan	Feb	Mar	Apr	May	Jun	Jul	Aug	Sep	Oct	Nov	Dec	Year
Record high °F (°C)	52 (11)	52 (11)	56 (13)	67 (19)	81 (27)	91 (33)	88 (31)	88 (31)	82 (28)	69 (21)	56 (13)	52 (11)	91 (33)
Mean maximum °F (°C)	38.6 (3.7)	41.1 (5.1)	41.9 (5.5)	55.1 (12.8)	70.5 (21.4)	79.7 (26.5)	80.0 (26.7)	75.7 (24.3)	64.0 (17.8)	52.1 (11.2)	38.2 (3.4)	38.3 (3.5)	82.6 (28.1)
Mean daily maximum °F (°C)	10.1 (−12.2)	19.6 (−6.9)	25.1 (−3.8)	40.6 (4.8)	54.9 (12.7)	65.3 (18.5)	66.4 (19.1)	61.1 (16.2)	50.7 (10.4)	33.7 (0.9)	17.6 (−8.0)	13.8 (−10.1)	38.2 (3.5)
Daily mean °F (°C)	2.2 (−16.6)	9.3 (−12.6)	12.5 (−10.8)	28.7 (−1.8)	43.0 (6.1)	53.0 (11.7)	55.5 (13.1)	50.9 (10.5)	40.8 (4.9)	24.7 (−4.1)	9.8 (−12.3)	5.6 (−14.7)	28.0 (−2.2)
Mean daily minimum °F (°C)	−5.7 (−20.9)	−0.9 (−18.3)	−0.1 (−17.8)	16.9 (−8.4)	31.1 (−0.5)	40.8 (4.9)	44.5 (6.9)	40.8 (4.9)	30.9 (−0.6)	15.7 (−9.1)	1.9 (−16.7)	−2.5 (−19.2)	17.8 (−7.9)
Mean minimum °F (°C)	−33.5 (−36.4)	−27.1 (−32.8)	−21.9 (−29.9)	−3.9 (−19.9)	19.3 (−7.1)	31.4 (−0.3)	35.8 (2.1)	29.8 (−1.2)	16.1 (−8.8)	−3.0 (−19.4)	−18.5 (−28.1)	−26.2 (−32.3)	−36.2 (−37.9)
Record low °F (°C)	−52 (−47)	−54 (−48)	−47 (−44)	−33 (−36)	−14 (−26)	19 (−7)	23 (−5)	17 (−8)	−6 (−21)	−24 (−31)	−37 (−38)	−54 (−48)	−54 (−48)
Average precipitation inches (mm)	0.61 (15)	0.71 (18)	0.51 (13)	0.43 (11)	0.84 (21)	2.42 (61)	3.12 (79)	3.01 (76)	1.74 (44)	0.84 (21)	0.84 (21)	0.83 (21)	15.90 (404)
Average snowfall inches (cm)	9.6 (24)	9.6 (24)	8.2 (21)	6.9 (18)	2.6 (6.6)	0.1 (0.25)	0.0 (0.0)	0.0 (0.0)	5.0 (13)	9.4 (24)	12.9 (33)	12.4 (31)	76.7 (194.85)
Average precipitation days (≥ 0.01 in)	7.6	6.0	4.9	4.0	6.5	12.6	15.6	15.6	11.8	9.7	9.8	9.3	113.4
Average snowy days (≥ 0.1 in)	9.1	7.3	6.2	4.6	1.7	0.0	0.0	0.7	2.1	8.3	11.4	10.5	61.9
Source 1: NOAA
Source 2: WRCC (extremes)

== Ecology ==
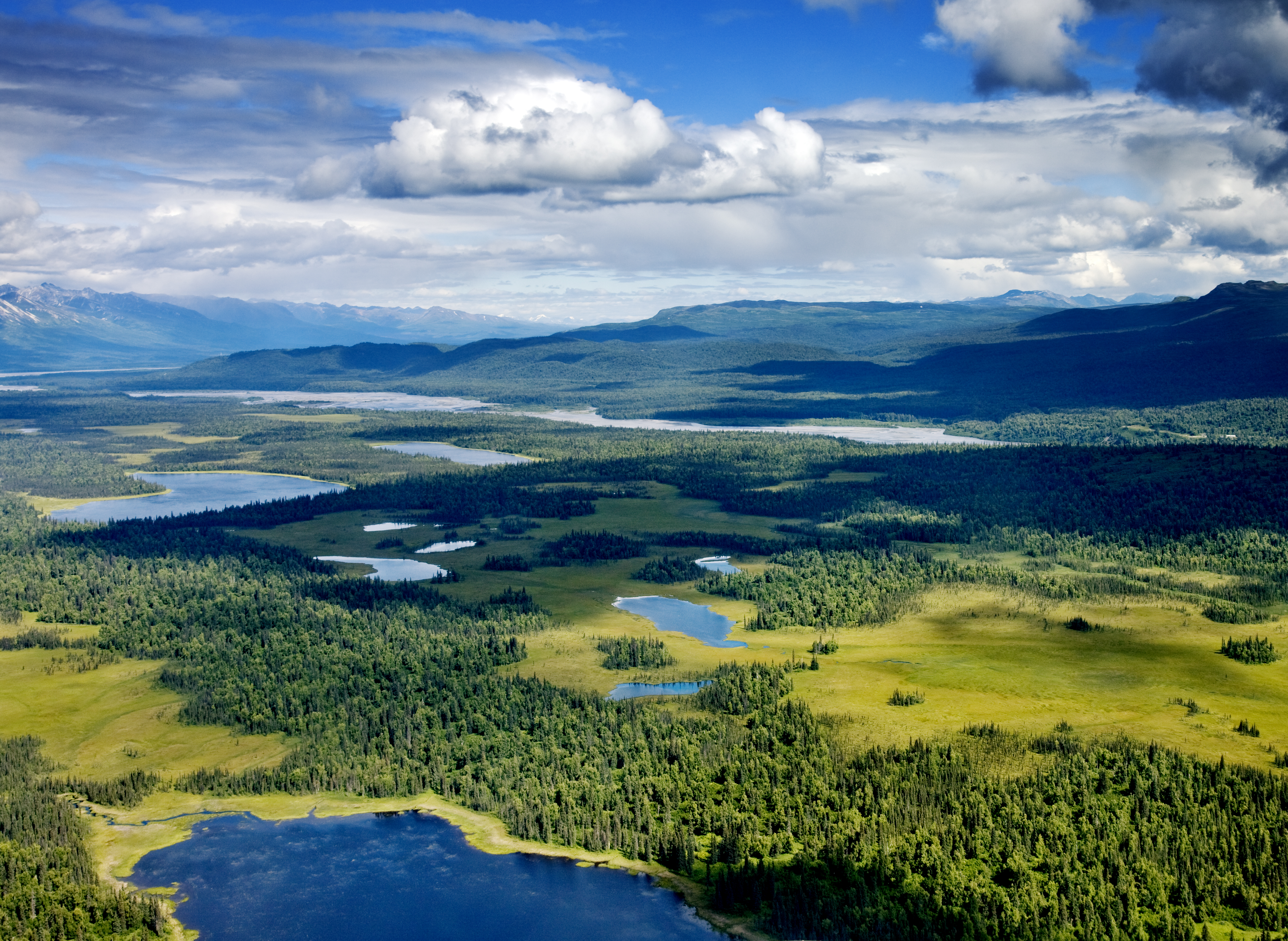
Alpine forest and lakes in Denali

The Alaska Range is a mountainous expanse that runs through the entire park, strongly influencing its ecosystems. Vegetation in the park varies with altitude. The treeline is at 2,500 ft (760 m), causing most of the park to be a vast expanse of tundra. In the park's lowland areas, such as the western sections surrounding Wonder Lake, spruces and willows dominate the forest. Most trees and shrubs do not reach full size due to unfavorable climate and thin soils. There are three types of forest in the park, from lowest to highest: low brush bog, bottomland spruce-poplar forest, and upland spruce-hardwood forest. The forest grows in a mosaic, due to periodic fires.

In the park's tundra, layers of topsoil accumulate on rotten, fragmented rock that has been moved by thousands of years of glacial activity. Mosses, ferns, grasses, and fungi grow on the topsoil. Wild blueberries and soap berries thrive in the tundra and provide the bears of Denali with the main part of their diet.

Denali is home to more than 1,500 species of vascular plants, mosses, and lichens; flowering plants such as goldenrod, fireweed, bluebell, and gentian bloom throughout the summer.

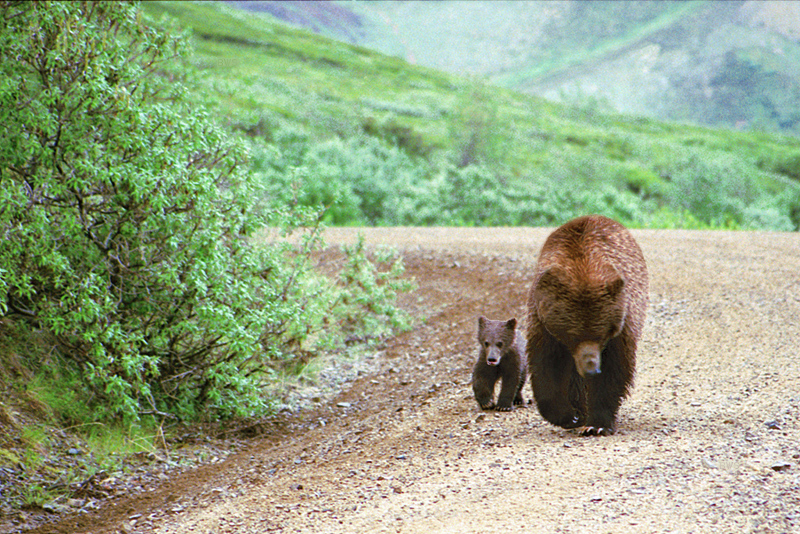
Adult brown bear (Ursus arctos) and cub on the park road

Denali is home to a variety of North American birds and mammals, including an estimated 300–350 grizzly bears on the north side of the Alaska Range (70 bears per 1,000 square miles) and an estimated 2,700 black bears (334 per 1,000 square miles). As of 2014, park biologists were monitoring about 51 wolves in 13 packs (7.4 wolves per 1,000 square miles), while surveys estimated 2,230 caribou in 2013, and 1,477 moose in 2011. Dall sheep are often seen on mountainsides. Smaller animals such as coyotes, hoary marmots, shrews, Arctic ground squirrels, beavers, pikas, and snowshoe hares are seen in abundance. Red and Arctic fox species, martens, Canada lynx, and wolverines also inhabit the park but are more rarely seen due to their elusive natures.

Many migratory bird species reside in the park during late spring and summer. There are waxwings, Arctic warblers, pine grosbeaks, and northern wheatears, as well as ptarmigan and the tundra swan. Raptors include a variety of hawks, owls, and gyrfalcons, as well as the abundant but striking golden eagles.

Ten species of fish, including trout, salmon, and Arctic grayling, share the waters of the park. Many of Denali's larger rivers are glacier-fed and carry heavy silt loads in summer, making them poor fish habitat; fish are more common in the park's clear-water streams and lakes. A single amphibious species, the wood frog, also lives among the lakes of the park.

There are several non-native species in the park including common dandelion, narrowleaf hawksbeard, white sweet clover, bird vetch, yellow toadflax, and scentless false mayweed. There are 28 invasive species documented in the park and 15 of these species are considered a threat. Volunteers and park rangers work to keep non-native plant populations low.

Denali park rangers continually work to keep wildlife wild by limiting human interactions with park animals. Feeding any animal is strictly forbidden, as it may cause adverse effects on the feeding habits of the creature. Visitors are encouraged to view animals from safe distances. In August 2012, the park experienced its first known fatal bear attack when a lone hiker apparently startled a large male grizzly while photographing it. Analysis of the scene and the hiker's camera strongly suggests he violated park regulations regarding backcountry bear encounters, which all permit holders are made aware of. Certain areas of the park are often closed due to uncommon wildlife activity, such as denning areas of wolves and bears or recent kill sites.

== Access and recreation ==
The single road within the park

The park is serviced by the 92 mi (148 km) long Denali Park Road, which begins at the George Parks Highway and continues to the west parallel to the Alaska Range, ending at Kantishna. The park road is the sole vehicle access to the park. Only 15 mi (24 km) of the road, up to Savage River Bridge and a loop trail, is paved because permafrost and the freeze-thaw cycle would create a high cost for maintaining a paved road. Private vehicles are restricted beyond this point. Access to the interior of the park is only through tour/shuttle buses.

Located 1 mi (1.6 km) within the park, the Denali Bus Depot is the departure point for the park's shuttle and tour buses and the visitor contact station for campgrounds. The Denali Visitor Center is at mile marker 1.5 and features an exhibit hall and ranger-led programs. It is also close to the Murie Science and Learning Center, the Denali National Park railroad depot, and the McKinley National Park Airport The railroad station offers service for the Alaska Railroad's Denali Star route between mid-May and Mid-September.

Three campgrounds near the park entrance are accessible by private vehicles: Riley Creek, Savage River, and Teklanika River. Camper buses provide transportation to campgrounds in the interior of the park (Sanctuary River, Igloo Creek, and Wonder Lake). All shuttle and tour buses make a stop at the Toklat River Contact Station at mile 53. Eielson Visitor Center is located four hours into the park on the road (at mile marker 66). It features daily ranger-led programs during the summer, and on clear days, views of Denali and the Alaska Range. Wonder Lake and Kantishna are a six-hour bus ride from the Denali Visitor Center. Snow closes the Park Road past the park headquarters for the winter between October to April. However, the park remains open for cross-country skiing, snowshoeing, and dogsledding.

Kantishna features backcountry lodges accessible by chartered air taxi flight to the Kantishna Airport. Lodging, restaurants, and other services are in the community of Denali Park, one mile north of the park entrance on the George Parks Highway.

While the main park road runs through the Denali Wilderness, the national preserve areas on the northwest and southwest ends of the park, and portions of the park not designated as wilderness, are even more inaccessible, with no roads. The far north of the park, characterized by hills and rivers, is accessed from the east by the Stampede Trail, a dirt road that effectively stops at the park boundary near the former location of the Into the Wild bus. The rugged south portion of the park, characterized by large glacier-filled canyons, is accessed by Petersville Road, a dirt road that stops about 5 mi (8.0 km) outside the park. The mountains can be accessed most easily by air taxis that land on the glaciers.

Visitors who want to climb Denali need to obtain a climbing permit first and go through an orientation at the Walter Harper Talkeetna Ranger Station in Talkeetna, Alaska, about 100 mi (160 km) south of the entrance to Denali National Park and Preserve. This center serves as the center of mountaineering operations.

Denali has the only federal government-owned sled dog kennel, where sled dogs are raised and trained. Sled dogs were first used in the park in 1922 to patrol the area to prevent poaching and assist in park development. Park rangers continue to breed the Alaskan huskies for the traditional activity of mushing and working at the park, particularly during snowy winter. In summer, the kennel hosts dog sledding demonstrations for visitors. The kennel is part of the Mount McKinley National Park Headquarters District, which also includes administration buildings.

=== Hiking ===
Maintained hiking trails are at Savage River, Eielson Visitor Center, Wonder Lake, Denali Visitor Center, and the Tsenesdghaas Na' Trailhead. The park also encourages off-trail hiking. While a guide is not required to hike in Denali, many people choose to hire one for safety, navigation, and interpretation of the wilderness they're traveling through.

Popular hiking trails include Rock Creek Trail, Triple Lakes Trail, Oxbow Loop, Savage Alpine Trail, Horseshoe Lake Trail, Savage River Loop, and more.

Visitors can access hiking past mile 15 of the Denali Park Road by taking the East Fork Transit bus deeper into Denali National Park. The East Fork Transit is a shuttle bus that allows visitors to get on and off wherever they want. They can flag down another green transit bus to travel back to the entrance, or deeper into the National Park.

== Administration and management ==
Denali National Park and Preserve is managed by the National Park Service (NPS), an agency of the United States Department of the Interior. The unit comprises a 4,740,911 acres (19,185.79 km^{2}) national park and an adjoining 1,304,242 acres (5,278.08 km^{2}) national preserve. The area was first protected as Mount McKinley National Park in 1917 and was enlarged, redesignated a national park and preserve, and renamed Denali by the Alaska National Interest Lands Conservation Act in 1980; it had earlier been named an international biosphere reserve in 1976. Park headquarters are near the entrance off the George Parks Highway.

The park's superintendent is Brooke Merrell, who was appointed in 2022 as the first woman to hold the position.

The park recorded 543,300 recreation visits in 2025. The park recorded 601,152 recreation visits in 2019 and 54,850 in 2020, during the COVID-19 pandemic.

== See also ==
- Denali State Park
- List of birds of Denali National Park and Preserve
- List of national parks of the United States

== Bibliography ==
- Brown, William E. (1991) A History of the Denali-Mount McKinley Region, Alaska, National Park Service
- Collier, Michael (2007), The Geology of Denali National Park and Preserve. Alaska Geographic. ISBN 978-0-930931-04-9
- Harris, Ann G.; Tuttle, Esther; Tuttle, Sherwood D. (2004). Geology of the National Parks, 6th ed. Kendall/Hunt. ISBN 978-0-7872-9971-2
- Murie, Adolph (1961), A Naturalist in Alaska. Devin-Adair.
- Murie, Adolph (1981), The Grizzlies of Mount McKinley, National Park Service
- Murie, Adolph (1944), The Wolves of Mount McKinley, Fauna of the National Parks of the United States Series No. 5, National Park Service
- Norris, Frank (2006), Crown Jewel of the North:An Administrative History of Denali National Park and Preserve, Volume 1, National Park Service (10 MB download)
- Norris, Frank (2006), Crown Jewel of the North:An Administrative History of Denali National Park and Preserve, Volume 2, National Park Service (80 MB download)
- Scoggins, Dow (2004), Discovering Denali: A Complete Reference Guide to Denali National Park and Mount McKinley, Alaska. iUniverse Star. ISBN 0-595-29737-4
- Sheldon, Charles (1930), The Wilderness of Denali. Derrydale Press (reprint), ISBN 978-1568331522
- Waits, Ike (2010), Denali National Park, Alaska: Guide to Hiking, Photography and Camping. Wild Rose Guidebooks. ISBN 978-0-9677327-2-5
