= McKinley River =

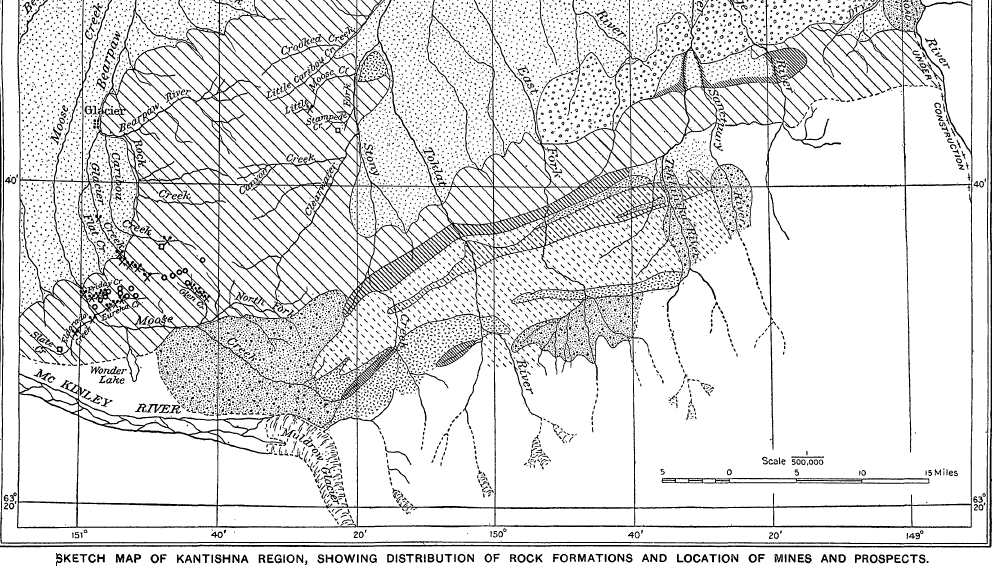
- Kantishna Region geological map showing the location of the Muldrow Glacier origin of the river

- Location of the mouth of the McKinley River in Alaska

Location
- Country: United States
- State: Alaska
- District: Denali Borough

Physical characteristics
- Source: Muldrow Glacier
  - location: Denali National Park and Preserve
  - coordinates: 63°21′51″N 150°25′59″W
  - elevation: 3,117 ft (950 m)
- Mouth: Kantishna River
  - location: confluence with Birch Creek, 23 miles (37 km) east of Lake Minchumina
  - coordinates: 63°51′59″N 151°33′20″W
  - elevation: 646 ft (197 m)
- Length: 58 mi (93 km)

The McKinley River (Lower Tanana: Henteel no' Tl'o) is a 58-mile (93 km) tributary of the Kantishna River in central Alaska in the United States. It drains an area on the north slope of the Alaska Range on the south edge of the Tanana Valley southwest of Fairbanks. The river issues from Muldrow Glacier in the northern Alaska Range in Denali National Park and Preserve, northeast of Denali. It flows through the tundra north of the Alaska Range in a generally northwest direction, joining Birch Creek to form the Kantishna River near Chilchukabena Lake.

The river was named McKinley Fork by A.H. Brooks in 1905. Other names or variants include Henteeth No' Tl'o and Hintusno' Dikats.

== See also ==
- List of rivers of Alaska
