= Kantishna Airport =

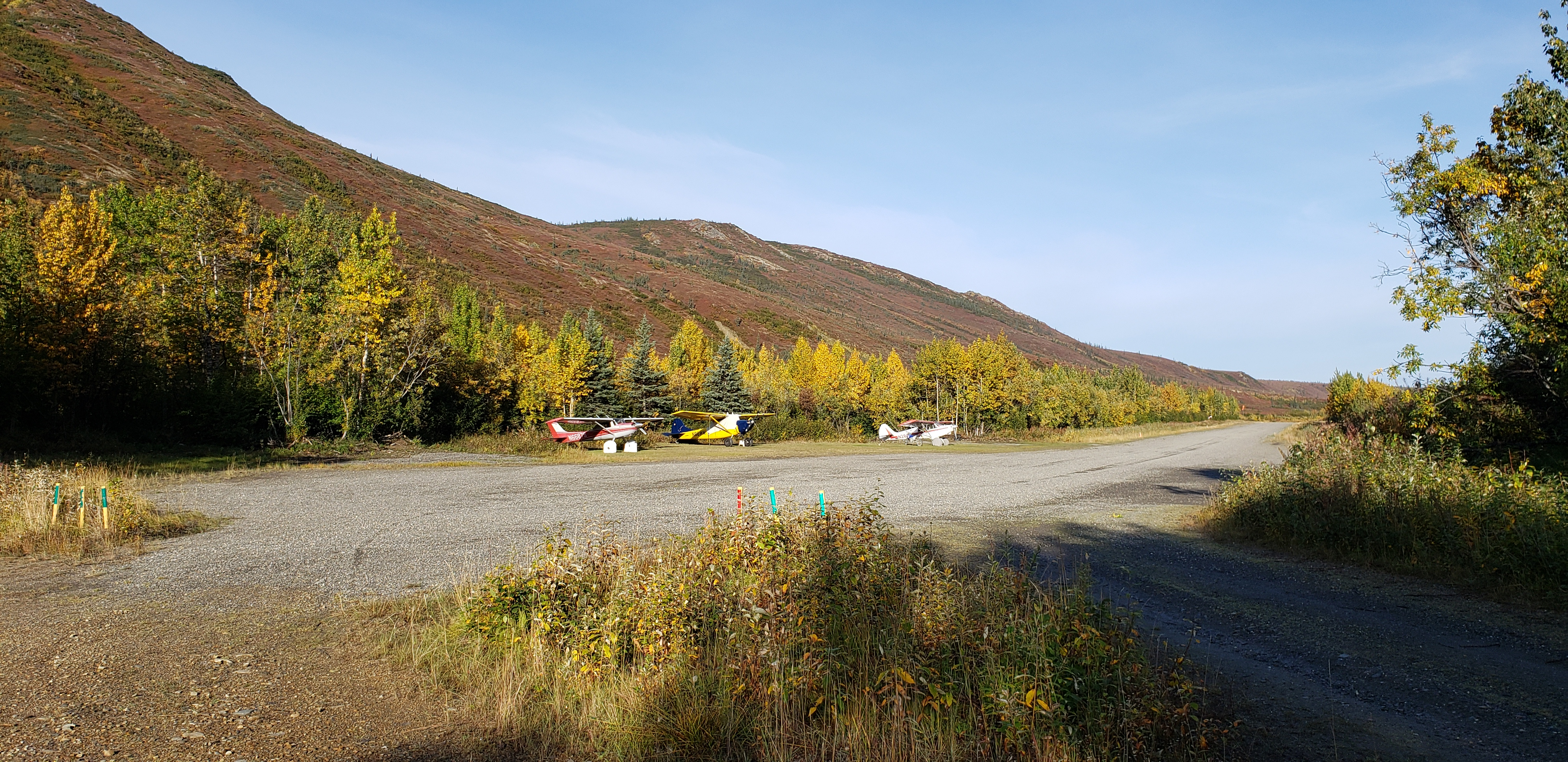
- IATA: none; ICAO: PAAH; FAA LID: 5Z5

Summary
- Airport type: Public
- Owner: State of Alaska
- Serves: Kantishna, Alaska
- Elevation AMSL: 1,575 ft (480 m)
- Coordinates: 63°32′30″N 150°59′38″W

Map
- Location of airport in Alaska

Runways
Direction	Length		Surface
Direction	ft	m	Surface
10/28	1,850	564	Gravel

Statistics
- Aircraft operations (2005): 1,200
- Enplanements (2008): 985
- Sources: Federal Aviation Administration

Kantishna Airport (ICAO: PAAH, FAA LID: 5Z5) is a state-owned airstrip located two nautical miles (3.7 km) northwest of the former mining district of Kantishna in Denali National Park and Preserve, Alaska.

As per Federal Aviation Administration records, the airport had 985 passenger boardings (enplanements) in calendar year 2008. This airport is included in the FAA's National Plan of Integrated Airport Systems for 2009–2013, which categorizes it as a general aviation facility.

== Facilities and aircraft ==
Kantishna Airport covers an area of 6 acres (2.4 ha) at an elevation of 1,575 feet (480 m) above mean sea level. It has one runway designated 10/28 with a gravel surface measuring 1,850 by 35 feet (564 x 11 m). For the 12-month period ending December 31, 2005, the airport had 1,200 aircraft operations, an average of 100 per month: 83% air taxi and 16% general aviation.

== See also ==
- List of airports in Alaska
