= Ferry, Alaska =

Census-designated place in Alaska, US

- Census-designated place
- Location in Denali Borough and the state of Alaska.
- Coordinates: 64°3′52″N 148°59′49″W
- Country: United States
- State: Alaska
- Borough: Denali

Government
  - Borough mayor: Christopher Noel
  - State senator: George Rauscher (R)
  - State rep.: Kevin McCabe (R)

Area
  - Total: 63.60 sq mi (164.73 km^{2})
  - Land: 63.60 sq mi (164.73 km^{2})
  - Water: 0 sq mi (0.00 km^{2})
- Elevation: 1,932 ft (589 m)

Population (2020)
  - Total: 17
  - Density: 0.26/sq mi (0.1/km^{2})
- Time zone: UTC-9 (Alaska (AKST))
  - Summer (DST): UTC-8 (AKDT)
- ZIP code: 99743
- Area code: 907
- FIPS code: 02-25220
- GNIS feature ID: 1866944

Ferry is a census-designated place (CDP) in Denali Borough, Alaska, United States. The population was 17 at the 2020 census, down from 33 in 2010.

== Geography ==
Ferry is located in northern Denali Borough at 64°3′52″N 148°59′49″W (64.064392, -148.997000), along the Nenana River. The George Parks Highway (Alaska Route 3) runs through the CDP, leading north 23 miles (37 km) to Anderson and south 11 miles (18 km) to Healy.

According to the United States Census Bureau, the Ferry CDP has a total area of 63.6 square miles (164.7 km^{2}), all of it land.

== Demographics ==
Historical population
Census	Pop.	Note	%±
1940	31		—
1990	56		—
2000	29		−48.2%
2010	33		13.8%
2020	17		−48.5%
U.S. Decennial Census

Ferry first appeared on the 1940 U.S. Census as an unincorporated village. It did not appear again until 1990 when it was made a census-designated place (CDP).

As of the census of 2007, there were 28 people, 13 households, and 7 families residing in the CDP. The population density was 0.4 inhabitants per square mile (0.15/km^{2}). There were 33 housing units at an average density of 0.5 per square mile (0.19/km^{2}). The racial makeup of the CDP was 100.00% White. 3.45% of the population were Hispanic or Latino of any race.

There were 13 households, out of which 30.8% had children under the age of 18 living with them, 46.2% were married couples living together, and 38.5% were non-families. 38.5% of all households were made up of individuals, and 7.7% had someone living alone who was 65 years of age or older. The average household size was 2.23 and the average family size was 3.00.

In the CDP, the population was spread out, with 24.1% under the age of 18, 48.3% from 25 to 44, 24.1% from 45 to 64, and 3.4% who were 65 years of age or older. The median age was 38 years. For every 100 females, there were 163.6 males. For every 100 females age 18 and over, there were 175.0 males.

The median income for a household in the CDP was $38,750, and the median income for a family was $70,000. Males had a median income of $58,750 versus $0 for females. The per capita income for the CDP was $18,324. There were 16.7% of families and 16.0% of the population living below the poverty line, including 35.3% of under eighteens and none of those over 64.
