= Suntrana, Alaska =

Unincorporated community in the state of Alaska, United States

- Ghost town
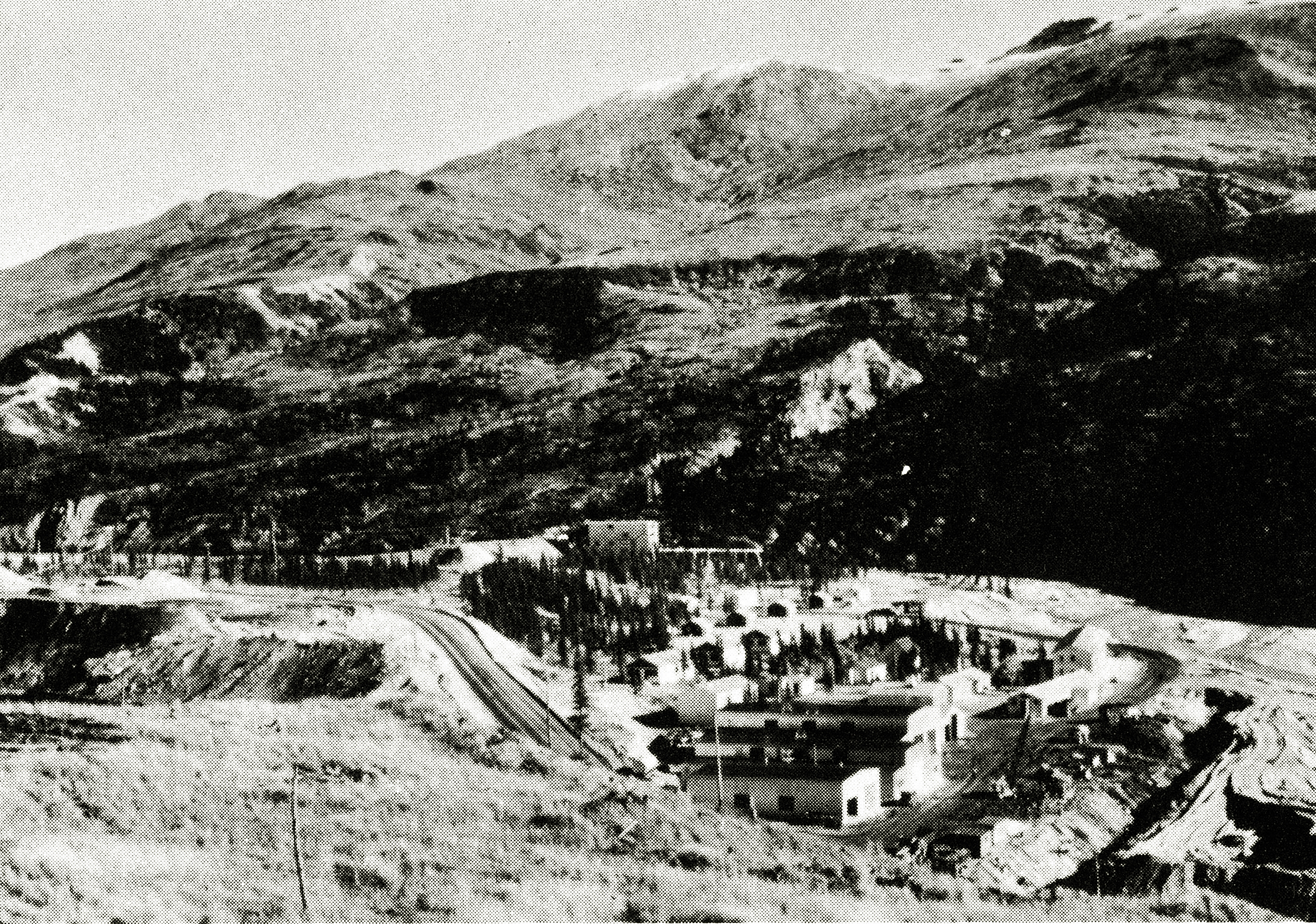
- Mine plant and Alaska Railroad tracks, mid 1950s.

- Location within the state of Alaska
- Coordinates: 63°51′15″N 148°50′54″W
- Country: United States
- State: Alaska
- Borough: Denali

Government
  - Borough mayor: Christopher Noel
  - State senator: George Rauscher (R)
  - State rep.: Kevin McCabe (R)
- Elevation: 1,463 ft (446 m)
- Time zone: UTC-9 (Alaska (AKST))
  - Summer (DST): UTC-8 (AKDT)
- GNIS feature ID: 1410410

Suntrana was an unincorporated community in eastern Denali Borough, Alaska, United States. It is located within the census-designated place of Healy.

It lies off the George Parks Highway south of the city of Anderson, and on the northeastern edge of Denali National Park and Preserve. Its elevation is 1,463 feet (446 m). Located along the right bank of the Healy River, Suntrana lies 3½ miles (5½ km) east of Healy, the borough seat of the Denali Borough.

The town and mine at Suntrana no longer exist, the site of company housing is now mostly reforested, and little of the mine, power house or old tipple complex remains.

== Demographics ==
Historical population
Census	Pop.	Note	%±
1930	61		—
1940	78		27.9%
1950	130		66.7%
1960	81		−37.7%
1970	67		−17.3%
1980	56		−16.4%
U.S. Decennial Census

Suntrana first appeared on the 1940 U.S. Census as an unincorporated village. In 1980, it was made a census-designated place (CDP). In 1990, the CDP was dissolved and was attached to Healy CDP.
