= List of places in Alaska (U) =

This list of cities, towns, unincorporated communities, counties, and other recognized places in the U.S. state of Alaska also includes information on the number and names of counties in which the place lies, and its lower and upper zip code bounds, if applicable.

Name of place	Number of counties	Principal county	Lower zip code	Upper zip code
Uganik	1	Kodiak Island Borough	99697	
Ugashik	1	Lake and Peninsula Borough	99683	
Ugashik	1	Lake and Peninsula Borough		
Ukak	1	Bethel Census Area		
Ukivok	1	Nome Census Area		
Umiat	1	North Slope Borough		
Umkumiut	1	Bethel Census Area	99637	
Unalakleet	1	Nome Census Area	99684	
Unalakleet Airport	1	Nome Census Area	99684	
Unalaska	1	Aleutians West Census Area	99685	
Unalaska Airport	1	Aleutians West Census Area		
Unalaska City School District	1	Aleutians West Census Area		
Unga	1	Aleutians East Borough		
Ungalik	1	Nome Census Area	99684	
Ungalikthluk	1	Dillingham Census Area		
Unimak	1	Aleutians East Borough		
Upper Kalskag	1	Bethel Census Area	99607	
Upper Mendenhall Valley	1	City and Borough of Juneau	99801	
Upper Nickeyville	1	Ketchikan Gateway Borough	99901	
Usibelli	1	Denali Borough	99787	
Usibelli Mine	1	Yukon-Koyukuk Census Area	99787	
Utica	1	Northwest Arctic Borough		
Utopia	1	Yukon-Koyukuk Census Area		
Uyak	1	Kodiak Island Borough		
Uzinki	1	Kodiak Island Borough		
