= Interior Alaska =

Geographic region

Coordinates: 65°N 152°W

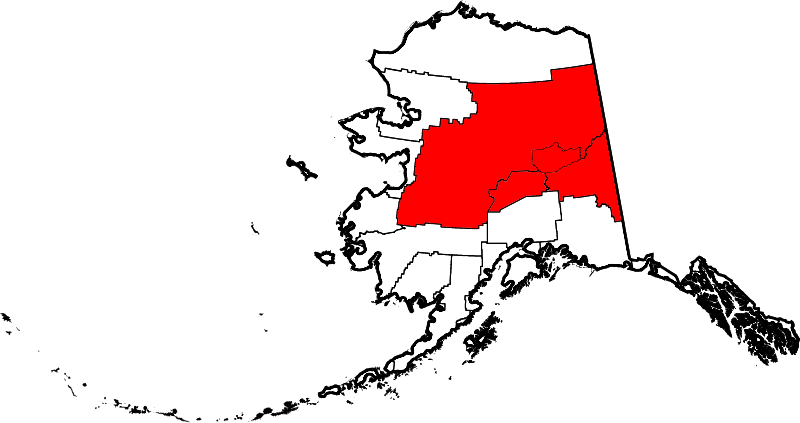
Interior Alaska

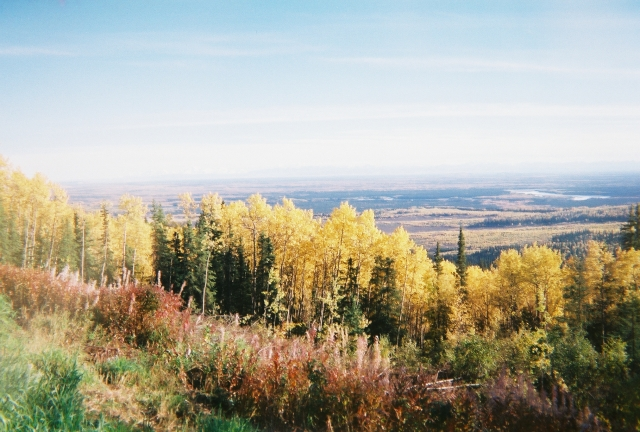
Fall in Interior Alaska

Interior Alaska is the central region of Alaska's territory, roughly bounded by the Alaska Range to the south and the Brooks Range to the north. It is largely wilderness. Mountains include Denali in the Alaska Range, the Wrangell Mountains, and the Ray Mountains. The native people of the interior are Alaskan Athabaskans. The largest city in the interior is Fairbanks, Alaska's second-largest city, in the Tanana Valley. Other towns include North Pole, just southeast of Fairbanks, Eagle, Tok, Glennallen, Delta Junction, Nenana, Anderson, Healy, and Cantwell. The interior region has an estimated population of 113,154.

== Climate ==
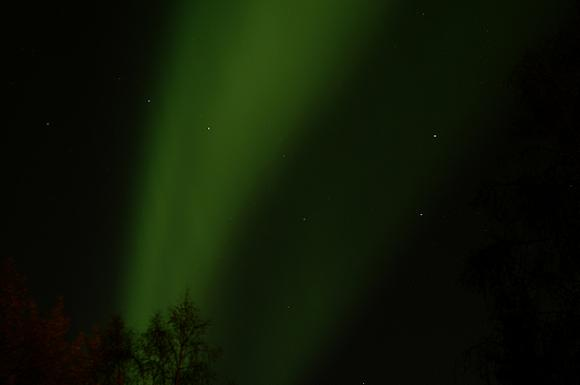
Northern Lights and Big Dipper at Fairbanks, AK during September.

Interior Alaska experiences extreme seasonal temperature variability, experiencing temperate to warm summers and the coldest winters in the entire United States. Winter temperatures in Fairbanks average −12 °F (−24 °C) and summer temperatures average +62 °F (+17 °C). Temperatures there have been recorded as low as −65 °F (−54 °C) in mid-winter, and as high as +99 °F (+37 °C) in summer. Both the highest and lowest temperature records for the state were set in the Interior, with 100 °F (38 °C) in Fort Yukon and −80 °F (−62 °C) in Prospect Creek. Temperatures within a given winter are highly variable as well; extended cold snaps of forty below zero can be followed by unseasonable warmth with temperatures above freezing due to chinook wind effects.

Summers can be warm and dry for extended periods creating ideal fire weather conditions. Weak thunderstorms produce mostly dry lightning, sparking wildfires that are mostly left to burn themselves out as they are often far from populated areas. The 2004 season set a new record with over 6,600,000 acres (27,000 km^{2}) burned.

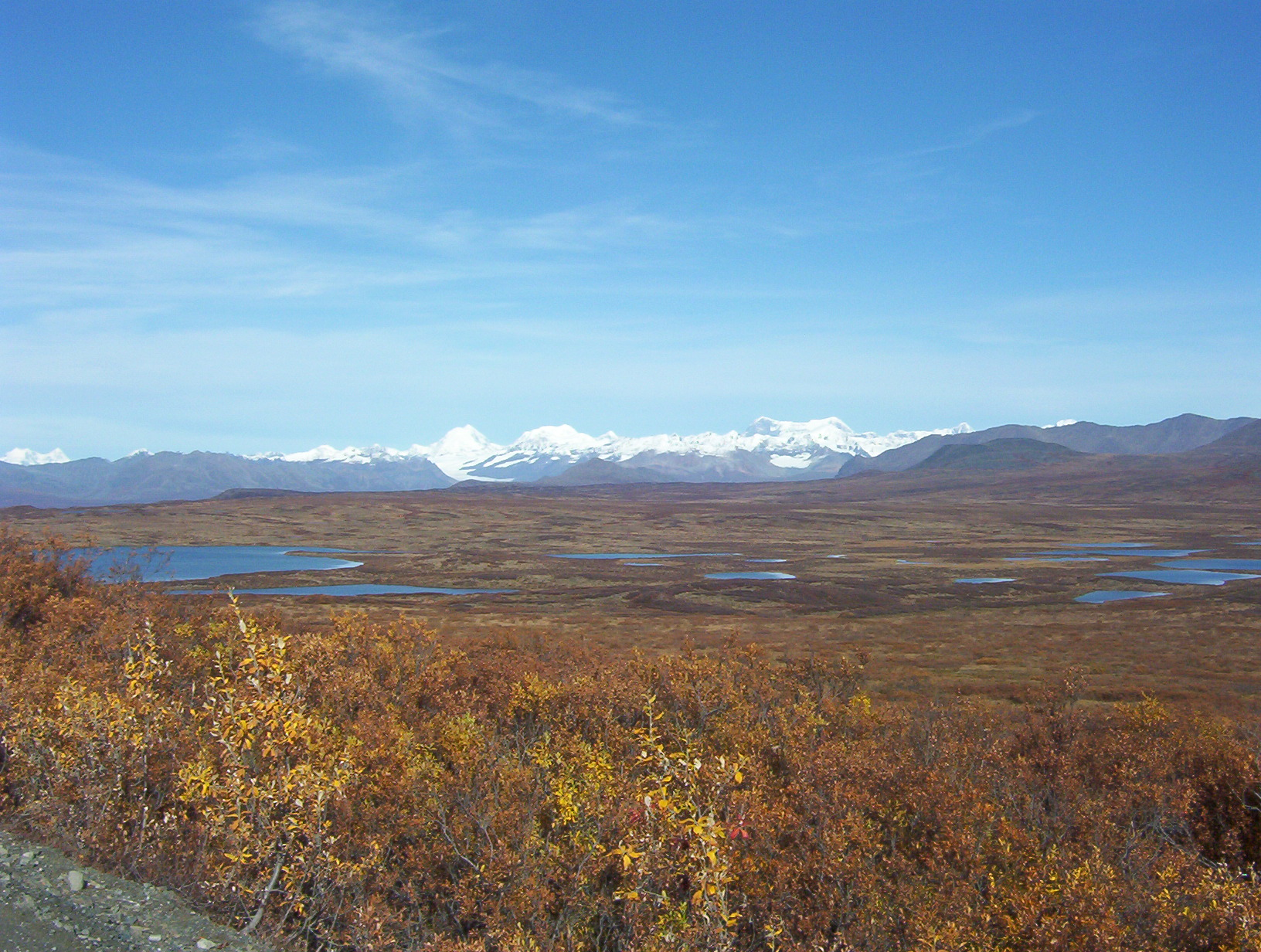
Lakes and peaks of the Alaska Range seen from the Denali Highway

The average annual precipitation in Fairbanks is 11.3 inches (287 mm). Most of this comes in the form of snow during the winter. Most storms in the interior of Alaska originate in the Gulf of Alaska, south of the state, though these storms often have limited precipitation due to a rain shadow effect caused by the Alaska Range.

On clear winter nights, the aurora borealis can often be seen in the sky. Like all subarctic regions, the months from May to July in the summer have no night, only a twilight during the night hours. The months of November to January have little daylight. Fairbanks receives an average 21 hours of daylight between May 10 and August 2 each summer, and an average of less than four hours of daylight between November 18 and January 24 each winter.

The interior of Alaska is largely underlined by discontinuous permafrost, which grades to continuous permafrost as the Arctic Circle is approached.

Summer 2009 Fires (outlined in red)

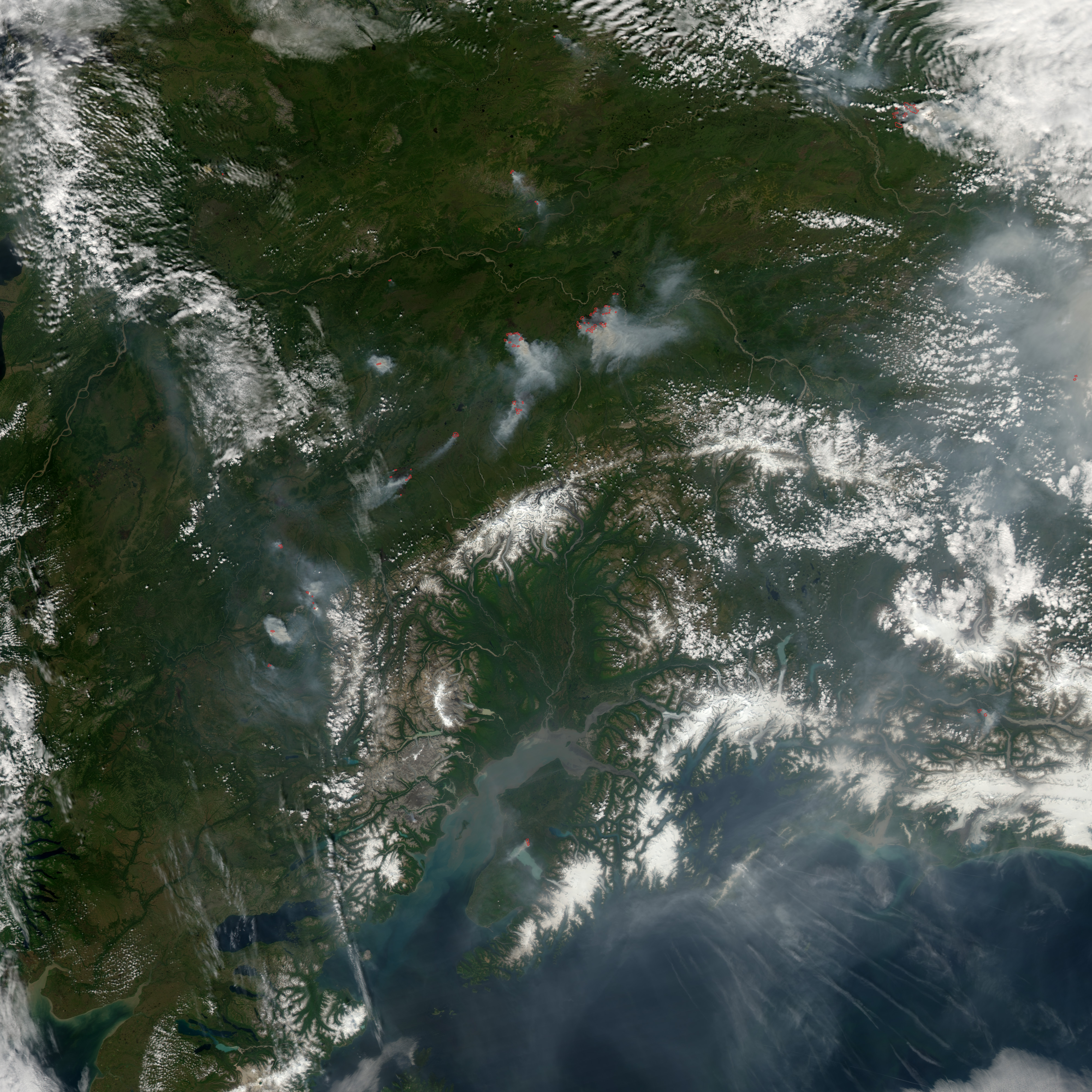
Fires in Interior Alaska from July 7, 2009.

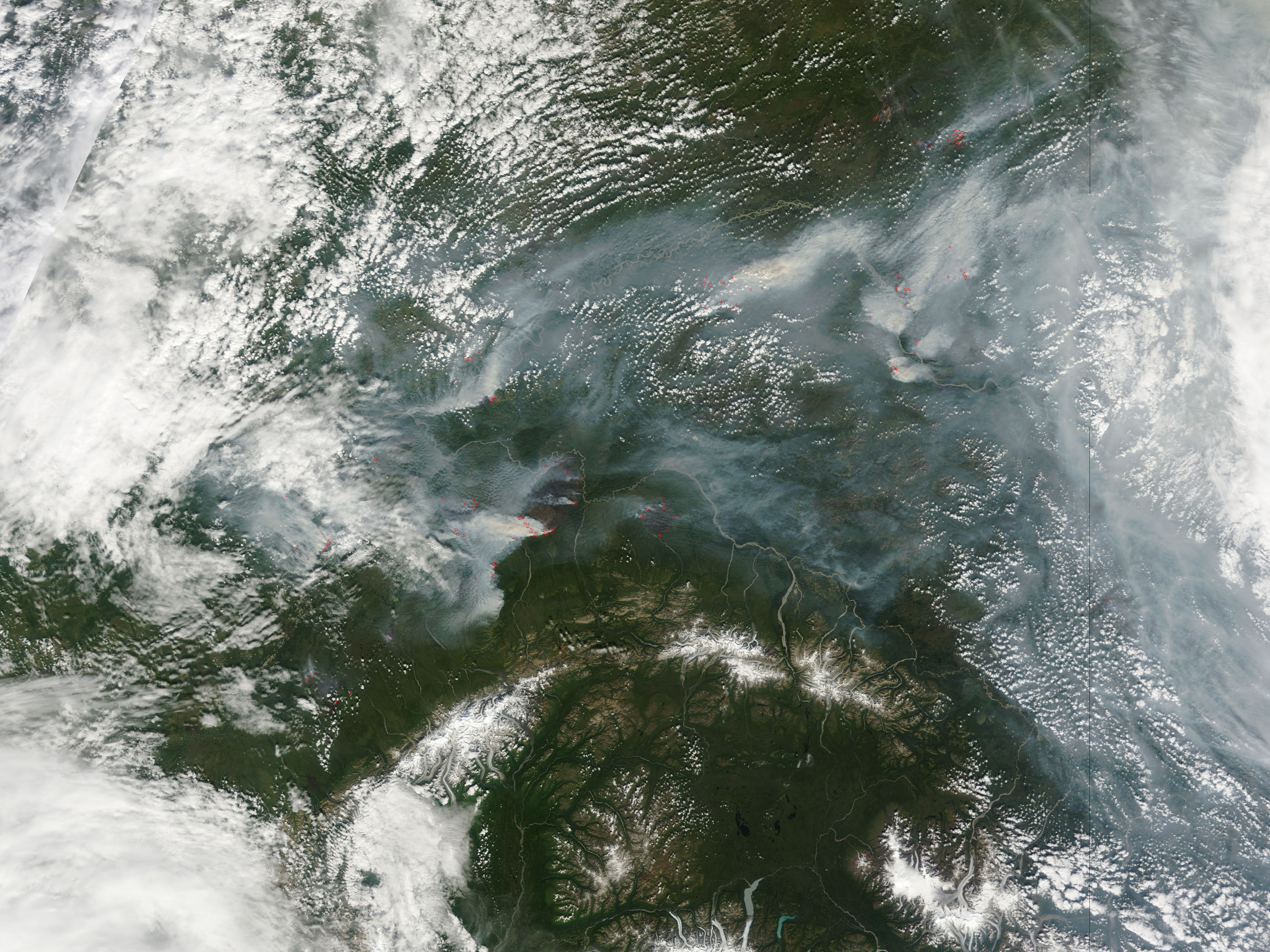
The thick pall of smoke the fires were creating (August 2, 2009).

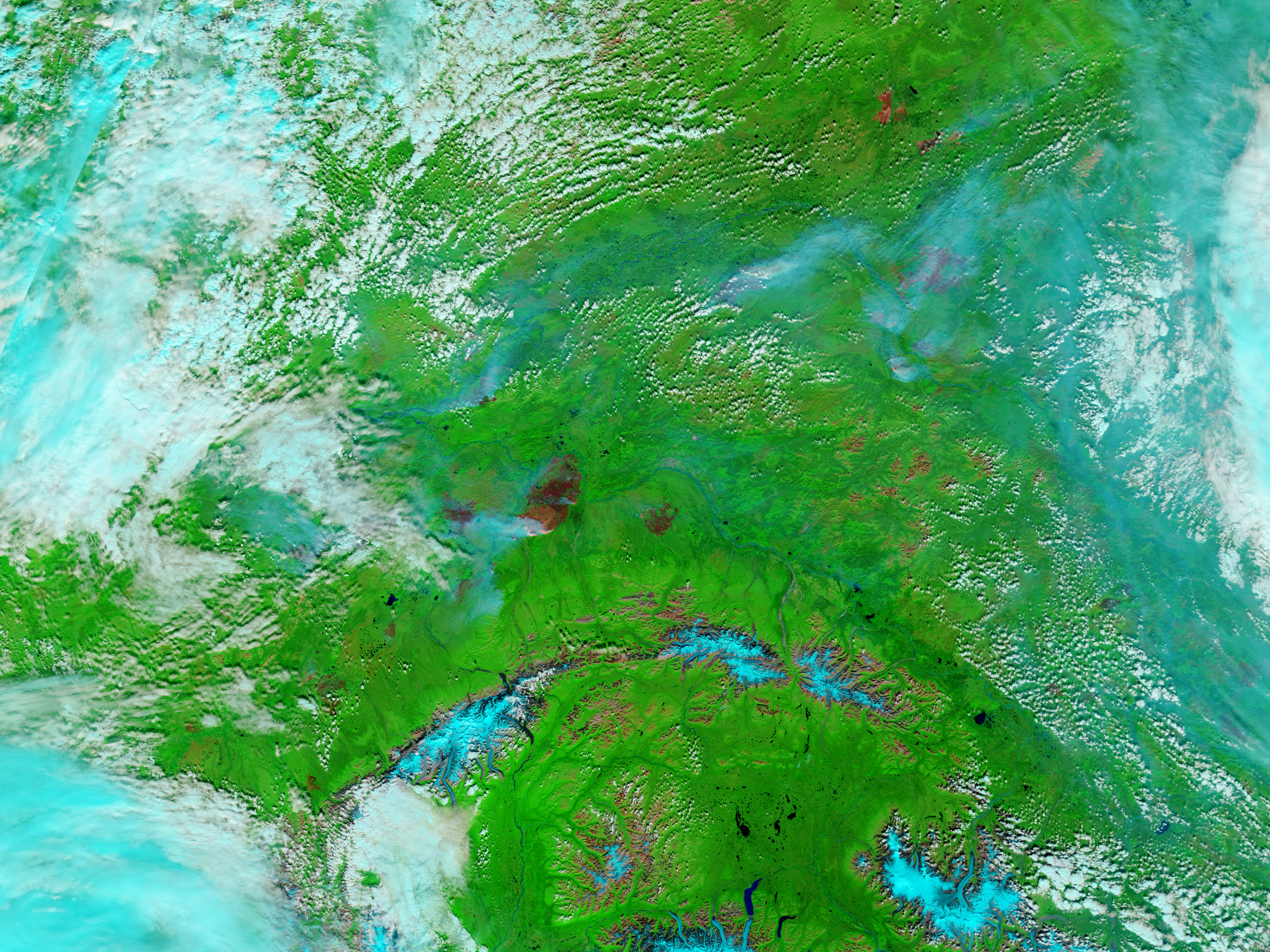
Visible, short wave and near-infrared image showing burned areas (brick red) and unburned vegetation (bright green) (August 2, 2009).

Climate data for Fairbanks International Airport, Alaska (1991–2020 normals, (Note: Mean monthly maxima and minima (i.e. the highest and lowest temperature readings during an entire month or year) calculated based on data at said location from 1991 to 2020.) extremes 1904–present (Note: Records for Fairbanks have been kept at the Fairbanks International Airport since December 1929 and at an undisclosed location from September 1904 to November 1929. For more information, see ThreadEx))
Month	Jan	Feb	Mar	Apr	May	Jun	Jul	Aug	Sep	Oct	Nov	Dec	Year
Record high °F (°C)	52 (11)	50 (10)	56 (13)	76 (24)	90 (32)	96 (36)	99 (37)	93 (34)	84 (29)	72 (22)	54 (12)	58 (14)	99 (37)
Mean maximum °F (°C)	29.7 (−1.3)	35.4 (1.9)	45.1 (7.3)	61.9 (16.6)	76.6 (24.8)	85.1 (29.5)	85.0 (29.4)	80.0 (26.7)	69.3 (20.7)	54.8 (12.7)	32.7 (0.4)	32.2 (0.1)	87.5 (30.8)
Mean daily maximum °F (°C)	0.6 (−17.4)	11.6 (−11.3)	24.9 (−3.9)	45.6 (7.6)	62.1 (16.7)	71.8 (22.1)	72.7 (22.6)	66.4 (19.1)	55.3 (12.9)	34.1 (1.2)	12.3 (−10.9)	4.3 (−15.4)	38.5 (3.6)
Daily mean °F (°C)	−8.3 (−22.4)	0.2 (−17.7)	10.7 (−11.8)	33.7 (0.9)	50.3 (10.2)	61.0 (16.1)	62.9 (17.2)	57.0 (13.9)	45.8 (7.7)	26.2 (−3.2)	4.1 (−15.5)	−4.3 (−20.2)	28.3 (−2.1)
Mean daily minimum °F (°C)	−17.2 (−27.3)	−11.2 (−24.0)	−3.4 (−19.7)	21.7 (−5.7)	38.6 (3.7)	50.2 (10.1)	53.1 (11.7)	47.6 (8.7)	36.2 (2.3)	18.4 (−7.6)	−4.1 (−20.1)	−13.0 (−25.0)	18.1 (−7.7)
Mean minimum °F (°C)	−43.2 (−41.8)	−36.0 (−37.8)	−27.3 (−32.9)	−2.4 (−19.1)	26.2 (−3.2)	40.2 (4.6)	44.2 (6.8)	36.1 (2.3)	23.4 (−4.8)	−2.9 (−19.4)	−25.9 (−32.2)	−36.5 (−38.1)	−45.8 (−43.2)
Record low °F (°C)	−66 (−54)	−58 (−50)	−56 (−49)	−32 (−36)	−1 (−18)	28 (−2)	30 (−1)	21 (−6)	3 (−16)	−28 (−33)	−54 (−48)	−62 (−52)	−66 (−54)
Average precipitation inches (mm)	0.61 (15)	0.52 (13)	0.40 (10)	0.34 (8.6)	0.54 (14)	1.48 (38)	2.26 (57)	2.10 (53)	1.35 (34)	0.76 (19)	0.74 (19)	0.57 (14)	11.67 (296)
Average snowfall inches (cm)	10.2 (26)	10.0 (25)	6.5 (17)	3.1 (7.9)	0.9 (2.3)	0.0 (0.0)	0.0 (0.0)	0.0 (0.0)	2.3 (5.8)	8.2 (21)	12.5 (32)	10.9 (28)	64.6 (164)
Average extreme snow depth inches (cm)	19.5 (50)	22.8 (58)	23.8 (60)	20.1 (51)	1.5 (3.8)	0.0 (0.0)	0.0 (0.0)	0.0 (0.0)	1.0 (2.5)	4.9 (12)	11.0 (28)	15.1 (38)	25.8 (66)
Average precipitation days (≥ 0.01 in)	8.7	6.9	5.7	3.7	6.2	10.8	12.8	13.5	10.7	9.8	9.5	8.8	107.1
Average snowy days (≥ 0.1 in)	10.2	8.3	6.7	2.6	0.6	0.0	0.0	0.0	1.3	8.3	11.2	10.4	59.6
Average relative humidity (%)	69.3	65.5	60.4	56.2	50.2	56.6	64.2	70.8	68.9	74.1	72.8	71.3	65.0
Average dew point °F (°C)	−17.0 (−27.2)	−11.9 (−24.4)	−0.2 (−17.9)	16.2 (−8.8)	29.7 (−1.3)	42.6 (5.9)	48.7 (9.3)	46.0 (7.8)	34.5 (1.4)	17.4 (−8.1)	−3.8 (−19.9)	−13.2 (−25.1)	15.8 (−9.0)
Mean monthly sunshine hours	54	120	224	302	319	334	274	164	122	85	71	36	2,105
Source 1: NOAA (relative humidity 1961–1990)
Source 2: Danish Meteorological Institute (sun, 1931–1960)

== Alaska Natives ==
While the vast majority of indigenous Native people of Interior Alaska are Athabaskan, large Yup'ik and Iñupiaq populations reside in Fairbanks.

The federally recognized tribes of Interior Alaska:

- Council of Athabascan Tribal Governments (CATG): Beaver Village, Birch Creek Tribe, Circle Native Community, Native Village of Fort Yukon, Native Village of Venetie Tribal Government (also known as Arctic Village and Village of Venetie).
- Tanana Chiefs Conference (TCC): Allakaket Village, Alatna Village, Village of Anaktuvuk Pass, Chalkyitsik Village, Village of Dot Lake, Native Village of Eagle, Evansville Village (also known as Bettles Field), Galena Village (also known as Louden Village), Healy Lake Village, Hughes Village, Huslia Village, Village of Kaltag, Koyukuk Native Village, Manley Hot Springs Village, Native Village of Minto, Nenana Native Association, Nikolai Village (Edzeno’ Native Council), Northway Village, Nulato Village, Rampart Village, Native Village of Ruby, Native Village of Stevens, Native Village of Tanacross, Telida Village, Native Village of Tetlin.
- Tanana Tribal Council: Native Village of Tanana.
- Other places in the Interior Service Area not Federally Recognized as Tribes: Alcan, Anderson, Big Delta, Canyon Village, Central, Chatanika, Chicken, Clear, Delta Junction, Fairbanks, Fox, Indian River, Kokrines, Lake Minchumina, Medfra, North Pole, Salcha, Tok, Toklat, Tolovana, Wiseman, Wood River.
