= Denali Borough School District =

Alaskan school district

Address
- 1 Suntrana Street Healy, Alaska, 99743; United States

District information
- Type: Public
- Grades: Pre-K–12
- NCES District ID: 0200770

Students and staff
- Students: 1,073
- Teachers: 26.85
- Staff: 35.83
- Student–teacher ratio: 39.96

Other information
- Website: www.dbsd.org

Denali Borough School District is a school district headquartered in Healy, Alaska, serving the Denali Borough. As of the 2019–20 school year, it enrolls 1,000 students across four schools.

Up until the Denali Borough was incorporated in 1990, the district was called the Upper Railbelt Regional Education Attendance Area and comprised the communities Anderson (village), Usibelli, Healy, Cantwell, McKinley Park, and Suntrana.

== Schools ==
The district operates three traditional K-12 schools, as well as Denali PEAK Correspondence, a homeschool program open to students from anywhere in the state.

- Anderson School (33 students)
- Cantwell School (10 students)
- Tri-Valley School (176 students)
