= Cantwell Glacier =

Glacier in Alaska, United States

- Location within Alaska
- Interactive map of Cantwell Glacier
- Type: Valley glacier
- Location: Denali Borough, Alaska, U.S.
- Coordinates: 63°26′44″N 149°26′42″W

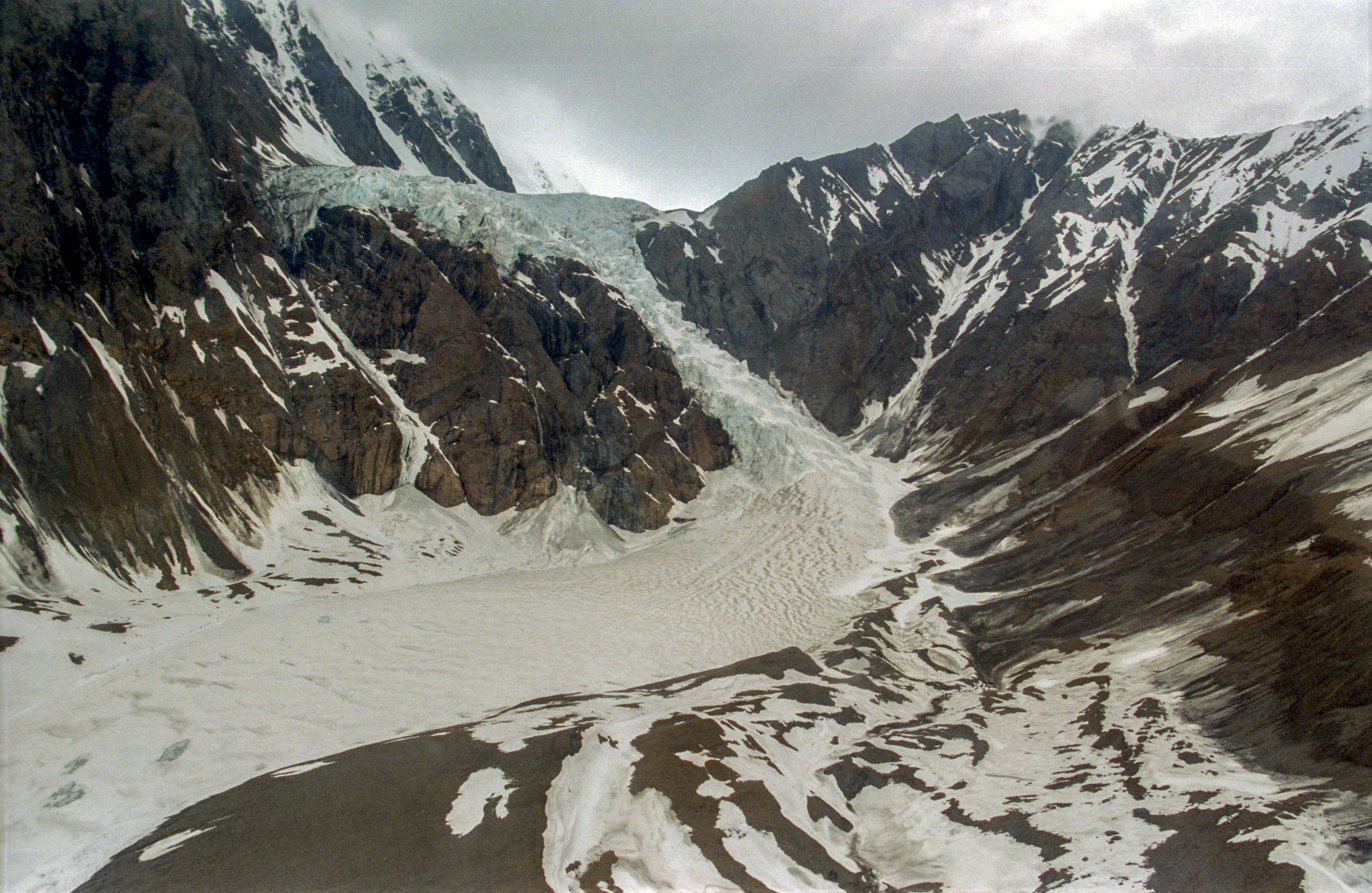
Alaska Range

Cantwell Glacier is a glacier in Denali National Park and Preserve in the U.S. state of Alaska. The 3-mile (4.8 km) long glacier originates from the crest of the Alaska Range in the eastern part of the park, giving rise to Cantwell Creek. Cantwell Glacier and Cantwell Creek are named for Yukon Valley explorer John C. Cantwell.

== See also ==
- List of glaciers
