= John C. Cantwell =

American Coast Guard officer and explorer (1859–1940)

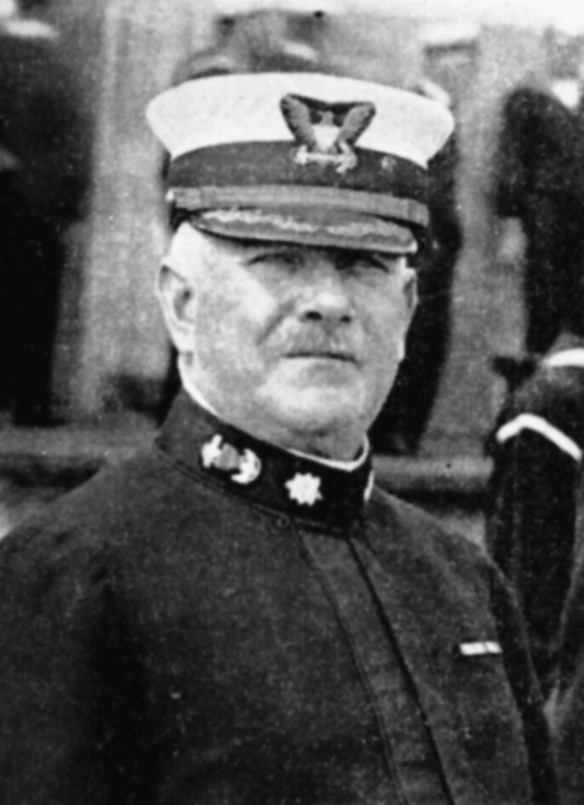
- Born: 9 January 1859; Raleigh, North Carolina
- Died: 8 October 1940 (aged 81) Sausalito, California
- Allegiance: United States of America
- Branch: U.S. Revenue Cutter Service; United States Coast Guard
- Service years: 1879–1920
- Rank: Captain (USRCS); Commander (USCG)
- Commands: San Pedro Training Center; USRC Onondaga; USRC Manning; USRC McCulloch; USRS Nunivak
- Conflicts: World War I

John Cassin Cantwell (9 January 1859 – 8 October 1940) was a United States Coast Guard officer and early United States explorer of Alaska.

== Biography ==
Born in Raleigh, North Carolina, Cantwell was the son of an Irish-born military officer who sent him to study at a Roman Catholic seminary in Ireland. Returning to the United States, he joined the United States Revenue Cutter Service as a seaman in 1879. After a year, he passed a competitive officer candidate examination and became a cadet on 7 June 1880. He was commissioned as a third lieutenant on 5 July 1882.

In 1884, Cantwell was assigned to the USRC Thomas Corwin based at San Francisco. Under the command of Captain Michael A. Healy, the Thomas Corwin made summer patrols to the Bering Sea and Alaskan coast in both 1884 and 1885. The delta and lower part of the Kowak River having been explored by U.S. Navy Lieutenant George M. Stoney in 1883, Cantwell was sent to explore further upriver in the ship's steam launch in 1884. He conducted additional exploration of the river valley the following summer accompanied by Smithsonian Institution naturalist Charles Townsend.

From 1886 to 1898, Cantwell made additional visits to the Bering Sea and Alaskan coast as part of the summer Bering Sea Fleet. He was promoted to second lieutenant on 25 July 1888 and first lieutenant on 27 May 1895. Cantwell commanded the Revenue Service steamer Nunivak on the Yukon River from 1899 to 1901. He subsequently published "Report on the Operations of the United States Revenue Steamer Nunivak on the Yukon River Station, 1899–1901".

Cantwell was promoted to captain on 11 October 1904. Thereafter, he commanded several Revenue Service cutters. Cantwell was the commanding officer of USRC McCulloch on a 1906 Alaskan patrol and USRC Manning on a 1907 Alaskan patrol. He then commanded USRC Onondaga based at Norfolk, Virginia.

Cantwell was promoted to senior captain during World War I, serving as commanding officer of the San Pedro Coast Guard training center.

Cantwell retired from active duty on 10 May 1920 and settled in Sausalito, California. In 1921, he was reclassified as a commander on the retired list when U.S. Coast Guard officer ranks were aligned with U.S. Navy ranks. Cantwell died at a Marin County hospital in Sausalito and was buried in the Pacific Ocean from the Thetis-class cutter USCGC Daphne on 10 October 1940.

== Legacy ==
Cantwell Glacier, Cantwell Creek and the town of Cantwell in Alaska were named in his honor. The Nenana River was formerly named in his honor.
