= Anderson, Alaska =

City in Alaska, United States

Anderson
- City
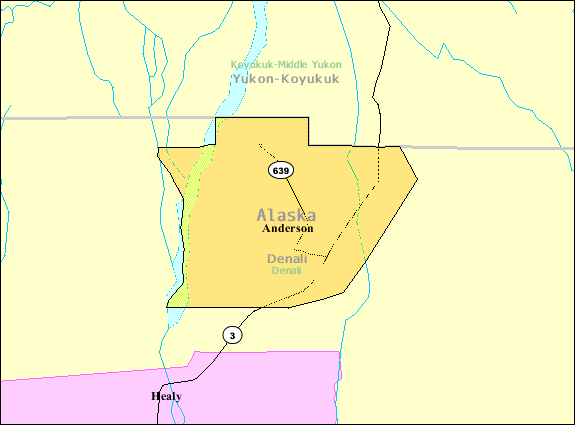
- Detailed map of Anderson

- Logo
- Motto: "Home of the Anderson Grizzlies"
- Location in Denali Borough and the state of Alaska.

- Location within Alaska Location within North America
- Coordinates: 64°20′43″N 149°11′43″W
- Country: United States
- State: Alaska
- Borough: Denali
- Incorporated: June 2, 1962

Government
  - Mayor: Katie Griebe
  - Borough mayor: Christopher Noel
  - State senator: George Rauscher (R)
  - State rep.: Kevin McCabe (R)

Area
  - Total: 44.98 sq mi (116.51 km^{2})
  - Land: 42.20 sq mi (109.30 km^{2})
  - Water: 2.79 sq mi (7.22 km^{2})
- Elevation: 515 ft (157 m)

Population (2020)
  - Total: 177
  - Density: 4.2/sq mi (1.62/km^{2})
- Time zone: UTC-9 (Alaska (AKST))
  - Summer (DST): UTC-8 (AKDT)
- ZIP code: 99744
- Area code: 907
- FIPS code: 02-03220
- GNIS feature ID: 1398245
- Website: www.anderson.govoffice.com

Anderson is a city in the Denali Borough, Alaska, United States, and the borough's only incorporated community. At the 2010 census the population was 246, down from 367 at the 2000 census. At the 2020 census, the population dropped to 177 residents. The city is named after one of the original homesteaders.

== History ==
=== Early years ===
Anderson is named after Arthur Anderson, one of several homesteaders who settled in the area in the late 1950s. In 1959, Anderson subdivided his homestead into house lots and sold most of the lots to civilian workers from Clear Air Force Station, a Ballistic Missile Early Warning System station completed in 1961. An elementary school was built in the community in 1961, and Anderson incorporated as a city on June 2, 1962.

In the 1960s, a road was completed between Anderson and Nenana. A ferry across the Tanana River at Nenana provided access to the Fairbanks–Nenana Highway, and hence to Fairbanks and the contiguous North American highway system via the Richardson and Alaska Highways. The ferry was replaced with a bridge in 1968. In 1972, the George Parks Highway was completed, which provided direct road access to points south, including Anchorage.

=== 21st century ===
In March 2007, the city announced a plan to attract more residents: the awarding of free land to interested applicants. This concept has been compared to that of the Homestead Act.

The Anderson/Clear Lions Club, in conjunction with commercial sponsors and Two Rivers-based concert promoters Acoustic Adventures, hosted the annual Anderson Bluegrass Festival. Held on the last weekend of every July from Friday through Sunday at Riverside Park, the festival was the city's significant visitor attraction. The festival was discontinued in 2012. It was replaced with a similar, privately run family music festival held in the same location starting in 2015.

== Geography ==
Anderson is located at 64°20′43″N 149°11′43″W (64.345372, -149.195352), abutting the northern border of the Denali Borough. Anderson is north of Healy, south of Nenana and 75 miles (121 km) southwest of Fairbanks. The Anderson townsite lies in between the Alaska Railroad mainline and the Nenana River, along the northern edge of city limits. The George Parks Highway (5.5 miles (8.9 km) east of the townsite) and Clear Air Force Station (5.5 miles (8.9 km) south of the townsite) are also within city limits. Clear Space Force Station is home to the 13th Space Warning Squadron, 213th Space Warning Squadron, and 268th Security Forces Squadron. Anderson lies 289 miles (465 km) north of Anchorage, the most populous city of Alaska, and 81 miles (130 km) southwest of Fairbanks.

According to the United States Census Bureau, the city has a total area of 47.3 square miles (122.5 km^{2}), of which 43.7 square miles (113.3 km^{2}) is land and 3.6 square miles (9.2 km^{2}), or 7.49%, is water.

Anderson attracts mostly curious visitors, owing to its "out of the way" location at the end of a side road, plus those stopping to camp or access the Nenana River at Riverside Park.

== Demographics ==
Historical population
Census	Pop.	Note	%±
1970	362		—
1980	517		42.8%
1990	628		21.5%
2000	367		−41.6%
2010	246		−33.0%
2020	177		−28.0%
U.S. Decennial Census

Anderson first appeared on the 1970 U.S. Census as a city, having incorporated in 1962.

=== 2020 census ===
As of the 2020 census, Anderson had a population of 177. The median age was 37.8 years. 32.8% of residents were under the age of 18 and 9.0% of residents were 65 years of age or older. For every 100 females there were 115.9 males, and for every 100 females age 18 and over there were 101.7 males age 18 and over.

0.0% of residents lived in urban areas, while 100.0% lived in rural areas.

There were 68 households in Anderson, of which 26.5% had children under the age of 18 living in them. Of all households, 54.4% were married-couple households, 26.5% were households with a male householder and no spouse or partner present, and 14.7% were households with a female householder and no spouse or partner present. About 32.3% of all households were made up of individuals and 7.3% had someone living alone who was 65 years of age or older.

There were 131 housing units, of which 48.1% were vacant. The homeowner vacancy rate was 6.8% and the rental vacancy rate was 51.9%.

Racial composition as of the 2020 census
Race	Number	Percent
White	154	87.0%
Black or African American	0	0.0%
American Indian and Alaska Native	6	3.4%
Asian	0	0.0%
Native Hawaiian and Other Pacific Islander	0	0.0%
Some other race	0	0.0%
Two or more races	17	9.6%
Hispanic or Latino (of any race)	3	1.7%

=== 2000 census ===
As of the census of 2000, there were 367 people, 101 households, and 74 families residing in the city. The population density was 7.9 people per square mile (3.1 people/km^{2}). There were 148 housing units at an average density of 3.2 units per square mile (1.2 units/km^{2}). The racial makeup of the city was 86.38% White, 4.36% Black or African American, 1.36% Native American, 0.27% Asian, 0.82% from other races, and 6.81% from two or more races. 5.18% of the population were Hispanic or Latino of any race.

There were 101 households, out of which 40.6% had children under the age of 18 living with them, 56.4% were married couples living together, 10.9% had a female householder with no husband present, and 26.7% were non-families. 20.8% of all households were made up of individuals, and none had someone living alone who was 65 years of age or older. The average household size was 2.60 and the average family size was 3.05.

In the city, the age distribution of the population shows 21.0% under the age of 18, 12.0% from 18 to 24, 42.0% from 25 to 44, 22.6% from 45 to 64, and 2.5% who were 65 years of age or older. The median age was 33 years. For every 100 females, there were 175.9 males. For every 100 females age 18 and over, there were 187.1 males.

The median income for a household in the city was $58,750, and the median income for a family was $62,188. Males had a median income of $31,641 versus $23,750 for females. The per capita income for the city was $23,837. About 15.6% of families and 17.6% of the population were below the poverty line, including 25.8% of those under age 18 and 10.0% of those age 65 or over.

== Education ==
K-12 students attend Anderson School, operated by the Denali Borough School District.
