= Cantwell, Alaska =

Cantwell, Alaska Yidateni Na’
- Census-designated place
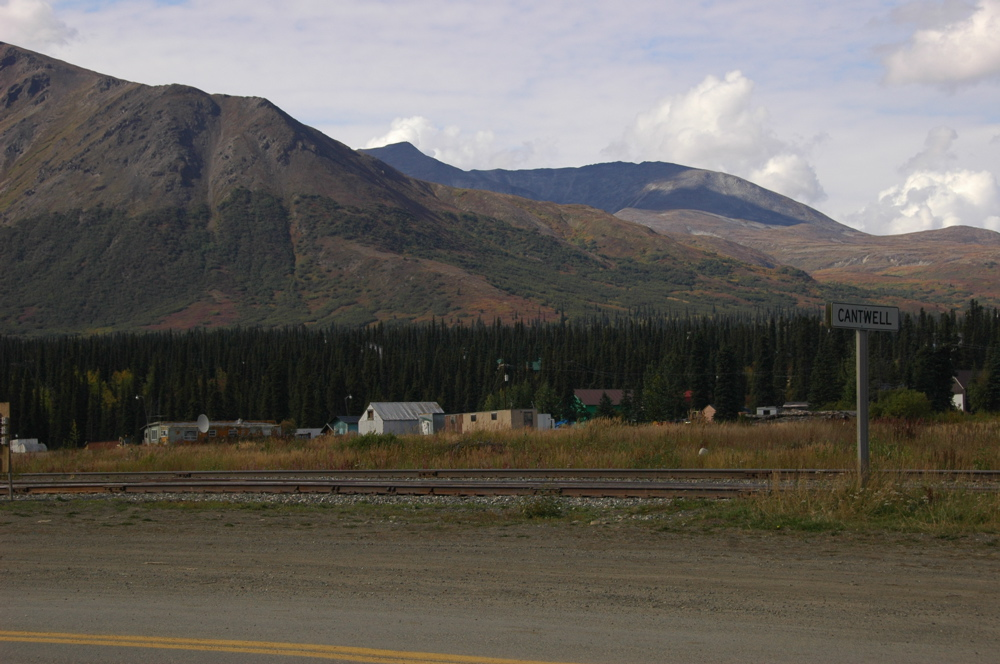
- Town of Cantwell, Alaska. Tracks for the Alaska Railroad run through the foreground.

- Location in Denali Borough and the state of Alaska.
- Coordinates: 63°23′17″N 148°54′1″W
- Country: United States
- State: Alaska
- Borough: Denali

Government
  - Borough mayor: Christopher Noel
  - State senator: George Rauscher (R)
  - State rep.: Kevin McCabe (R)

Area
  - Total: 119.37 sq mi (309.16 km^{2})
  - Land: 119.02 sq mi (308.26 km^{2})
  - Water: 0.35 sq mi (0.91 km^{2})
- Elevation: 2,190 ft (670 m)

Population (2020)
  - Total: 200
  - Density: 1.7/sq mi (0.65/km^{2})
- Time zone: UTC−09:00 (Alaska (AKST))
  - Summer (DST): UTC−08:00 (AKDT)
- ZIP Code: 99729
- Area code: 907
- FIPS code: 02-10150

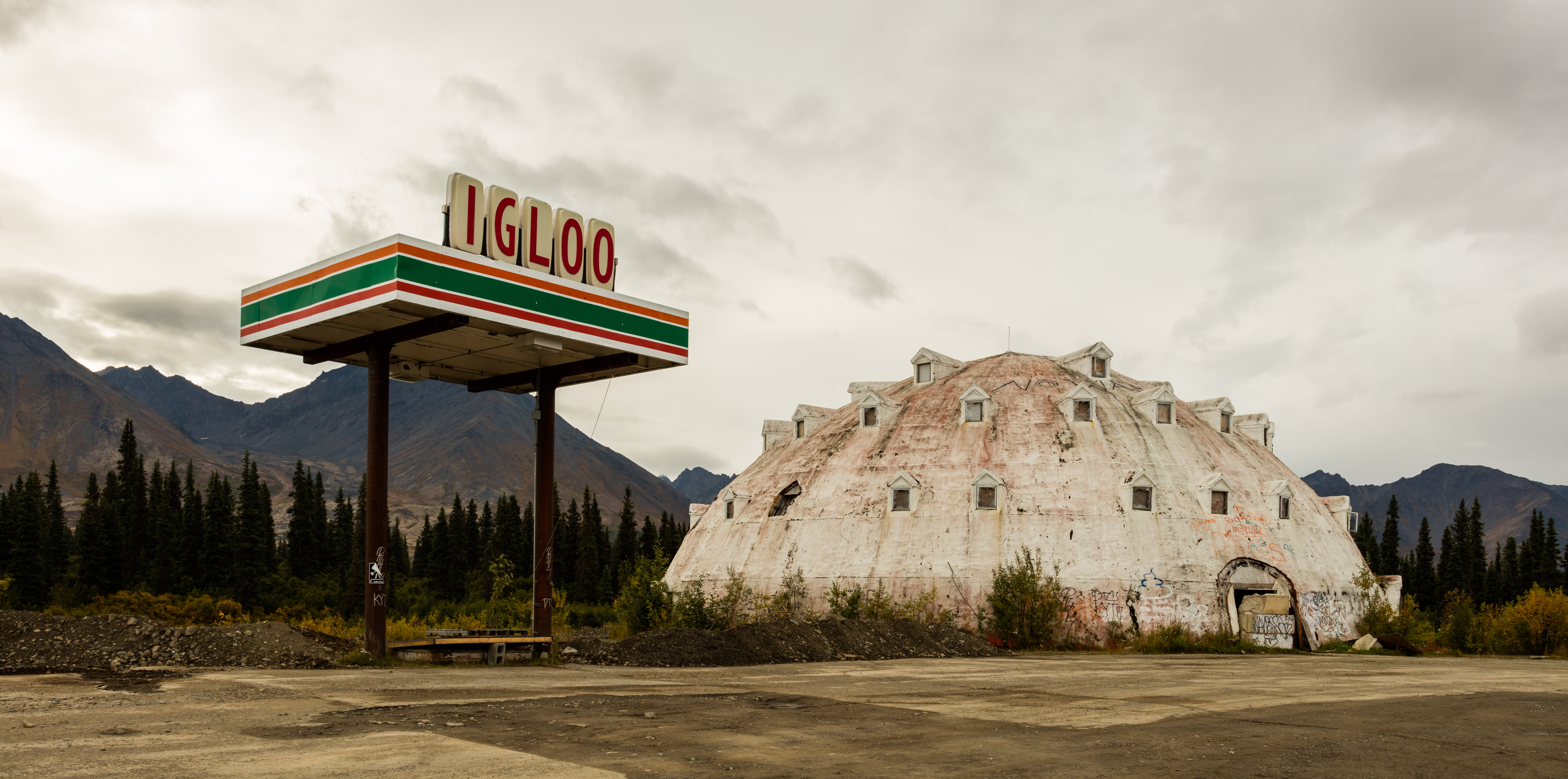
Abandoned Igloo City hotel in Cantwell

Cantwell (Yidateni Na’ in Ahtna Athabascan) is a census-designated place (CDP) in Denali Borough, Alaska, United States. As of the 2020 census, the population of the CDP was 200.

Cantwell is the western terminus of the Denali Highway. Once an Alaska Railroad flag stop at the junction with the Denali Highway, it was founded off the Parks Highway.

== History ==
Prior to the western settlement of Cantwell, the only inhabitants of the area were nomadic Ahtna Athabaskans who subsisted off the land. The Ahtna people know Cantwell as 'Yedatene'na'. Then Cantwell was renamed after Lieutenant J. C. Cantwell, military explorer and commander of the revenue steamer Nunivak on the Yukon River, 1899-1901. The settled town began as a flag stop on the Alaska Railroad. This flagstop supplied the Valdez Creek mining area, which had the name "Denali" for the Valdez Creek community. Many Indians from the village of Tyone came to work at Valdez Creek and later lived out their lives in the Cantwell area. Many Tyones are buried in the old Cantwell graveyard, next to the railroad tracks. Oley Nicklie, a Native Alaskan, sought work with the railroad after fur prices dropped. He and his two brothers then founded part of the settlement. Cantwell is 20 miles away from a giant abandoned igloo shaped hotel, which is not made out of ice.

Cantwell served as a partial filming location for the Lure of the Yukon during the 1920s, and for the 2007 movie Into the Wild.

== Geography ==
Cantwell is located in the southern part of Denali Borough at 63°23′17″N 148°54′1″W (63.388000, -148.900204). It is situated at the north end of Broad Pass, along Cantwell Creek and the Jack River, tributaries of the north-flowing Nenana River. Alaska Route 3, the George Parks Highway, passes through Cantwell: Anchorage is 212 miles (341 km) to the south, and Fairbanks is 150 miles (240 km) to the north.

According to the United States Census Bureau, the Cantwell CDP has a total area of 117.6 square miles (304.7 km^{2}), of which 117.3 square miles (303.8 km^{2}) is land and 0.35 square miles (0.9 km^{2}), or 0.29%, is water.

== Climate ==
Cantwell has a continental subarctic climate (Köppen Dfc), having mild summers with crisp nights and long, severely cold, and very snowy winters. On a midsummers day on July 17, 2003, 6 inches of snow fell in Cantwell.

Climate data for Cantwell, Alaska, 1991–2020 normals, 1983-2020 extremes: 2132ft (650m)
Month	Jan	Feb	Mar	Apr	May	Jun	Jul	Aug	Sep	Oct	Nov	Dec	Year
Record high °F (°C)	44 (7)	52 (11)	58 (14)	64 (18)	78 (26)	87 (31)	85 (29)	87 (31)	71 (22)	66 (19)	48 (9)	45 (7)	87 (31)
Mean daily maximum °F (°C)	9.9 (−12.3)	19.0 (−7.2)	25.4 (−3.7)	39.5 (4.2)	54.0 (12.2)	65.0 (18.3)	65.8 (18.8)	60.6 (15.9)	50.3 (10.2)	33.7 (0.9)	18.4 (−7.6)	13.4 (−10.3)	37.9 (3.3)
Daily mean °F (°C)	0.7 (−17.4)	7.7 (−13.5)	11.7 (−11.3)	27.7 (−2.4)	41.5 (5.3)	52.0 (11.1)	55.2 (12.9)	50.7 (10.4)	40.7 (4.8)	25.1 (−3.8)	9.2 (−12.7)	3.9 (−15.6)	27.2 (−2.7)
Mean daily minimum °F (°C)	−8.6 (−22.6)	−3.5 (−19.7)	−1.9 (−18.8)	15.9 (−8.9)	29.1 (−1.6)	38.9 (3.8)	44.5 (6.9)	40.8 (4.9)	31.1 (−0.5)	16.5 (−8.6)	0.1 (−17.7)	−5.7 (−20.9)	16.4 (−8.6)
Record low °F (°C)	−49 (−45)	−47 (−44)	−45 (−43)	−32 (−36)	6 (−14)	23 (−5)	28 (−2)	13 (−11)	−11 (−24)	−29 (−34)	−36 (−38)	−47 (−44)	−49 (−45)
Average precipitation inches (mm)	0.89 (23)	0.86 (22)	0.66 (17)	0.47 (12)	0.76 (19)	1.59 (40)	2.93 (74)	3.32 (84)	2.51 (64)	1.23 (31)	0.86 (22)	0.74 (19)	16.82 (427)
Average snowfall inches (cm)	21.7 (55)	15.4 (39)	13.9 (35)	10.6 (27)	5.4 (14)	0.2 (0.51)	0.0 (0.0)	0.0 (0.0)	4.0 (10)	15.9 (40)	16.4 (42)	21.7 (55)	125.2 (317.51)
Source 1: NOAA (1981-2010 snowfall)
Source 2: XMACIS2 (records)

== Demographics ==
Historical population
Census	Pop.	Note	%±
1940	17		—
1950	67		294.1%
1960	85		26.9%
1970	62		−27.1%
1980	89		43.5%
1990	147		65.2%
2000	222		51.0%
2010	219		−1.4%
2020	200		−8.7%
U.S. Decennial Census

Cantwell first appeared on the 1940 U.S. Census as an unincorporated village. It was classified as a census-designated place (CDP) in 1980.

As of the census of 2000, there were 222 people, 102 households, and 59 families residing in the CDP. The population density was 1.9 inhabitants per square mile (0.73/km^{2}). There were 178 housing units at an average density of 1.5 per square mile (0.58/km^{2}). The racial makeup of the CDP was 65.32% White, 0.45% Black or African American, 22.52% Native American, 1.80% Asian, 0.90% from other races, and 9.01% from two or more races. Hispanic or Latino of any race were 1.35% of the population.

There were 102 households, out of which 25.5% had children under the age of 18 living with them, 44.1% were married couples living together, 8.8% had a female householder with no husband present, and 41.2% were non-families. 33.3% of all households were made up of individuals, and 2.9% had someone living alone who was 65 years of age or older. The average household size was 2.18 and the average family size was 2.80.

In the CDP, the population was spread out, with 20.7% under the age of 18, 4.1% from 18 to 24, 37.4% from 25 to 44, 30.2% from 45 to 64, and 7.7% who were 65 years of age or older. The median age was 40 years. For every 100 females there were 111.4 males. For every 100 females age 18 and over, there were 114.6 males.

The median income for a household in the CDP was $43,750, and the median income for a family was $39,792. Males had a median income of $55,625 versus $17,500 for females. The per capita income for the CDP was $22,615. None of the families and about 2.0% of the population were living below the poverty line, including none of those under the age of 18 and none of those 65 and older.

== Education ==
K-12 students attend Cantwell School, operated by the Denali Borough School District. Cantwell School has multi-grade classrooms with individual learning targets for every student.
