= Usibelli, Alaska =

Unincorporated community in the state of Alaska, United States

- Unincorporated community
- Location within the state of Alaska
- Coordinates: 63°51′41″N 148°46′49″W
- Country: United States
- State: Alaska
- Borough: Denali

Government
  - Borough mayor: Christopher Noel
  - State senator: George Rauscher (R)
  - State rep.: Kevin McCabe (R)
- Elevation: 1,654 ft (504 m)
- Time zone: UTC-9 (Alaska (AKST))
  - Summer (DST): UTC-8 (AKDT)
- GNIS feature ID: 1411590

Usibelli is an unincorporated community in Denali Borough, Alaska, United States, 5 miles (8 km) east of Healy. Its elevation is 1,654 feet (504 m). The community is named for the Usibelli Coal Mine; located near the community, the mine is the chief economic enterprise in the area. With its large deposits and its status as the only coal mine in the state, Usibelli Coal Mine has long been prominent; it is a primary supplier for coal-fired power plants in the Fairbanks area and in southern Alaska, and it exports coal to South Korea and Chile. In recent years, the mine has stood to benefit from efforts for American energy independence; a bill in the United States Senate in 2008 was amended to encourage conversion of coal into liquid fuels for the use of the United States Air Force.
