= Nenana River =

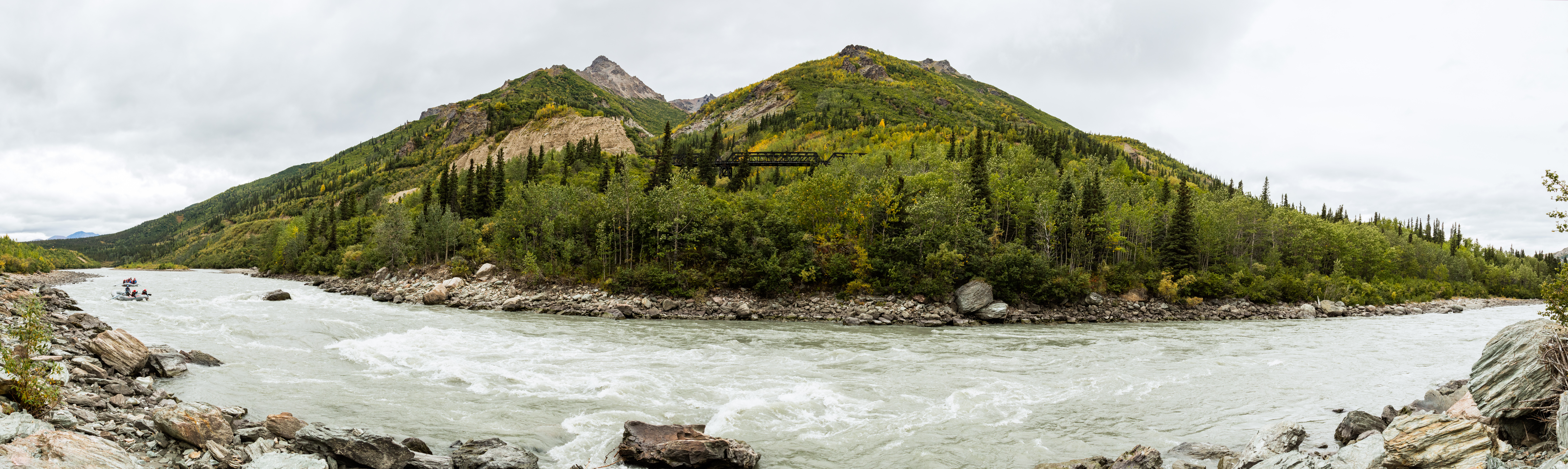
- Rafters on the Nenana River, near Denali National Park and Preserve

- Location of the mouth of the Nenana River in Alaska

Location
- Country: United States
- State: Alaska
- District: Denali Borough, Matanuska-Susitna Borough, Yukon–Koyukuk Census Area

Physical characteristics
- Source: Nenana Glacier
  - location: Alaska Range, Denali Borough
  - coordinates: 63°29′43″N 147°48′01″W
  - elevation: 3,237 ft (987 m)
- Mouth: Tanana River
  - location: Nenana, Yukon–Koyukuk Census Area
  - coordinates: 64°33′53″N 149°06′18″W
  - elevation: 344 ft (105 m)
- Length: 140 mi (230 km)

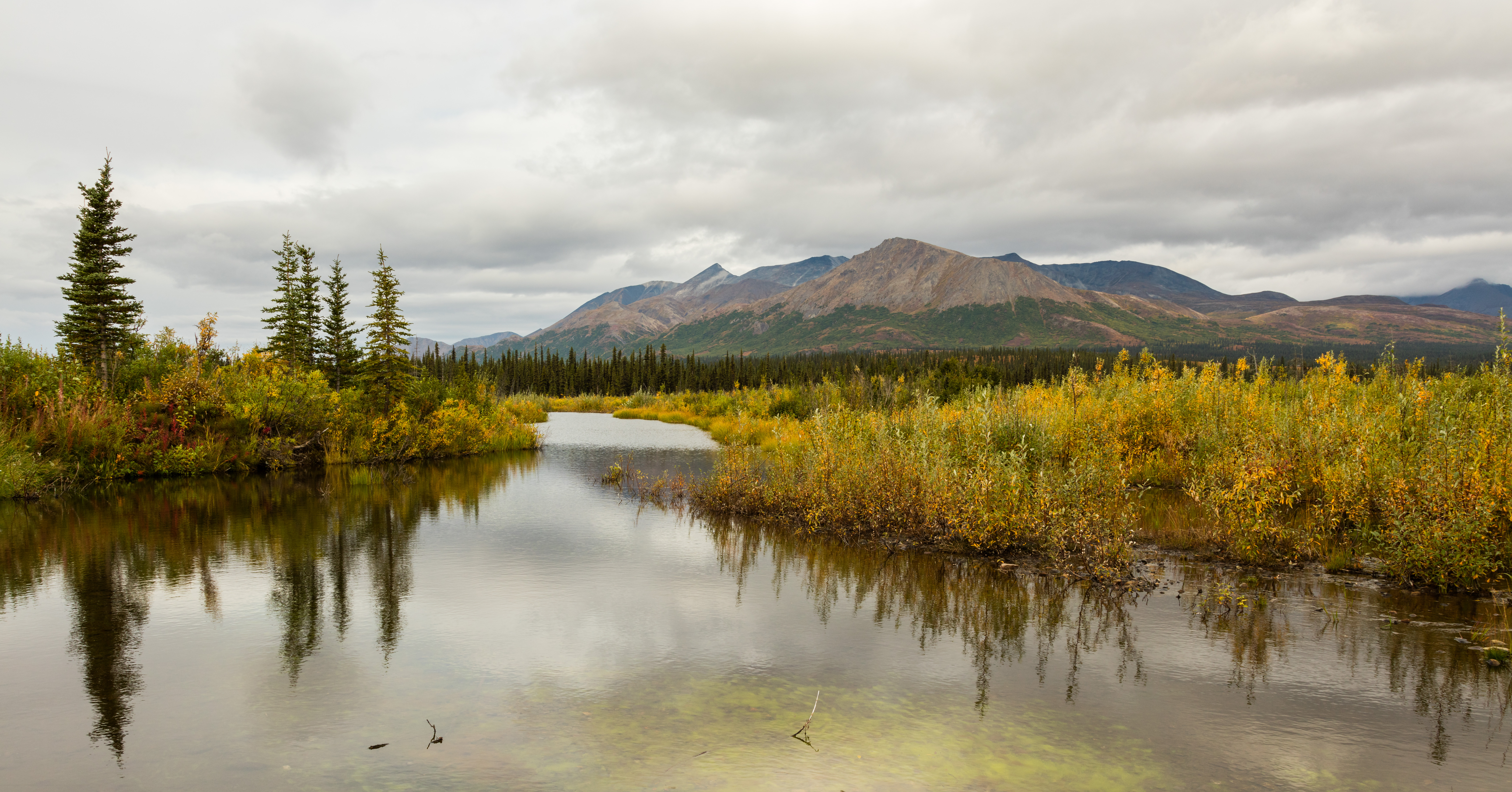
Affluent of the Nenana River in Denali Park, Alaska.

The Nenana River (Lower Tanana: Nina No’) is a tributary of the Tanana River, approximately 140 miles (230 km) long, in central Alaska in the United States. It drains an area on the north slope of the Alaska Range on the south edge of the Tanana Valley southwest of Fairbanks.

It issues from the Nenana Glacier in the northern Alaska Range, southwest of Mount Deborah, approximately 100 mi (160 km) south of Fairbanks. It flows briefly southwest, then west, then north, forming the eastern boundary of Denali National Park and Preserve. It emerges from the mountains onto the broad marshy Tanana Valley, joining the Tanana River from the south at Nenana, Alaska, approximately 35 miles (56 km) southwest of Fairbanks. The Tanana River continues to its confluence with the Yukon River.

The upper valley of the river furnishes approximately 100 mi (160 km) of the northern route of both the Alaska Railroad and the Parks Highway (Alaska State Highway 3) connecting Fairbanks and Anchorage.

The Nenana supports populations of Alaska blackfish, Arctic grayling, Arctic lamprey, broad whitefish, burbot, chum salmon, humpback whitefish, king salmon, lake chubs, least cisco, longnose suckers, northern pike, round whitefish, sheefish, silver salmon, and slimy sculpins. Major archaeological sites located in the valley include Broken Mammoth and Swan Point, of late Pleistocene age.

== Name origin ==
Lieutenant Henry Allen of the U.S. Army explored the river in 1887. He named it the Cantwell River after Lieutenant John C. Cantwell, of the Revenue Cutter Service, who had explored the Kobuk River region in 1884–85. In 1898, members of the United States Geological Survey reported that people living along the river called it Tutlut. However, the local Tanana name was spelled Nenana on a later map. A century later, linguist William Bright wrote that the river's name derived from the Lower Tanana (Athabascan) word, neenano', meaning the "stopping-while-migrating stream".

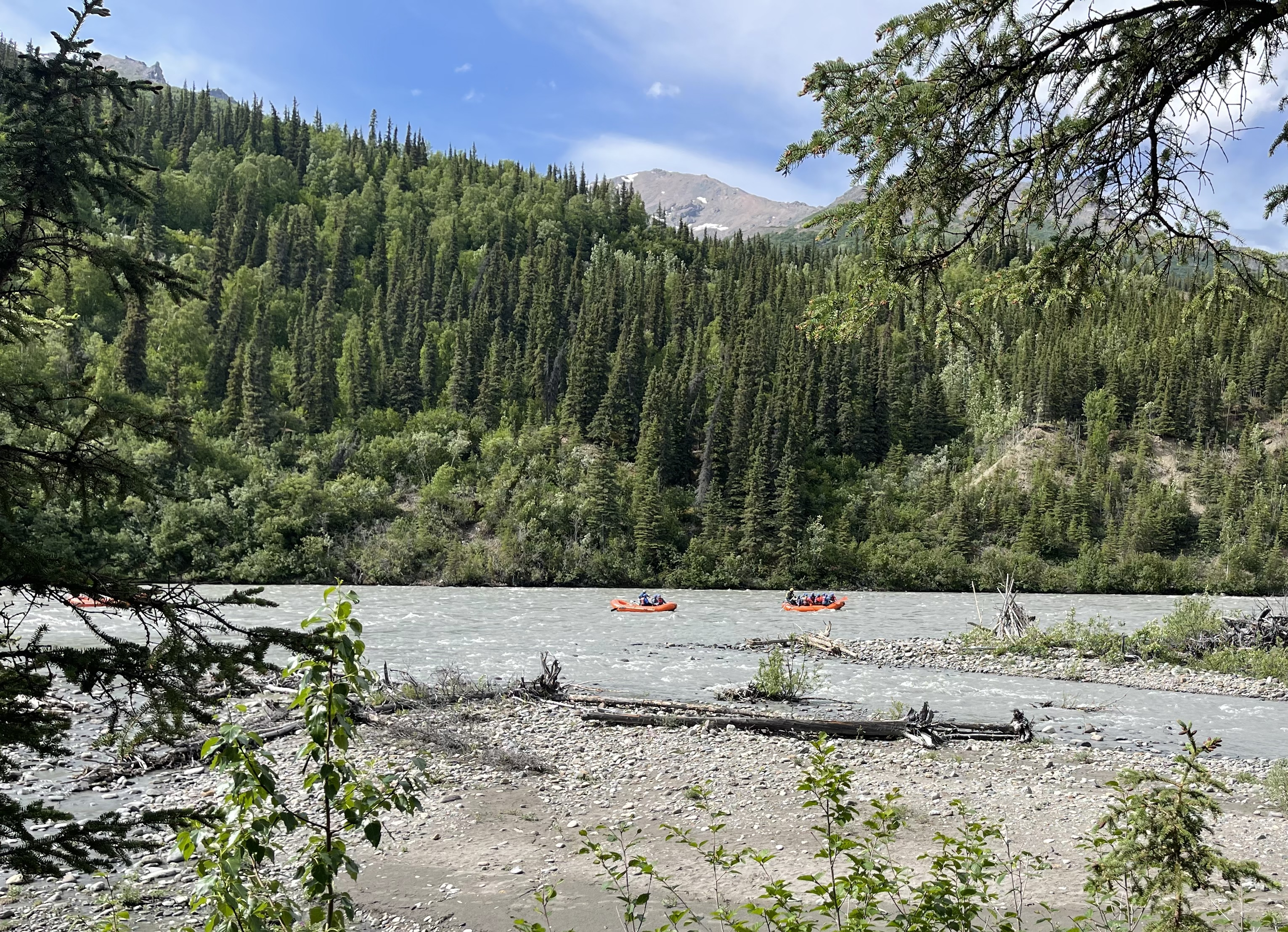
Rafting the Nenana River

== Boating ==
The river is one of the most popular destinations for boating and whitewater rafting in Alaska. Thousands of users, some on commercial cruises and others on private trips, travel on the river each year. The proximity of the Denali Highway, which runs parallel to the upper river for about 15 miles (24 km), and the Parks Highway, which follows the river for 80 miles (130 km), makes the river accessible at many places.

The river begins as a Class I (easy) rafting stream on the International Scale of River Difficulty. Jetboats and other craft ply the waters along the Denali Highway. Below this, however, the flow rate increases, and the Nenana becomes a Class I to II (medium) stream for the 38 miles (61 km) between Windy Station and McKinley Village Lodge. The most difficult whitewater, for experts only, occurs over the next 23 miles (37 km), in Nenana Gorge between McKinley Village and Healy, and is rated Class IV (very difficult). Below this, the river is Class I or II all the way to Nenana.

Dangers include extremely cold swift water, Class IV rapids in the gorge, overhanging trees along the upper river, and overhangs, logjams, and braids on the lower river. An additional danger at the river mouth involves following the wrong braid, missing the take-out at Nenana, and being swept into the Tanana River, from which it may not be possible to exit until reaching Manley Hot Springs, 90 miles (140 km) further downstream.

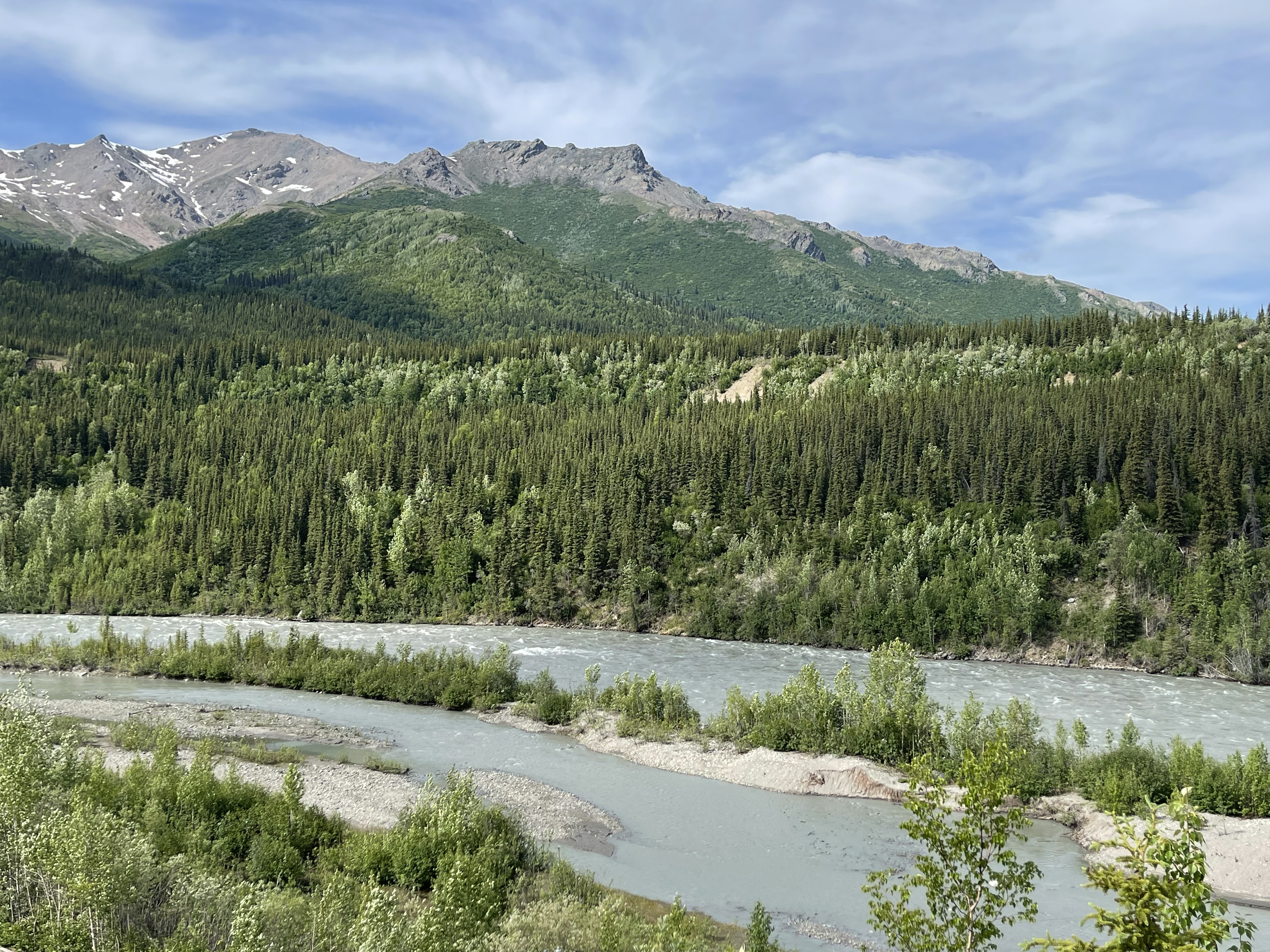
The Nenana River in June 2022

== Crossings ==
Location	River elevation	Remarks	Coordinates
Mile 216 George Parks Highway	2020 ft	Known unofficially as “Number One Bridge”	63°27′24″N 148°48′16″W
Mile 231.2 George Parks Highway	1800 ft	Crabbie's Crossing	63°39′22″N 148°50′11″W
Mile 238 George Parks Highway	1580 ft	0.7 miles north of Denali National Park access road. South extent of “Glitter Gulch” region.	63°44′14″N 148°53′12″W
Mile 242.9 George Parks Highway	1420 ft	Known as “Moody Bridge” or “Windy Bridge”; built 174 ft above river.	63°48′9″N 148°56′0″W
Healy Spur Road	1280 ft	East of Healy, Alaska, and south of Usibelli Coal Mine	63°51′15″N 148°57′21″W
Mile 275.8 George Parks Highway	680 ft	Jack Coghill Bridge to the Interior	64°13′5″N 149°16′51″W

== See also ==
- List of rivers of Alaska
