= George Parks Highway =

Highway in Alaska, United States

George Parks Highway
- George Parks Highway highlighted in red

Route information
- Maintained by Alaska DOT&PF
- Length: 323 mi (520 km)
- Existed: 1970s–present

Major junctions
- South end: AK-1 (Glenn Highway) in Gateway
- AK-8 (Denali Highway) in Cantwell
- North end: AK-2 (Richardson Highway) in Fairbanks

Location
- Country: United States
- State: Alaska
- Boroughs: Matanuska-Susitna, Denali, Fairbanks North Star

Highway system
- Alaska Routes; Interstate; Scenic Byways
← AK-2	→ AK-4

The George Parks Highway (numbered Interstate A-4 and signed Alaska Route 3), usually called simply the Parks Highway, runs 323 miles (520 km) from the Glenn Highway 35 miles (56 km) north of Anchorage to Fairbanks in the Alaska Interior. The highway, originally known as the Anchorage-Fairbanks Highway, was completed in 1971, and given its current name in 1975.

The highway, which mostly parallels the Alaska Railroad, is one of the most important roads in Alaska. It is the main route between Anchorage and Fairbanks (Alaska's two largest metropolitan areas), the principal access to Denali National Park and Preserve and Denali State Park, and the main highway in the Matanuska-Susitna Valley. The route's Interstate designation is not signed; rather, its entire length is signed as Alaska Route 3.

It is a common misconception that the name "Parks Highway" comes from the road's proximity to the Denali state and national parks; it is in fact in honor of George Alexander Parks, governor of the Territory of Alaska from 1925 to 1933. However, the aptness of the name was recognized when it was chosen.

Mileposts along the Parks Highway do not begin with 0 (zero). Instead, they begin with Mile 35 (km 56), continuing the milepost numbering of the Glenn Highway where the two highways intersect near Palmer. The 0 (zero) mile marker for the Glenn Highway is at its terminus in downtown Anchorage at the intersection of East 5th Avenue and Gambell Street. Thus mileposts along the Parks Highway reflect distance from Anchorage, which is not actually on the Parks Highway.

There are two sections of the highway that are built to freeway standards. These include an area near the highway's intersection with the Glenn Highway in Palmer and a stretch known as the Robert J. Mitchell Expressway in Fairbanks leading to the highway's junction with the Richardson Highway (AK 2).

== Interstate Highway System ==
Interstate A-4
- Location: Palmer to Fairbanks
- Length: 323.69 mi (520.93 km)
- Existed: 1976–present

George Parks Highway is part of the unsigned part of the Interstate Highway System as Interstate A-4.

== Exit list ==
In the "Mile" column, the first number is the actual mileage of the Parks Highway, and the second mile is based on the mileposts along the highway itself.
All exits are unnumbered.

Borough	Location	mi	km	Destinations	Notes
Matanuska-Susitna	Gateway	0.00– 35	0.00– 56	AK-1 south (Glenn Highway)	Interchange, East end of Wasilla freeway section
Matanuska-Susitna	Gateway			Trunk Road	Interchange
Matanuska-Susitna	Gateway	2.58– 37.58	4.15– 60.48	Fairview Loop / Hyer Road	Interchange
Matanuska-Susitna	Lakes			Seward-Meridian Parkway	Interchange
Matanuska-Susitna	Wasilla	3.66– 38.66	5.89– 62.22	West end of Wasilla freeway section	
Matanuska-Susitna	Wasilla			Palmer-Wasilla Highway	
Matanuska-Susitna	Wasilla			Museum Drive	To New Wasilla Airport
Matanuska-Susitna	Houston			Big Lake Road	To Big Lake
Matanuska-Susitna	Denali State Park			Entering Denali State Park	
Matanuska-Susitna	Denali State Park			Exiting Denali State Park	
Denali	Cantwell			AK-8 east (Denali Highway)	Denali Highway continues a short distance west to the Cantwell Airport.
Denali	Denali National Park and Preserve			Entrance to Denali National Park and Preserve	
Fairbanks North Star	College			West end of Fairbanks freeway section	
Fairbanks North Star	College	317.65– 352.62	511.21– 567.49	Geist Road / Chena Pump Road—University of Alaska	Interchange
Fairbanks North Star	College	318.81– 353.81	513.07– 569.40	Airport Way west— Fairbanks International Airport	Interchange; Beginning of the Robert Mitchell Expressway
Fairbanks North Star	College	318.81– 353.81	513.07– 569.40	Airport Way east	Interchange; Southbound exit is via Old Airport Road
Fairbanks North Star	College	319.73– 354.73	514.56– 570.88	University Avenue	
Fairbanks North Star	Fairbanks	321.94– 356.94	518.11– 574.44	Peger Road	
Fairbanks North Star	Fairbanks	322– 357.95	518– 576.06	Lathrop Street	
Fairbanks North Star	Fairbanks			Cushman Street / Old Richardson Highway	Interchange; Northbound exit and southbound entrance; Access via 30th Avenue from northbound roadway and via 28th Avenue from southbound roadway
Fairbanks North Star	Fairbanks	323– 358	520– 576	AK-2 (Richardson Highway) – North Pole, Delta Junction	Interchange; Northbound exit and southbound entrance
1.000 mi = 1.609 km; 1.000 km = 0.621 mi: Incomplete access

== Gallery ==
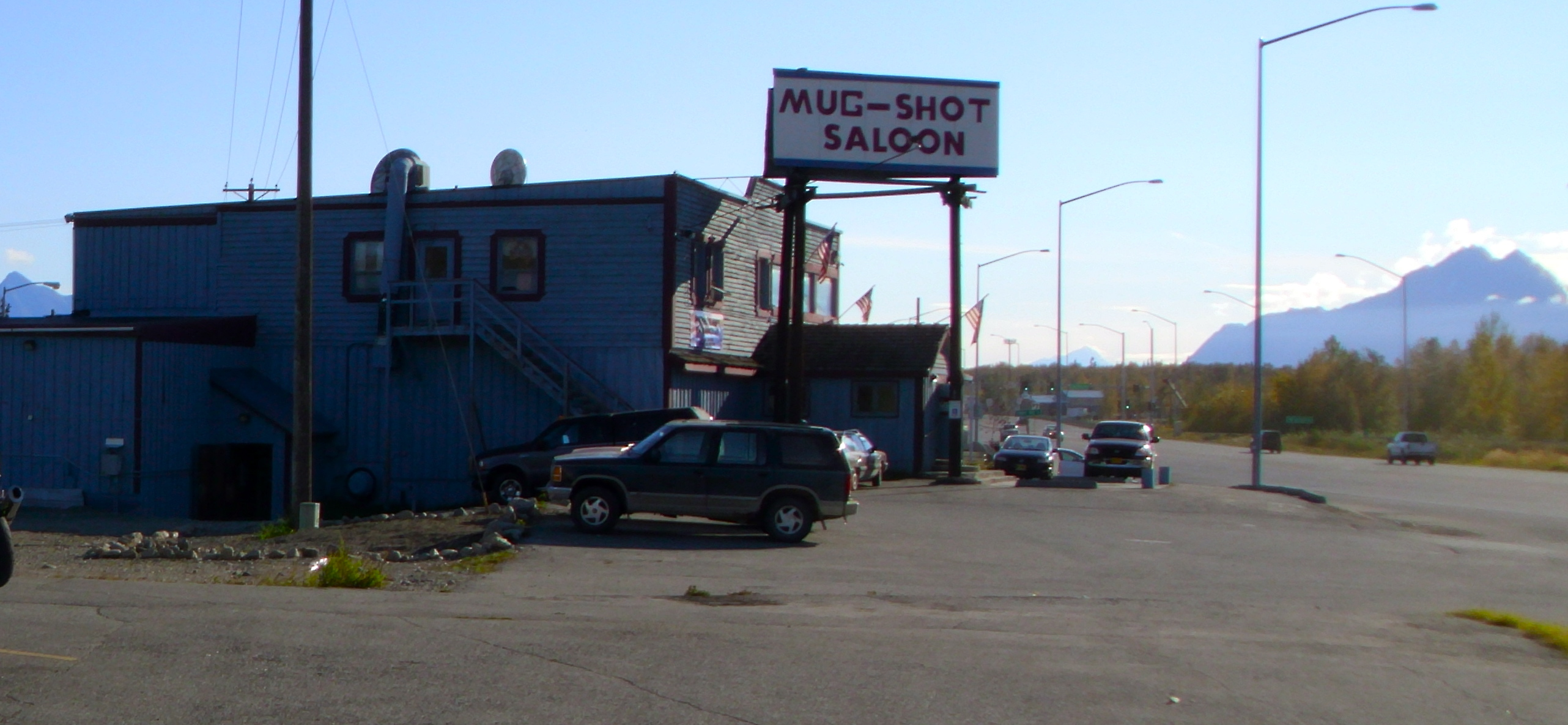
The multi-lane Parks Highway is seen at right as it passes by a downtown Wasilla business.

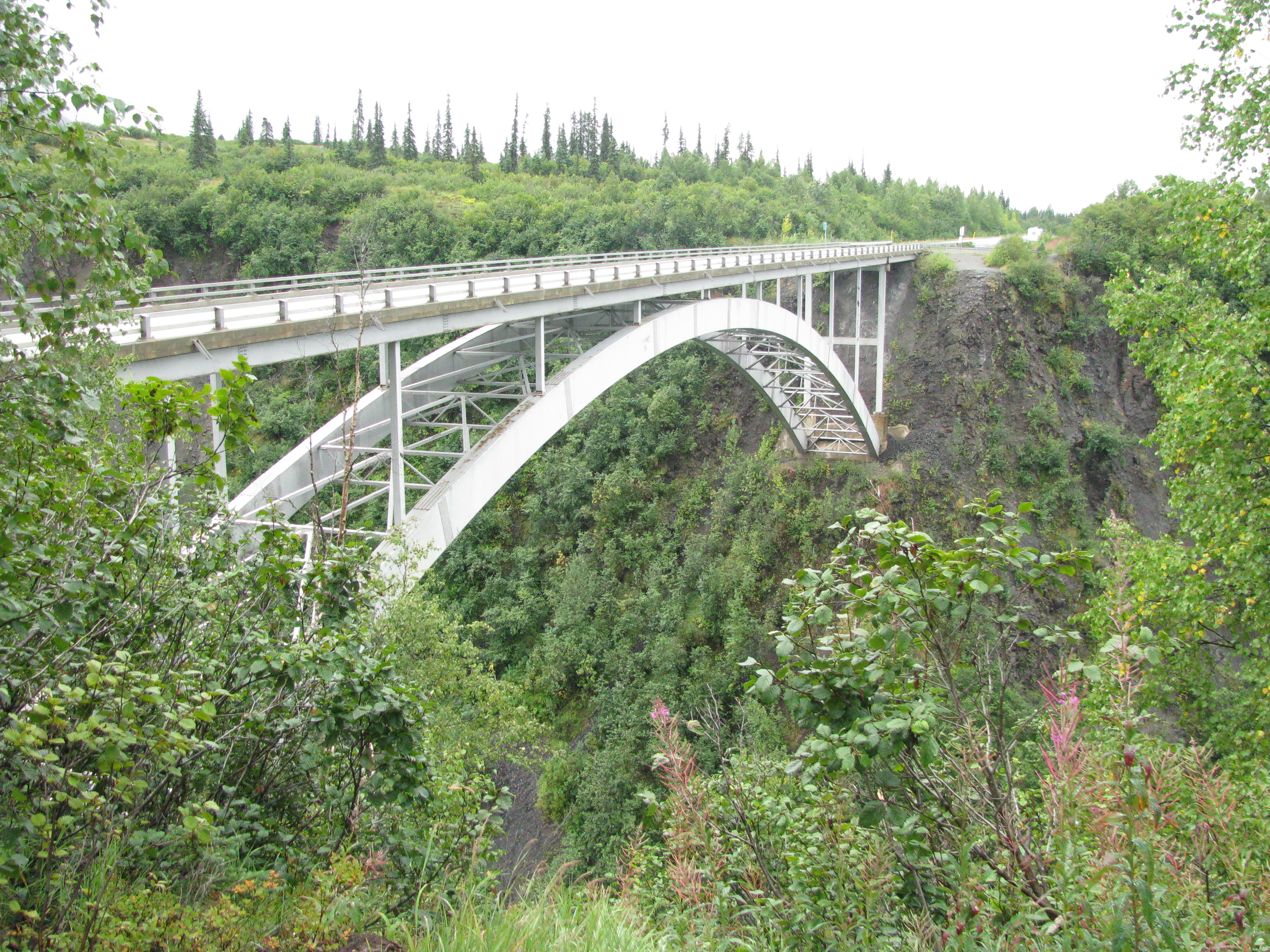
The highway's bridge over Hurricane Gulch.

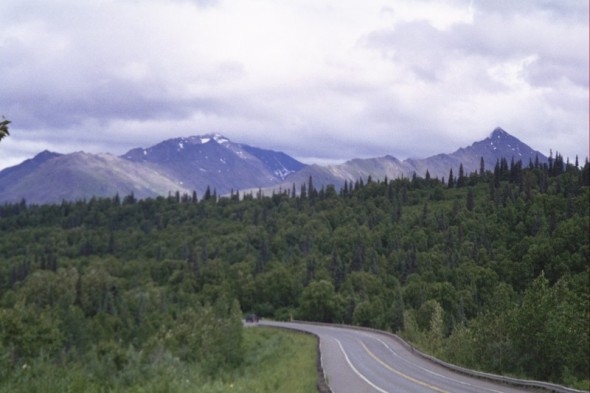
The Parks Highway near Hurricane, Alaska.

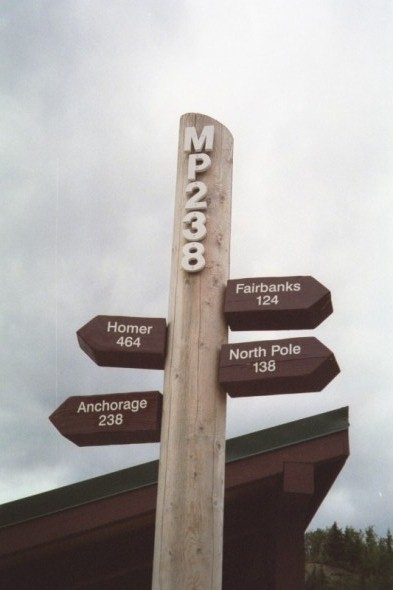
Milepost 238 signpost in Denali Park. The signpost is located in a turnout adjacent to a bridge crossing the Nenana River and near the entrance to Denali National Park.

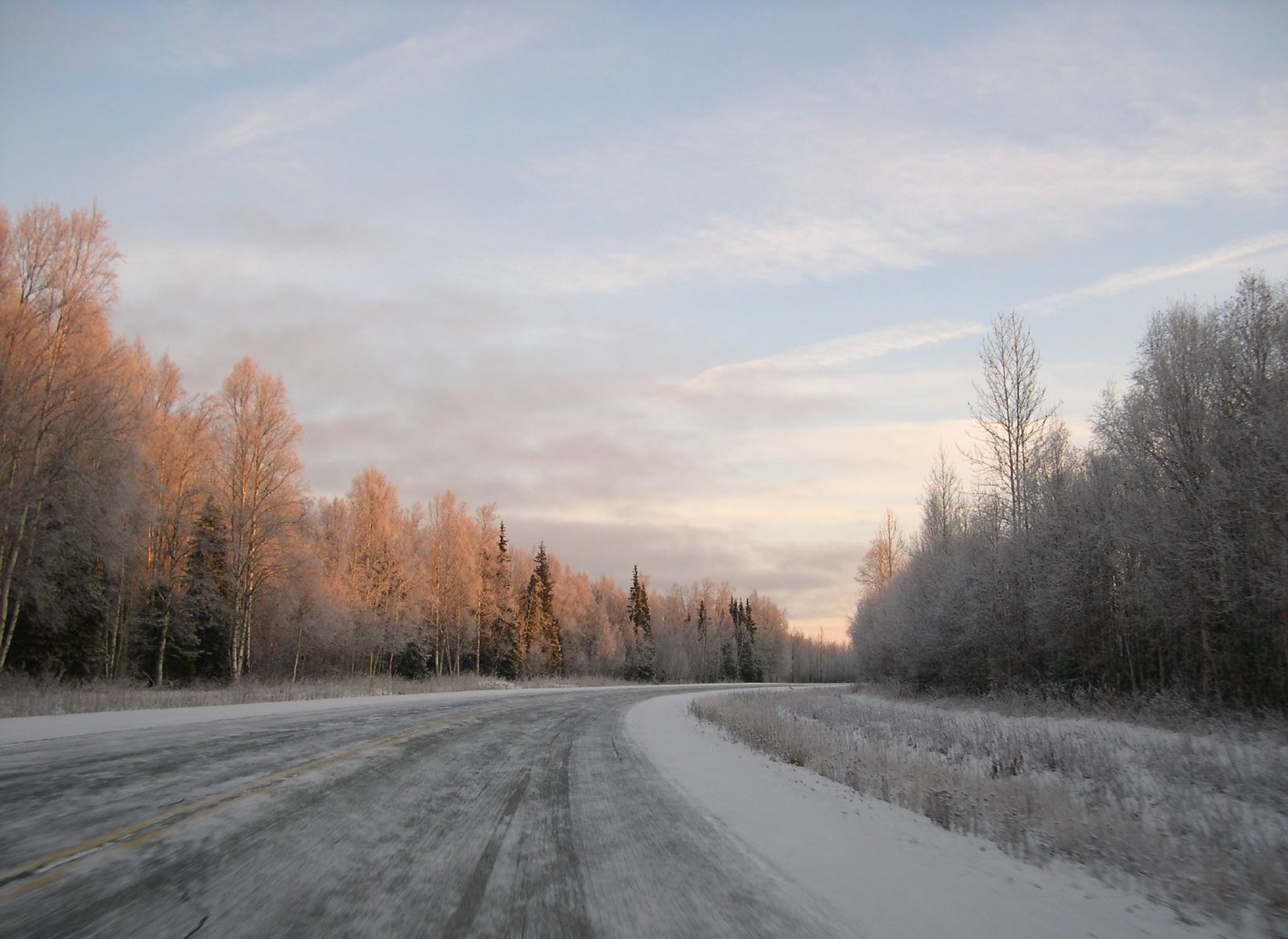
View of the Parks Highway in early autumn, looking northbound.

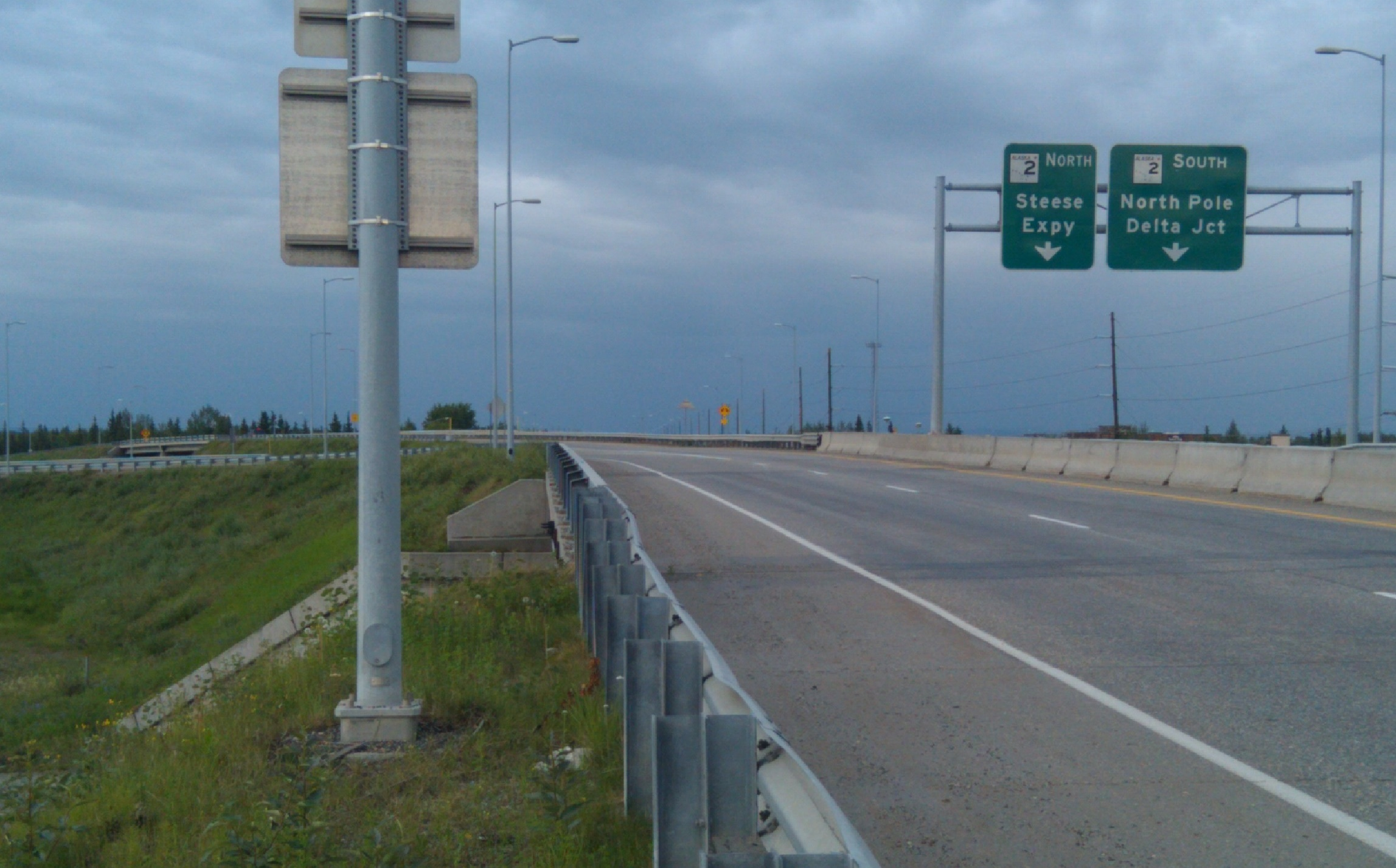
The northern terminus of the highway in Fairbanks. View looking easterly from just west of the South Cushman Street overpass.

== See also ==
- Tornio Highway
