= Healy, Alaska =

Census-designated place in Alaska

- Census-designated place
- Denali Dome Bed and Breakfast

- Location in Denali Borough and the state of Alaska.
- Coordinates: 63°58′15″N 149°7′37″W
- Country: United States
- State: Alaska
- Borough: Denali
- Named for: John Healy

Government
  - Borough mayor: Christopher Noel
  - State senator: George Rauscher (R)
  - State rep.: Kevin McCabe (R)

Area
  - Total: 687.17 sq mi (1,779.75 km^{2})
  - Land: 686.96 sq mi (1,779.23 km^{2})
  - Water: 0.20 sq mi (0.53 km^{2})
- Elevation: 1,342 ft (409 m)

Population (2020)
  - Total: 966
  - Density: 1.4/sq mi (0.54/km^{2})
- Time zone: UTC−9 (Alaska (AKST))
  - Summer (DST): UTC−8 (AKDT)
- ZIP code: 99743
- Area code: 907
- FIPS code: 02-32150
- GNIS feature ID: 1403275

Healy is a census-designated place (CDP) and the borough seat of Denali Borough, Alaska. The population was 966 at the time of the 2020 census, down from 1,021 in 2010.

== History ==
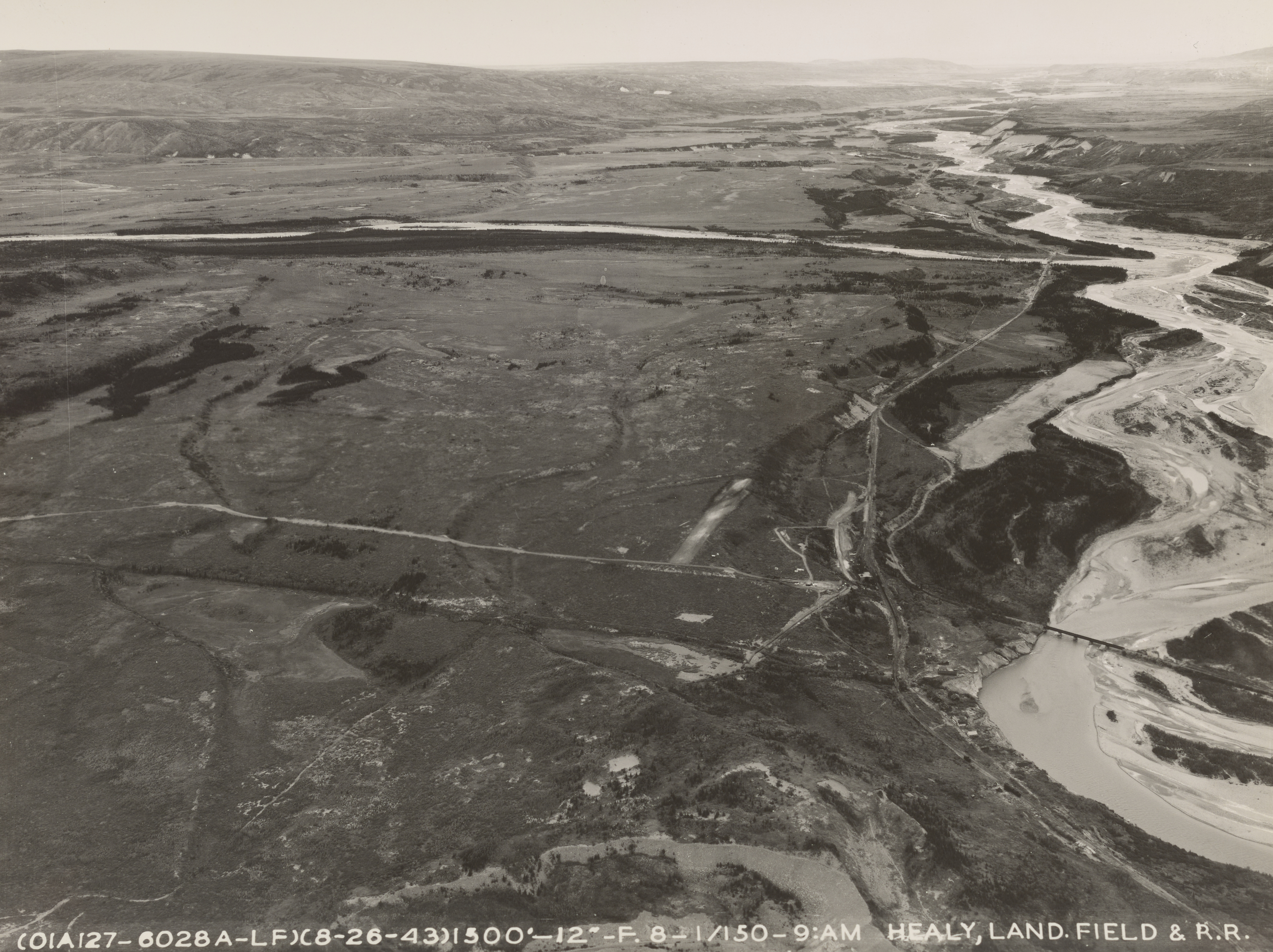
Healy in 1943

The history of Healy is intertwined with that of coal mining and construction of the Alaska Railroad, which both began in the area in 1918 and 1919 respectively.

Healy was originally named Healy Fork after the Healy River. The Healy River was named after John J. Healy, manager of the North American Trading and Transportation Company.

== Geography ==
Healy is located at 63°58′15″N 149°7′37″W (63.970833, -149.126944). The George Parks Highway (Alaska Route 3) runs through the community, leading south 18 miles (29 km) to Denali Park and north 56 miles (90 km) to Nenana.

According to the United States Census Bureau, the Healy CDP has a total area of 687.2 square miles (1,779.8 km^{2}), of which 687.0 square miles (1,779.2 km^{2}) is land and 0.19 square miles (0.5 km^{2}), or 0.03%, is water. By area, it is the second-largest CDP in the United States, exceeded by only Willow, Alaska.

== Climate ==
As is typical of the Alaska Interior, Healy experiences a subarctic climate (Köppen Dfc) with very long, bitterly cold winters and short, warm summers, and straddles the border between USDA Plant Hardiness Zone 2 and 3, indicating the coldest temperature of the year is typically around −40 °F (−40 °C). Average temperatures are below freezing from early October to mid-April, though occasionally chinook winds will push temperatures up to 45 °F (7.2 °C) even in the depths of winter.

Climate data for Healy, Alaska (1991–2020 normals, extremes 1976–2017)
| Month | Jan | Feb | Mar | Apr | May | Jun | Jul | Aug | Sep | Oct | Nov | Dec | Year |
|---|---|---|---|---|---|---|---|---|---|---|---|---|---|
| Record high °F (°C) | 52 (11) | 59 (15) | 64 (18) | 69 (21) | 85 (29) | 93 (34) | 90 (32) | 90 (32) | 74 (23) | 71 (22) | 54 (12) | 51 (11) | 93 (34) |
| Mean maximum °F (°C) | 40.6 (4.8) | 45.9 (7.7) | 46.3 (7.9) | 60.1 (15.6) | 73.2 (22.9) | 82.6 (28.1) | 82.0 (27.8) | 77.2 (25.1) | 66.8 (19.3) | 55.4 (13.0) | 43.3 (6.3) | 40.5 (4.7) | 85.1 (29.5) |
| Mean daily maximum °F (°C) | 8.0 (−13.3) | 18.3 (−7.6) | 23.6 (−4.7) | 41.0 (5.0) | 55.9 (13.3) | 66.5 (19.2) | 67.3 (19.6) | 61.7 (16.5) | 50.8 (10.4) | 33.0 (0.6) | 15.8 (−9.0) | 11.6 (−11.3) | 37.8 (3.2) |
| Daily mean °F (°C) | −0.4 (−18.0) | 8.3 (−13.2) | 12.6 (−10.8) | 31.3 (−0.4) | 45.4 (7.4) | 55.5 (13.1) | 58.0 (14.4) | 52.9 (11.6) | 42.7 (5.9) | 25.5 (−3.6) | 8.3 (−13.2) | 2.7 (−16.3) | 28.6 (−1.9) |
| Mean daily minimum °F (°C) | −8.8 (−22.7) | −1.6 (−18.7) | 1.7 (−16.8) | 21.6 (−5.8) | 34.9 (1.6) | 44.5 (6.9) | 48.6 (9.2) | 44.1 (6.7) | 34.6 (1.4) | 18.0 (−7.8) | 0.8 (−17.3) | −6.1 (−21.2) | 19.4 (−7.0) |
| Mean minimum °F (°C) | −37.9 (−38.8) | −28.8 (−33.8) | −22.4 (−30.2) | −1.0 (−18.3) | 21.0 (−6.1) | 33.9 (1.1) | 41.1 (5.1) | 31.8 (−0.1) | 17.9 (−7.8) | −2.7 (−19.3) | −20.1 (−28.9) | −29.9 (−34.4) | −40.0 (−40.0) |
| Record low °F (°C) | −56 (−49) | −51 (−46) | −40 (−40) | −25 (−32) | 4 (−16) | 27 (−3) | 32 (0) | 20 (−7) | −2 (−19) | −20 (−29) | −41 (−41) | −44 (−42) | −56 (−49) |
| Average precipitation inches (mm) | 0.53 (13) | 0.67 (17) | 0.36 (9.1) | 0.62 (16) | 0.87 (22) | 2.48 (63) | 3.04 (77) | 2.75 (70) | 1.57 (40) | 0.95 (24) | 0.70 (18) | 0.84 (21) | 15.38 (390.1) |
| Average snowfall inches (cm) | 10.9 (28) | 7.6 (19) | 8.3 (21) | 4.7 (12) | 1.4 (3.6) | 0.0 (0.0) | 0.0 (0.0) | 0.0 (0.0) | 1.3 (3.3) | 12.1 (31) | 15.1 (38) | 14.8 (38) | 76.2 (193.9) |
| Average extreme snow depth inches (cm) | 14.9 (38) | 15.3 (39) | 14.6 (37) | 12.2 (31) | 2.6 (6.6) | 0.0 (0.0) | 0.0 (0.0) | 0.0 (0.0) | 1.8 (4.6) | 9.4 (24) | 12.5 (32) | 14.8 (38) | 20.9 (53) |
| Average precipitation days (≥ 0.01 in) | 7.3 | 5.9 | 5.5 | 3.8 | 6.7 | 11.5 | 13.7 | 13.2 | 9.4 | 9.7 | 9.5 | 8.7 | 104.9 |
| Average snowy days (≥ 0.1 in) | 6.8 | 5.0 | 4.5 | 2.0 | 0.7 | 0.0 | 0.0 | 0.0 | 0.8 | 6.2 | 8.4 | 7.4 | 41.9 |
Source: NOAA (snow depth 1981–2010)

== Economy ==
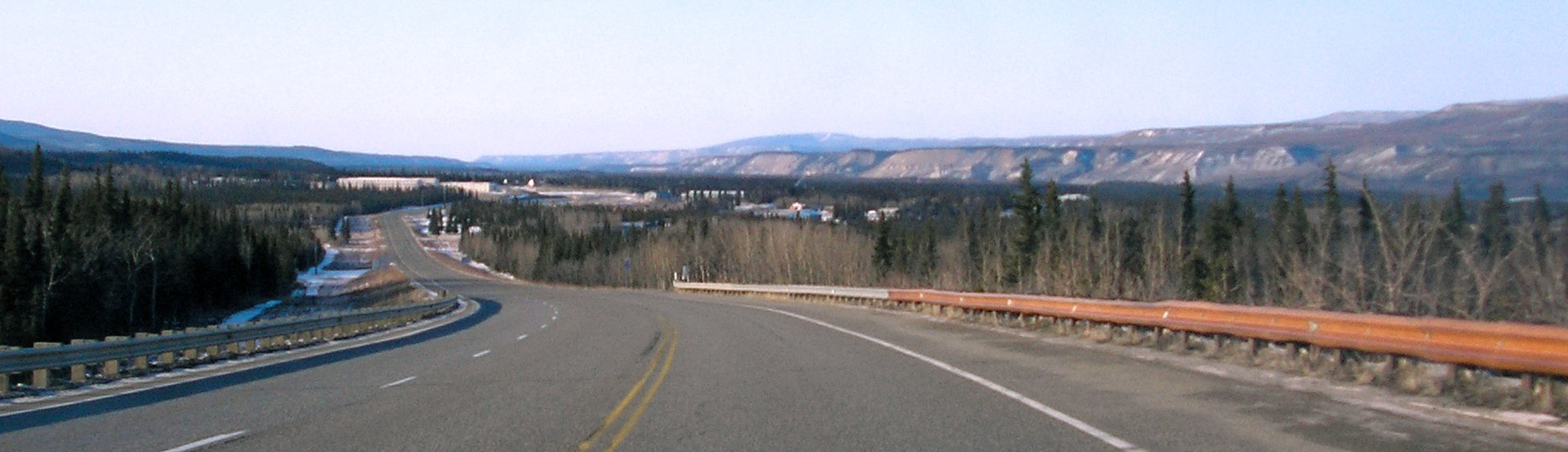
Healy from Parks Highway

Usibelli Coal Mine, Golden Valley Electric Association, the Denali Borough School District, and the National Park Service are the major employers in Healy. Proximity to Denali National Park & Preserve supports local RV parks, hotels, restaurants, bed and breakfast, and other small businesses. The Denali Chamber of Commerce represents the economic interests of Healy and the Denali Borough, Alaska. The 24 MW Eva Creek Wind Farm opened in 2013, 12 miles north of Healy.

== Demographics ==
Historical population
| Census | Pop. | Note | %± |
|---|---|---|---|
| 1930 | 36 | | — |
| 1940 | 46 | | 27.8% |
| 1950 | 102 | | 121.7% |
| 1960 | 67 | | −34.3% |
| 1970 | 79 | | 17.9% |
| 1980 | 334 | | 322.8% |
| 1990 | 487 | | 45.8% |
| 2000 | 1,000 | | 105.3% |
| 2010 | 1,021 | | 2.1% |
| 2020 | 966 | | −5.4% |
U.S. Decennial Census

Healy first appeared on the 1930 U.S. Census as the unincorporated community of "Healey Fork." In 1940, it appeared as Healy Fork. It was shortened to *Healy beginning in 1950. It was made a census-designated place (CDP) in 1980.

- Note there was also another locale named "Healey (Healy) Village" on the 1930 & 1940 U.S. Censuses (with a population of 16 and 77, respectively). It was stated that this place was located in the Fairbanks Recording District rather than Nenana (where then Healy Fork was located). It is unclear whether this was a geographic error on the census and both places were located at or around Healy Fork and merged in 1950, or if the former was a native village on or near present-day Healy Lake (within Southeast Fairbanks Census Area).

At the 2000 census there were 1,000 people, 436 households, and 245 families in the CDP. The population density was 1.5 people per square mile (0.58 people/km^{2}). There were 604 housing units at an average density of 0.9 units per square mile (0.35 units/km^{2}). The racial makeup of the CDP was 90.20% White, 0.30% Black or African American, 2.30% Native American, 1.90% Asian, 0.70% Pacific Islander, 0.80% from other races, and 3.80% from two or more races. 2.00%. were Hispanic or Latino of any race.

Of the 436 households 33.9% had children under the age of 18 living with them, 48.4% were married couples living together, 3.0% had a female householder with no husband present, and 43.6% were non-families. 37.6% of households were one person and 0.9% were one person aged 65 or older. The average household size was 2.29 and the average family size was 3.12.

The age distribution was 27.4% under the age of 18, 5.5% from 18 to 24, 34.3% from 25 to 44, 30.6% from 45 to 64, and 2.2% 65 or older. The median age was 38 years. For every 100 females, there were 132.0 males. For every 100 females age 18 and over, there were 142.8 males.

The median household income was $60,000 and the median family income was $77,806. Males had a median income of $65,729 versus $30,227 for females. The per capita income for the CDP was $28,225. About 2.5% of families and 4.9% of the population were below the poverty line, including 3.9% of those under age 18 and none of those age 65 or over.

== Education ==
K-12 students attend Tri-Valley School, operated by the Denali Borough School District. The district is headquartered in Healy.

== Stampede Trail Bus ==
Just outside of Healy, (Approximately 15 miles) near the Stampede Trail, is the former location of the bus that Christopher McCandless occupied during his fatal excursion. Fairbanks City Transit bus 142 drew others into the same wilderness, and seeking it out has ultimately lead to the deaths of two people. The bus has since been airlifted and transported to the University of Alaska Museum of the North (Antonette, 2021)

== See also ==
- Healy Clean Coal Project
