= Denali Borough, Alaska =

Borough in Alaska, United States

- Borough
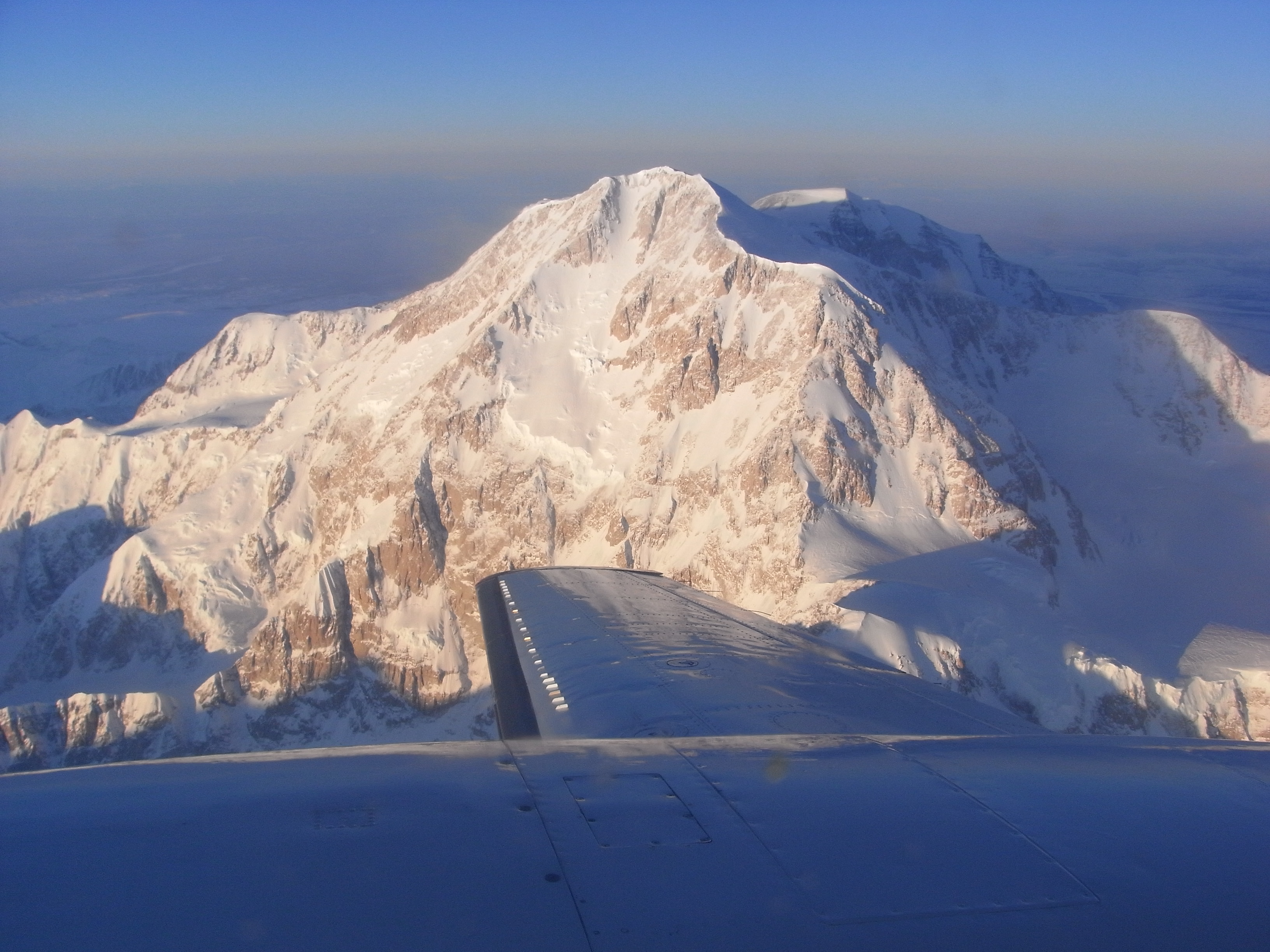
- Denali, federally designated as Mount McKinley

- Seal

- Location within the U.S. state of Alaska
- Coordinates: 63°47′20″N 150°11′30″W
- Country: United States
- State: Alaska
- Incorporated: December 7, 1990
- Named for: Denali
- Seat: Healy
- Largest CDP: Healy

Area
  - Total: 12,777 sq mi (33,090 km^{2})
  - Land: 12,751 sq mi (33,020 km^{2})
  - Water: 26 sq mi (67 km^{2}) 0.2%

Population (2020)
  - Total: 1,619
  - Estimate (2025): 1,616 ▼
  - Density: 0.1270/sq mi (0.04902/km^{2})
- Time zone: UTC−9 (Alaska)
  - Summer (DST): UTC−8 (ADT)
- Congressional district: at-large
- Website: denaliborough.org

The Denali Borough is a borough located in the U.S. state of Alaska. As of the 2020 census, the population of the borough was 1,619, down from 1,826 in 2010. The borough seat and most populated community is Healy, and its only incorporated place is Anderson. The borough was incorporated in December 1990.

The area was previously a part of the Unorganized Borough, with the Upper Railbelt School District serving as the region's rural education attendance area (which was replaced by a school district under the borough's umbrella upon incorporation).

The earliest inhabitants were nomadic native Alaskans. A mining camp was established near Healy prior to 1902, and construction of the Alaska Railroad brought additional settlers to the area in the early 1920s. Clear Space Force Station, the Usibelli Coal Mine and tourism at the Denali National Park and Preserve have brought growth and development.

== Geography ==
The borough has a total area of 12,777 square miles (33,090 km^{2}), of which 12,751 square miles (33,020 km^{2}) is land and 26 square miles (67 km^{2}) (0.2%) is water.

The borough contains North America's highest point: Denali (federally Mount McKinley), from which it derives its name, at 6,190.5 m (20,310 ft).

=== National protected area ===
- Denali National Park and Preserve (part)
  - Denali Wilderness (part)

=== Adjacent boroughs and census areas ===
- Yukon-Koyukuk Census Area - west/north
- Fairbanks North Star Borough - northeast
- Southeast Fairbanks Census Area - east
- Matanuska-Susitna Borough - south

== Demographics ==
Historical population
Census	Pop.	Note	%±
2000	1,893		—
2010	1,826		−3.5%
2020	1,619		−11.3%
2025 (est.)	1,616	▼	−0.2%
U.S. Decennial Census; 1990–2000 2010–2019

=== 2020 census ===
As of the 2020 census, the borough had a population of 1,619. The median age was 43.0 years, 20.3% of residents were under the age of 18, and 15.0% of residents were 65 years of age or older. For every 100 females there were 109.7 males, and for every 100 females age 18 and over there were 112.0 males.

The racial makeup of the borough was 85.4% White, 0.7% Black or African American, 3.8% American Indian and Alaska Native, 0.8% Asian, 0.3% Native Hawaiian and Pacific Islander, 0.5% from some other race, and 8.6% from two or more races. Hispanic or Latino residents of any race comprised 2.0% of the population.

0.0% of residents lived in urban areas, while 100.0% lived in rural areas.

There were 748 households, of which 26.9% had children under the age of 18 living with them and 18.3% had a female householder with no spouse or partner present. About 36.8% of all households were made up of individuals and 9.7% had someone living alone who was 65 years of age or older.

There were 1,606 housing units, of which 53.4% were vacant. Among occupied housing units, 72.7% were owner-occupied and 27.3% were renter-occupied. The homeowner vacancy rate was 3.2% and the rental vacancy rate was 29.4%.

=== Racial and ethnic composition ===
Denali Borough, Alaska – Racial and ethnic composition Note: the US Census treats Hispanic/Latino as an ethnic category. This table excludes Latinos from the racial categories and assigns them to a separate category. Hispanics/Latinos may be of any race.
Race / Ethnicity (NH = Non-Hispanic)	Pop 2000	Pop 2010	Pop 2020	% 2000	% 2010	% 2020
White alone (NH)	1,600	1,614	1,378	84.52%	88.39%	85.11%
Black or African American alone (NH)	27	10	9	1.43%	0.55%	0.56%
Native American or Alaska Native alone (NH)	89	64	59	4.70%	3.50%	3.64%
Asian alone (NH)	26	19	13	1.37%	1.04%	0.80%
Native Hawaiian or Pacific Islander alone (NH)	6	1	3	0.32%	0.05%	0.19%
Other race alone (NH)	4	5	4	0.21%	0.27%	0.25%
Mixed race or Multiracial (NH)	94	71	121	4.97%	3.89%	7.47%
Hispanic or Latino (any race)	47	42	32	2.48%	2.30%	1.98%
Total	1,893	1,826	1,619	100.00%	100.00%	100.00%

The most reported ancestries from the 2020 census were:

- German (20.4%)
- English (15.6%)
- Irish (14.8%)
- Scottish (5.5%)
- Italian (5.4%)
- Norwegian (4.9%)
- Swedish (3.7%)
- French (3.5%)
- Polish (2.2%)
- Mexican (2.1%)

=== 2000 census ===
At the 2000 census there were 1,893 people, 785 households, and 452 families residing in the borough. The population density was 0.148 people per square mile (0.057 people/km^{2}). There were 1,351 housing units at an average density of 0.106 per square mile (0.041/km^{2}). The racial makeup of the borough was 85.74% White, 1.43% Black or African American, 4.75% Native American, 1.53% Asian, 0.37% Pacific Islander, 0.95% from other races, and 5.23% from two or more races. Of the population, 2.48% were Hispanic or Latino of any race.

Of the 785 households, 31.00% had children under the age of 18 living with them, 48.40% were married couples living together, 4.50% had a female householder with no husband present, and 42.30% were non-families. 35.00% of households were one person and 1.40% were one person aged 65 or older. The average household size was 2.28 and the average family size was 3.03.

The age distribution was 23.80% under the age of 18, 6.70% from 18 to 24, 36.80% from 25 to 44, 29.70% from 45 to 64, and 3.10% 65 or older. The median age was 38 years. For every 100 females, there were 139.00 males. For every 100 females age 18 and over, there were 147.10 males.

=== Income ===
Denali Borough is the 63rd highest-income county in the United States, and the highest-income county in Alaska, by personal per capita income as of 2009.

== Politics ==
Apart from the two Democratic victories in 1960 and 1964, Denali Borough was carried by Republicans in presidential elections except in 1992, when it was carried by independent candidate Ross Perot. However, Democrats usually achieve around 40% of the vote.

Downballot, Denali is a swing county in gubernatorial elections, and has rarely voted for the same party twice in a row.

United States presidential election results for Denali Borough, Alaska
Year	Republican		Democratic		Third party(ies)	
Year	No.	%	No.	%	No.	%
1960	68	38.42%	109	61.58%	0	0.00%
1964	240	43.56%	311	56.44%	0	0.00%
1968	282	45.78%	197	31.98%	137	22.24%
1972	370	60.76%	196	32.18%	43	7.06%
1976	402	57.10%	244	34.66%	58	8.24%
1980	442	53.58%	172	20.85%	211	25.58%
1984	638	70.19%	225	24.75%	46	5.06%
1988	520	58.10%	313	34.97%	62	6.93%
1992	335	29.52%	363	31.98%	437	38.50%
1996	249	46.72%	239	44.84%	45	8.44%
2000	447	73.28%	112	18.36%	51	8.36%
2004	314	74.41%	98	23.22%	10	2.37%
2008	637	51.45%	569	45.96%	32	2.58%
2012	292	53.19%	234	42.62%	23	4.19%
2016	576	49.36%	451	38.65%	140	12.00%
2020	666	50.11%	606	45.60%	57	4.29%
2024	754	58.40%	484	37.49%	53	4.11%

== Communities ==
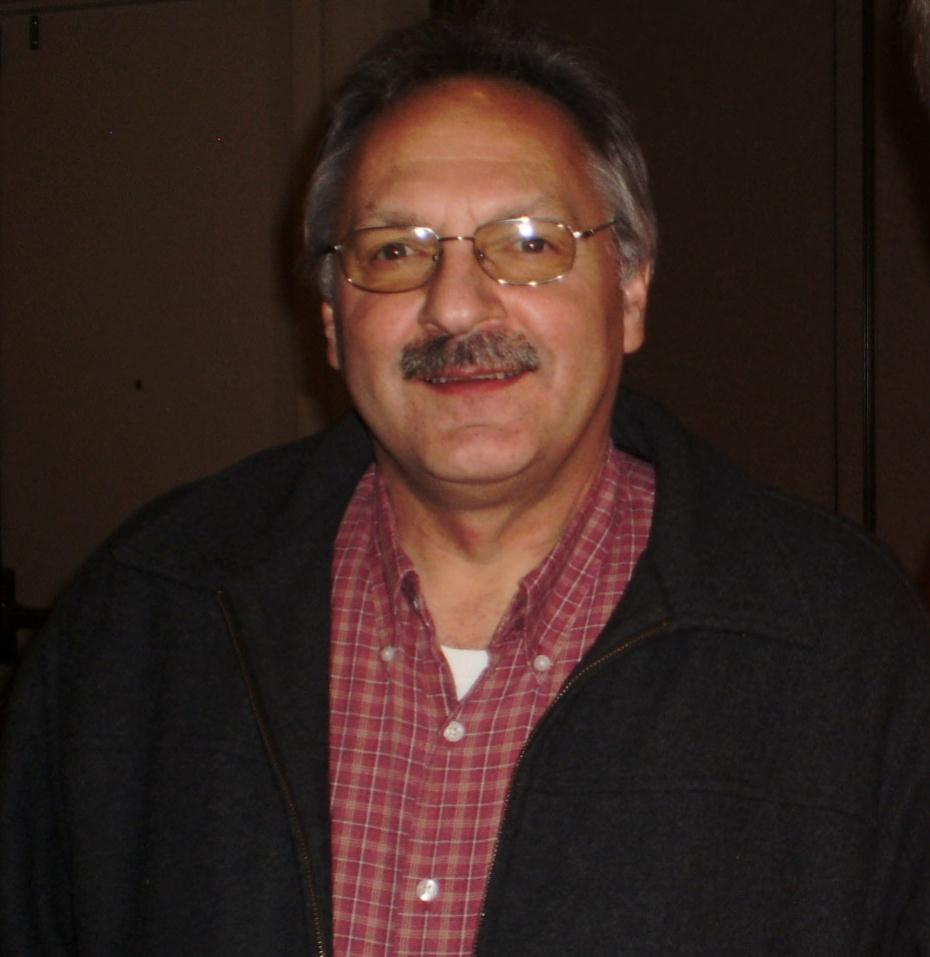
Dave Talerico represented the Denali Borough and surrounding regions in the 29th, 30th, and 31st Legislature's of the Alaska House of Representatives. Talerico took office in 2015, becoming the first Denali Borough resident to serve in the Alaska Legislature since 1993. Prior to that, he was the borough's longest-serving mayor, from 2002 until resigning in 2012 to take a staff position in the legislature.

=== City ===
- Anderson

=== Census-designated places ===
- Cantwell
- Denali Park
- Ferry
- Healy (Borough seat)

=== Unincorporated communities ===
- Clear
- Kantishna
- Usibelli

=== Historical locations ===
- Diamond
- Suntrana

== Popular culture ==
In the Twilight Saga by Stephenie Meyer, the Denali vampire coven (consisting of Tanya, Kate, Irina, Eleazar and Carmen and later Garrett) lives in Denali because of the lack of sunlight.

The film Into the Wild, based on a book of the same name, featured a bus where Christopher McCandless died, which became a destination for film fans. The 1940s bus was taken to a remote trail about 60 years ago (from 2020) by a road crew, according to Denali Borough Mayor Clay Walker. Visitors to the site had to cross the Teklanika River. In 2019 a newlywed Belarusian woman drowned trying to cross the swollen river on her way to the site. Another drowning took place in 2010. A stranded Brazilian had to be rescued in April 2020 and five Italians were rescued in February 2020, with one suffering from severe frostbite. In total 15 bus-related search and rescue operations for visitors to the bus were carried out between 2009 and 2017. In June 2020 the bus was removed because of public safety concerns. It was air-lifted by a US army Chinook helicopter. Alaskan authorities are quoted as saying the bus would be kept in a "secure location" until a decision is made about its future. Clay Walker said, "It (the bus) is part of our history and it does feel a little bittersweet to see a piece of our history go down the road."

== See also ==
- List of airports in the Denali Borough
- National Register of Historic Places listings in Denali Borough, Alaska
