= Devil's Canyon =

Devil's Canyon may refer to:

== Arts and entertainment ==
- Devil's Canyon (1935 film), a 1935 Western film produced by Anthony J. Xydias
- Devil's Canyon (1953 film), a 1953 3-D Western film
- Rustlers of Devil's Canyon, a 1947 Western film
- Devil's Canyon (album), a 1996 album by Molly Hatchet

== Places ==
=== United States ===
Devil's Canyon may refer to many canyons in the United States, including:

- Devil's Canyon (Kiowa County, Oklahoma)
- Devil's Canyon (Canadian County, Oklahoma)
- Devils Canyon (Jacumba Mountains), San Diego County, California
- Devil Canyon, San Bernardino Mountains, California
- Devil's Canyon and Devil's Canyon Trail in San Gabriel Wilderness, Los Angeles County, California
- Devil's Canyon Wilderness - A federally designated wilderness area on the western edge of the San Rafael Swell in Emery County, Utah
- Devil's Canyon - north of the Lower Monumental Dam on the Snake River in Franklin County, Washington

=== Other places ===
- Devil's Canyon (Cañón del Diablo), a valley in Auyán-tepui, a mesa in Bolívar, Venezuela

== Other uses ==
- Devil's Canyon (CPU), an overclockable series of Intel CPUs that belongs to the Haswell Refresh CPU lineup
- Devil's Canyon Brewing Company, San Carlos, California
- Devil's Canyon Bridge, an Arizona bridge on the National Register of Historic Places
- Devil's Canyon Dam, the original name of the proposed Susitna Hydroelectric Project on the Susitna River, Alaska
