= Rampart =

Rampart may refer to:

- Rampart (fortification), a defensive wall or bank around a castle, fort or settlement

Rampart may also refer to:

- LAPD Rampart Division, a division of the Los Angeles Police Department
  - Rampart scandal, a blanket term for the widespread corruption of the Rampart Division
- Ramparts (magazine), a leftist American magazine that was published from 1962 through 1975
- Rampart Search and Rescue, Adams County, Colorado
- RampART Social Center, an anti-authoritarian social centre in Whitechapel, East London UK
- Rampart High School, a National School of Excellence in Colorado Springs, Colorado
- Ramparts (Lille Gate) Commonwealth War Graves Commission Cemetery in the Ypres Salient, Belgium
- RAMPART-A, a secret signals intelligence program led by the United States National Security Agency

== Places ==
- Ramparts of Quebec City, the only remaining fortified city walls in the Americas north of Mexico
- The Ramparts (Mackenzie River), 12 km of rapids on the Mackenzie River
- Rampart, Alaska, a village
  - Rampart Airport, near the village
  - Rampart Canyon (Alaska), on the Yukon River, named for the village
  - Rampart Dam, a canceled hydroelectric power project for Rampart Canyon
- Rampart, Los Angeles, California, in Los Angeles County
- Rampart crater, a type of crater on Mars
- The Ramparts (Canada), a mountain range in the Canadian Rockies
- Rampart Street in New Orleans, Louisiana
- Rampart Range, the region of mountains between Colorado Springs and Denver in Colorado

== Entertainment ==
- Rampart (video game), a 1990 action/strategy game
- Rampart (film), a 2011 film directed by Oren Moverman
- Rampart Records, see Eddie Davis (producer) (East L.A.)
- Rampart General Hospital, the fictional hospital of the Emergency! television series
- Rampart, a character in the Sovereign Seven comic book series
- Rampart Casino, at The Resort at Summerlin
- "Ramparts", instrumental from the 2001 album To Record Only Water for Ten Days by John Frusciante
- "Ramparts", from the 2003 album Zitilites by Danish rock band Kashmir
- Rampart, a town in the game Heroes of Might and Magic III
- Rampart, a character in the game Apex Legends
- Rampart (G.I. Joe), a fictional character in the G.I. Joe universe

== Sports ==
- Quebec Remparts, a Canadian junior ice hockey team
- Rampart Stakes, a thoroughbred horse race
