= Walter B. Parker =

Walter Parker
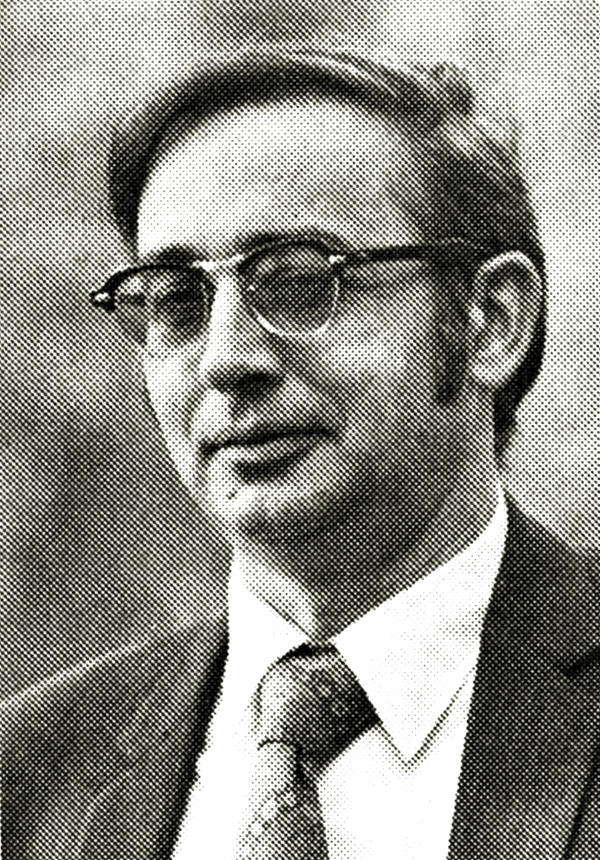
- Walt Parker as the Alaska highways commissioner in 1975.
- Born: August 11, 1926; Spokane, Washington, U.S.
- Died: June 25, 2014 (aged 87); Anchorage, Alaska, U.S.
- Spouse: Patricia Ertman Parker (1946–2001)
- Children: Sandra; Patrick; Jeffery; Douglas; Lisa

Walter Bruce "Walt" Parker (August 11, 1926 – June 25, 2014) was an American civil servant, policy adviser, transportation adviser, academic and local politician. Parker's career focused on the development of natural resources, transportation and infrastructure in Alaska from the 1940s to the 2000s. In 1989, Alaska Governor Steve Cowper appointed Parker as the chairman of the Alaska Oil Spill Commission, which investigated the Exxon Valdez oil spill. He is credited with making important contributions to the fields of transportation, telecommunications, education, land use and urban planning within the state of Alaska. Parker was inducted into the Alaska Conservation Hall of Fame by the Alaska Conservation Foundation in 2002 for his contributions to state conservation.

== Early and personal life ==
Walter Bruce Parker was born on August 11, 1926, in Spokane, Washington. His grandfather, who first arrived in the District of Alaska in the 1890s during the Nome Gold Rush, had helped to form to city of Nome, Alaska.

He served in the U.S. Navy during World War II. Parker married his wife, the former Patricia Isabelle Ertman, on January 28, 1946. A biologist with bachelor's and master's degrees from Alaska Methodist University, Patricia Parker became an adjunct professor at Alaska Methodist University and a biology teacher in the Anchorage School District. The couple had five children during their fifty-five year marriage: Sandra, Patrick, Jeffery, Douglas, and Lisa Parker.

In 1964, he received bachelor's degree in history and anthropology from the University of Alaska. Parker also studied at the University of Washington, completed a certificate in administrative management at Maxwell School of Citizenship and Public Affairs at Syracuse University, and took graduate courses at the Sino-Soviet Institute at George Washington University. The University of Alaska awarded him an honorary Doctorate of Science in 1997.

Parker bred sled dogs for more than sixty years. His dogs were a mix of husky, Alaskan Malamute, and Samoyed breeds.

== Career ==
Following the end of World War II, Parker was given the option of working for the federal government in either Alaska or China. He decided to transfer to a federal position in Alaska. In 1946, Parker and his wife moved to Fairbanks, Alaska, to take a position with the Civil Aeronautics Administration (CAA). He also worked for the Fairbanks Daily News-Miner and enrolled in college courses while living in Fairbanks. The CAA transferred Parker and his family to a weather station located at Lake Minchumina in 1948. He and his wife operated Lake Michumina's weather station and post office. The family relocated to Anchorage in the late 1950s, building a four-acre estate in East Anchorage.

He continued to work for the U.S. federal government in Alaska from 1946 until 1971. His work included positions in the Civil Aeronautics Administration, the Federal Aviation Administration, and the Federal Field Committee for Development Planning in Alaska. During his tenure with the federal government, Parker established air support services to Prudhoe Bay in preparation for the construction of the Dalton Highway and developed air transportation routes throughout Alaska. He also coordinated federal policy to comply with the 1971 Alaska Native Claims Settlement Act. He left the U.S. civil service in 1971.

Parker was elected to the Greater Anchorage Area Borough Assembly in 1971. He served on the Assembly from 1971 until 1974.

He also joined the faculty of the University of Alaska in 1971, where he taught urban planning, political science and regional planning until 1980. He also worked in the fields of transportation and international fisheries while at the University of Alaska.

He and his wife, Patricia, founded Parker Associates during the 1970s, a transportation and telecommunications consulting firm which included NASA's satellite program among its clients.

Parker represented Alaska as an official delegate to the Third United Nations Conference on the Law of the Sea in 1973. In 1974, Alaska Governor William A. Egan appointed Parker to as an environmental consultant to the Alaska State Pipeline Office, where he served as the director of the pipeline's technical staff. He also supervised the construction of the Dalton Highway while working at the pipeline office.

Jay Hammond, the Governor from 1974 to 1982, appointed Walter Parker as the Alaska state highway commissioner with the intent to form a new transportation department. As Highway Commissioner, Parker established the Alaska Department of Transportation & Public Facilities during the Hammond administration. Hammond also appointed him as chairman of the Alaska Telecommunications Task Force, which managed Alaska's transition from microwaves to a satellite-based communication system; chairman of the Alaska Oil Tanker Task Force; and a state delegate to Pacific Oil and Ports Group as a representative for Alaska.

Parker became the chair of the Joint Federal/State Land Use Planning Commission for Alaska in 1976. Under Parker, the Joint Federal/State Land Use Planning Commission provided local information and feedback for the Alaska National Interest Lands Conservation Act, which was signed into law in 1980 by U.S. President Jimmy Carter.

On March 24, 1989, the Exxon Valdez oil tanker struck Bligh Reef in Prince William Sound, spilling an estimated 260,000 to 750,000 barrels of crude oil. The Exxon Valdez oil spill was a major environmental disaster for the state. Governor Steve Cowper, who held office at the time of the spill, appointed Walter Parker as the chairman of the Alaska Oil Spill Commission in 1989. The Alaska Oil Spill Commission was created by the Alaska state government to investigate the causes of the Exxon Valdez oil spill. Under Parker, the Commission issued 52 recommendations to improve national, state and oil industry policies in the wake of the Exxon Valdez disaster. One the recommendations called for a creation of a citizen committee to oversee the oil industry in the Prince William Sound, which led to the formation of the Prince William Sound Regional Citizens’ Advisory Council. The United States Congress adopted 50 of the Committee's 52 recommendations into the Oil Pollution Act of 1990.

Walter Parker next served as the chairman of the Alaska Hazardous Substance Spill Technology Review Council from 1990 to 1995. The council investigated the handling of potential hazard substances, such as oil, within Alaska.

U.S President Bill Clinton appointed Parker as a commissioner of the United States Arctic Research Commission. He served on the Arctic Research Commission from 1995 until 2001.

Following the formation of the Arctic Council in 1996, Parker became a member of the council's Sustainable Development Working Group, as well as a delegate to the Arctic Council's Senior Arctic Officials and the Arctic Environmental Protection Strategy Working Group on Emergency Preparation, Prevention and Response.

Walter Parker also served on the boards of numerous other organizations. These included the Prince William Sound Regional Citizens' Advisory Council, the Anchorage Citizens Coalition, the Institute of the North, the International Bering Sea Forum, the Northern Forum, and the Anchorage Trails and Greenways Coalition.

On May 12, 2000, he and a team completed a 1,300 mile flight and landing at the North Pole in an AN II Russian BI-plane. The Alaska Conservation Foundation inducted him into the Alaska Conservation Hall of Fame in 2002.

In the early 2000s, the University of Alaska launched the "Creating Alaska - The Origins of the 49th State" project to commemorate the 50th anniversaries of both the Alaska Constitutional Convention (1955-1956) and statehood in 1959. Parker was named to the Creating Alaska Project's Advisory board, an honorary group of prominent Alaskan leaders which oversaw the project. Other members of the 21-person board included former territorial and state governors Mike Stepovich and Walter Hickel, former First Lady Neva Egan, and journalist William Tobin.

Walter Parker died at his home in Anchorage, Alaska, on June 25, 2014, at the age of 87 following a short illness with double pneumonia. He was survived by his five children. His wife of 55 years, Patricia Ertman Parker, died on July 17, 2001.
