= Celia M. Hunter =

American conservationist in Alaska (1919–2001)

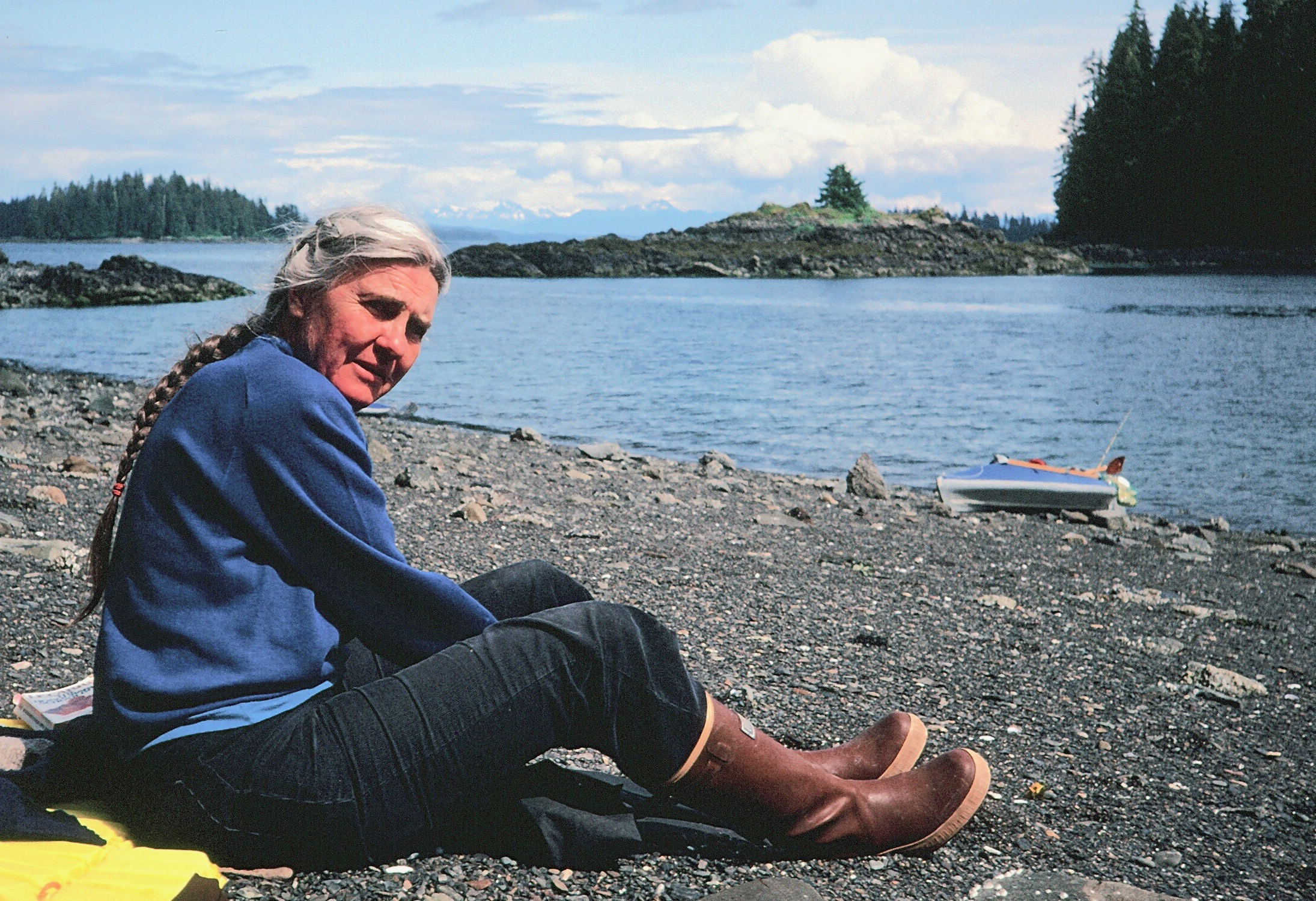
- Celia Hunter on a sea kayaking trip along the east shore of the newly established Admiralty Island National Monument, June 1981.
- Born: January 13, 1919; Arlington, Washington
- Died: December 1, 2001 (aged 82)
- Occupations: Conservationist and advocate for Alaskan wilderness

Celia Hunter (January 13, 1919 – December 1, 2001) was an American conservationist and advocate for wilderness protection in her home state of Alaska. She was conferred the highest award by the Sierra Club, The John Muir Award, in 1991. She was presented the highest award by the Wilderness Society, The Robert Marshall Award, in 1998.

== Early life ==
Celia M. Hunter was born January 13, 1919, in Arlington, Washington and was raised a Quaker on a small farm during the Great Depression. Celia graduated high school in 1936. She sought college education only decades later, earning her Bachelor of Arts in botany in 1964 with a minor in economics and anthropology from the University of Alaska Fairbanks. Instead, following high school, she was employed as a clerk for Weyerhaeuser Timber Company. On her way to work, she drove past Everett Airport. Her first flight lesson was the week following her 21st birthday, and during World War II, she became one of first women to pilot planes needing domestic transport for the military. She did not consider herself a conservationist, remarking: "I don't think 'conservationist' existed in my vocabulary at that time [...] We were just looking for adventures!"

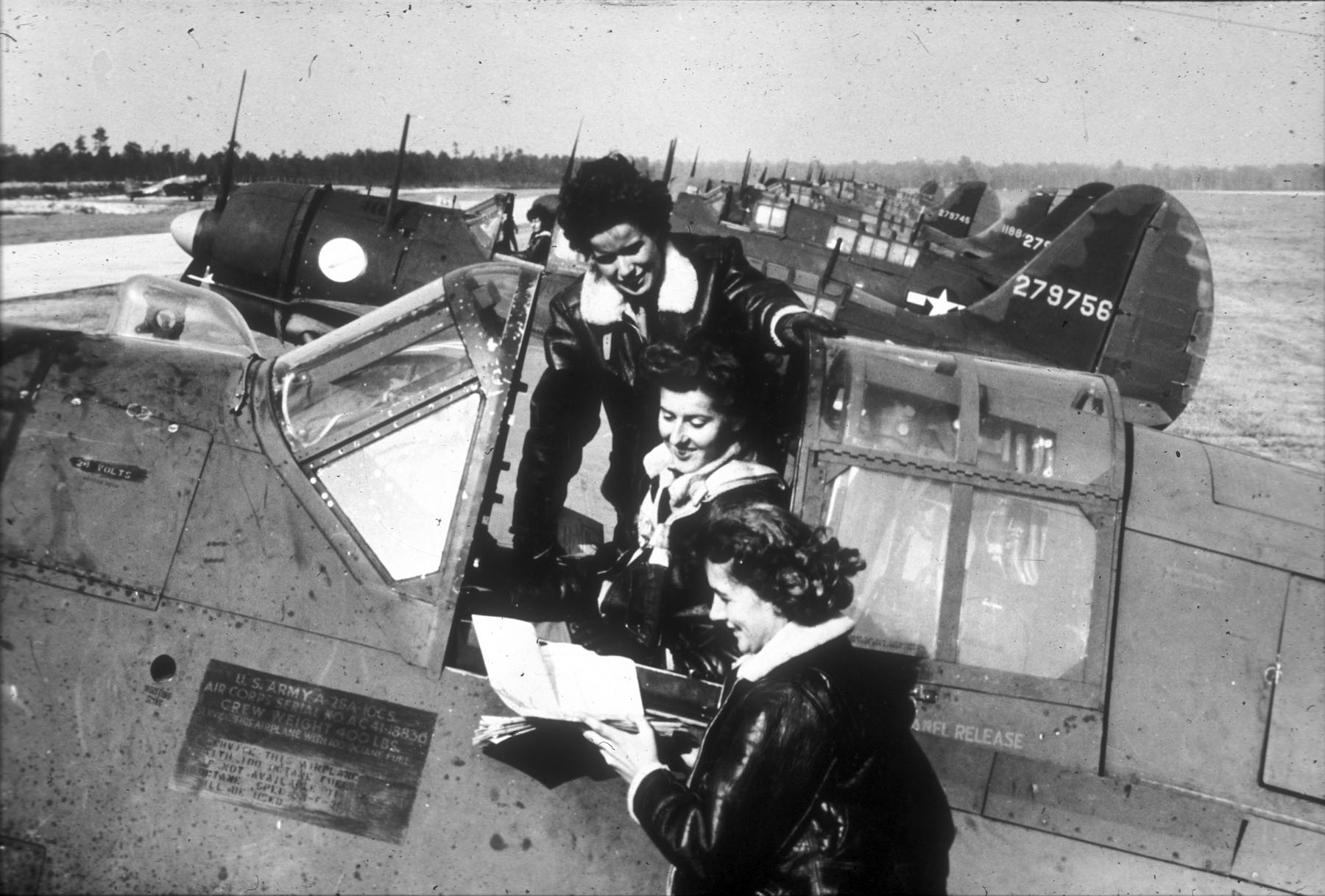
Fellow Women Airforce Service Pilots

== Career ==
=== Military service as a pilot ===
Hunter trained as a pilot and eventually served as a pilot during World War II, becoming a member of the Women Airforce Service Pilots, also known as the WASPs, and graduating with class 43-W5. Hunter flew planes from the factories to training centers and ports of embarkation throughout the USA. She successfully completed each upgrading until she was qualified to fly the most sophisticated fighter planes in the US military.

The US Ferrying Division ruled that women should not be allowed to ferry military fighter planes any farther north than Great Falls, Montana. "We ferried them from factories clear across the US, but 'sorry, gals, turn them over to the men here' and they got to fly them on the Northwest Staging Route through Edmonton, Fort Nelson, Watson Lake, and Whitehorse to Fairbanks," Hunter told students at Linfield College during a 1997 speech.

Two years later, Hunter and fellow WASP Ginny Hill Wood traveled to Fairbanks. They made a deal with an Alaskan pilot, who was in Seattle, to fly two of his planes to Fairbanks. The trip from Seattle to Fairbanks took 27 days. Before leaving for Fairbanks, Hunter and Wood spent a semester at school in Sweden, then spent 10 months bicycling throughout Europe, which was still suffering the devastation inflicted by the war. To get back to the United States, they hitchhiked across the Atlantic Ocean on a tanker. “We bought a jeep station wagon and drove cross-country to Seattle, but found the U.S. too affluent for our tastes [so we] headed back to Alaska,” exclaimed Woods on her journey back to Alaska.

The two women arrived in Fairbanks on January 1, 1947, in the midst of a thick snowstorm. The temperature was almost −50 °F (−46 °C) and the only scheduled airline could not fly in those temperatures. Finding themselves stranded, Hunter and Wood secured jobs in a start-up travel agency. Hunter served as a flight attendant on the first-ever tourist trips to Kotzebue and Nome and planned the first sightseeing tours of Fairbanks. In autumn 1947, Hunter enrolled in the Stockholm University in a special course designed for American GI students. After a semester in Sweden, Hunter and Wood spent ten months bicycling through war-torn Europe and eventually hitchhiked on tankers back to the United States, where they returned to Alaska.

=== Camp Denali ===
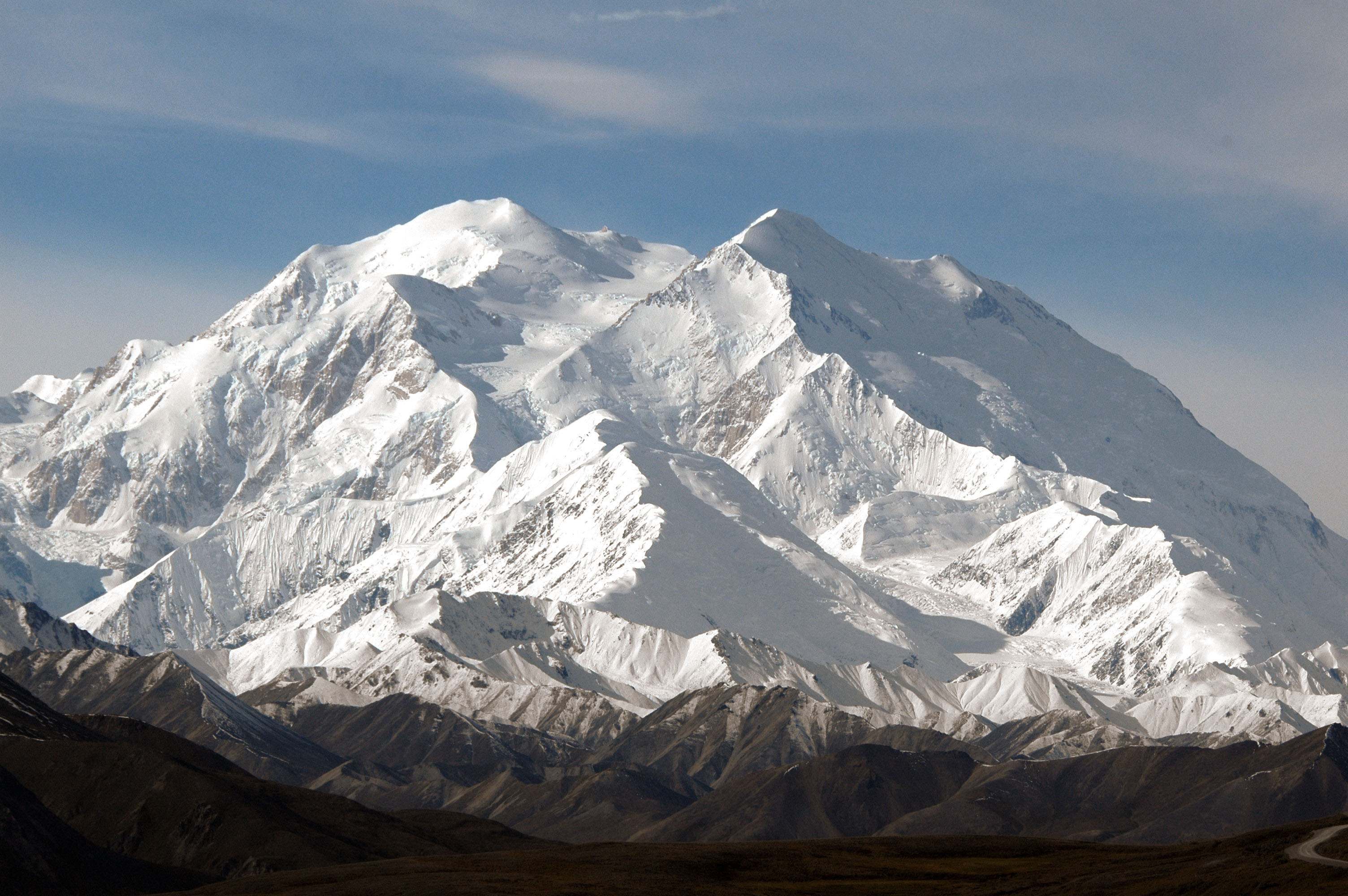
Denali Mountain

Hunter and Wood, together with Wood's husband, decided to start Camp Denali, which was planned to be similar to the hut systems in Europe, with simple accommodations coupled with outdoor activities. The threesome staked out a Trade and Manufacturing Site claim under the Homestead Act along the then-western boundary of Denali National Park, with a view of Denali, and opened in 1952. Their stated management philosophy was "to create a setting in which our guests, staff, and even casual visitors would be aware of the wonders of the natural world that surrounded us." Camp Denali was sold in 1975 and now lies within Denali National Park.

The three found themselves increasingly involved in Alaska's issues. When Hunter and Wood first arrived in Alaska, it was a territory with approximately 180,000 people. "Flying across bush Alaska, the entire landscape was a seamless whole, unmarred by man-made boundaries. Alaskans assumed it would always be like this, and they resisted strenuously the setting aside of particular lands to protect them."

The trip that Olaus and Mardy Murie made in 1956 to the Sheenjek River at Lost and Lobo Lakes in the foothills of the Brooks Range was the catalyst that started the conservation movement in Alaska. Olaus Murie was a naturalist and wildlife biologist well-known for his work in Alaska. After their trip, Murie proposed the creation of the Arctic National Wildlife Refuge to protect an ecosystem large enough to support the great Porcupine River caribou herd and other large populations of wildlife. Hunter met the Muries on one of their trips through Fairbanks. "We really supported very strongly what they were trying to do. Olaus Murie went home and drew lines on the map and we started fighting for setting aside the area," said Hunter.

The group soon realized that setting aside the Range was virtually impossible to do through Congress, because the congressional delegation of Alaska was adamantly opposed to any withdrawals of land for conservation purposes. Hunter and others began fighting for the Refuge unofficially until they decided they would need to form an organization in order to be most effective. The Alaska Conservation Society (ACS), Alaska's first statewide conservation organization, was formed in 1960, providing a venue for Hunter and others to testify on behalf of the Arctic National Wildlife Refuge (ANWR). Support for ANWR came primarily from congressional delegates and other conservationists outside of Alaska. Hunter remarked, "OK, if you don't want to listen to people from Outside, you better listen to us." Despite strong opposition from Alaska's senators and lone congressman, a presidential proclamation by President Dwight D. Eisenhower and Secretary of the Interior Fred Seaton created the Wildlife Refuge shortly before Eisenhower left office in 1960. Following this success, ACS continued to serve as a vehicle through which Alaskans could be heard on conservation issues. Hunter acted as the executive secretary of ACS for the next 12 years.

== Legacy ==
Celia Hunter died on December 1, 2001, at age 82. She spent her last night writing letters to Congressmen in support of protecting the Arctic National Wildlife Refuge from oil drilling. Her life spanned an important part of Alaska's history. Hunter was a cornerstone of the conservation movement in Alaska. Her legacy can be shown through her work with the ACS and ACF.

Hunter's list of accomplishments and her lasting legacy are affirmations that she was an effective leader for over 50 years.

=== Conservation legacy ===
Celia Hunter started the Alaska Conservation Foundation (ACF) in 1980, previously known as the Alaska Conservation Society (ACS), and served on the board of trustees for more than 18 years.

==== Rampart Dam ====
Soon after its formation, ACS found itself opposing two other major battles: Rampart Dam and Project Chariot. Rampart Dam, the first battle was over the proposal to build a dam on the Yukon River at a location known as The Ramparts. The Rampart Dam would have created a lake 300 miles (480 km) long and affected climates and ecosystems clear into the Yukon Territories. As well as submerged numerous small villages, inundated millions of acres of rich waterfowl and wildlife habitat, and displaced large numbers of mammal populations. Celia Hunter, Ginny Wood, and other ACS members worked diligently to expose the shortcomings of the proposal. Rampart Dam would have theoretically produced vast quantities of electrical power and involved the construction of a large aluminum processing complex in Southcentral Alaska to take advantage of the cheap power. Debates took place in Fairbanks and were largely attended by the public. Woods recalls Hunter talking about the economics of the project and not just about saving moose and ducks. By doing her homework, Hunter was successful in exposing common sense complications and problems with the proposal.

==== Project Chariot ====
The second battle was known as Project Chariot, a proposal that involved shoreline blasting using a nuclear bomb to blast a harbor out of the northwest Arctic coast 30 miles (48 km) south of Pt. Hope. Dr. Edward Teller and others from the Atomic Energy Commission (AEC) had come to Alaska to convince residents that atomic power in the Arctic would bring a wealth of benefits to the state. He toured the state and convinced the Alaskan delegation and the Anchorage and Fairbanks Chambers of Commerce of the economic benefits that would result from a permanently open port at Point Hope. Academics at the University of Alaska-Fairbanks were not so easily convinced. The University's professors demanded to know how Dr. Teller and the AEC would identify the impacts of fallout from a nuclear explosion with no pre-blast knowledge of the land and its inhabitants. That was how they got the first Environmental Impact Statement investigation.

==== Organizations ====
The Alaska Conservation Society (ACS) took on many other battles utilizing both reactive and proactive strategies to protect Alaska's environment. ACS chapters worked on their own issues and communicated through the News Bulletin. The organization dissolved after 20 years. They divided the remaining money between the Alaska Center for the Environment (ACE), Southeast Alaska Conservation Council (SEACC), and The Northern Alaska Environment Council (NAEC).

In 1969 Hunter was offered a position on the Governing Council of the Wilderness Society. In 1972, Hunter was nominated by Secretary of the Interior Rogers C.B. Morton to sit on the Joint Federal-State Land Use Planning Commission where she articulated the environmentalists' viewpoint. The Alaska National Interest Lands Conservation Act was signed into law in 1980. Leading up to Congressional deliberation, The Wilderness Society advanced Hunter to the executive director position in 1976, requiring her to temporarily move from Fairbanks, Alaska to Washington, D.C. She thereby became "the first woman to head a national environmental organization."

=== Mentorship ===
In the mid and late 1970s, while serving on the Joint Federal-State Land Use Planning Commission for Alaska (headquartered in Anchorage), Hunter mentored young women arriving in Alaska from the southern states in search of both adventure and participation in one of America's landmark conservation episodes: the apportionment of then-undesignated federal lands into forms with protected status (national parks and national monuments) versus unprotected status (United States Forest Service and Bureau of Land Management), culminating in Congressional passage in 1980 of the Alaska National Interest Lands Conservation Act.

A former Camp Denali employee who later became the wilderness coordinator for the Alaska region of the U.S. Fish & Wildlife Service wrote in a 2020 governmental report on women in conservation that Hunter's leadership style embodied light-hearted humor, grace, humility and the ability to listen. Hunter's lingering effect as a mentor was demonstrated when Terry Tempest Williams, another next-generation wilderness advocate, invoked Hunter's ideals in a 2012 essay urgently opposing federal opening of the Arctic shelf for exploratory oil drilling.
