= Riki Ott =

American marine toxicologist and activist

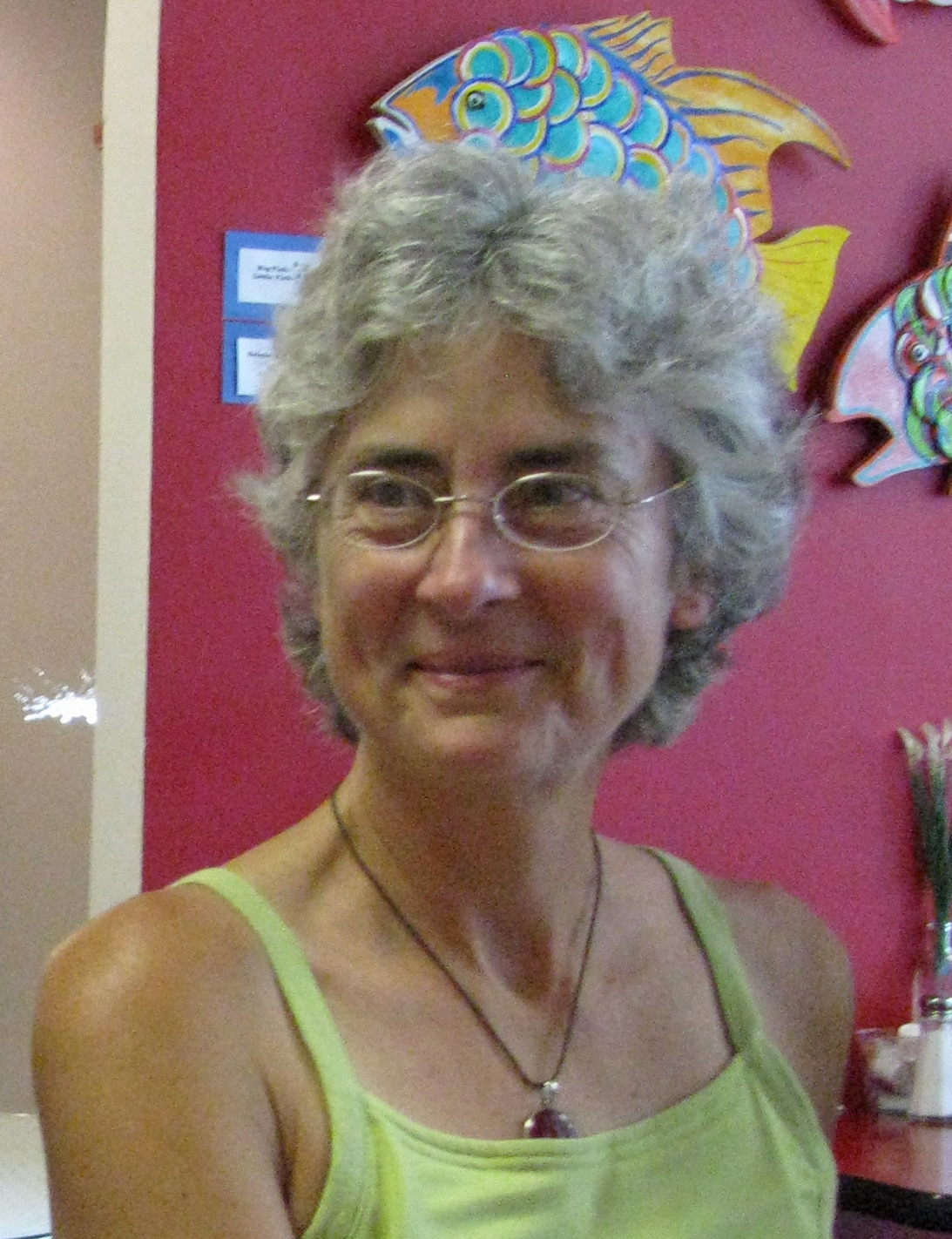
- Ott in Jackson, Mississippi after the BP Deepwater Horizon oil spill.
- Born: August 8, 1954 (age 72)
- Education: University of Washington
- Occupation: marine toxicologist
- Writing career
- Genre: non-fiction

Riki Ott (born August 8, 1954) is an American marine toxicologist and activist in Cordova, Alaska. Ott was frequently introduced as an "oil spill expert" in her many media appearances during the height of the 2010 BP Deepwater Horizon oil spill news coverage. After graduating with a doctorate in sedimentary toxicology from the University of Washington, Ott moved to Alaska and started a fishing business. When the Exxon Valdez oil spill disrupted the local fishing-based economy, she became an environmental activist. Since the spill, she has participated in legal and public relations disputes with the Exxon company.

Ott has more recently become involved in the movement to end corporate personhood through a constitutional amendment. She has also repeatedly visited the Gulf of Mexico in the wake of the spill, which, she argues, is causing health consequences similar to the 1989 Exxon spill.

== Background ==
Ott grew up in Wisconsin. She was inspired by Rachel Carson's Silent Spring and decided to pursue an education in marine biology near the ocean. She earned a BA with a major in Geology-Biology at Colby College in 1976; an MSc (with special focus on how oil affects zooplankton) from the University of South Carolina in 1980 and a PhD in sediment toxicology from the University of Washington in 1985. After completing her academic education she started a commercial fishing business in Prince William Sound.

== Exxon Valdez oil spill ==
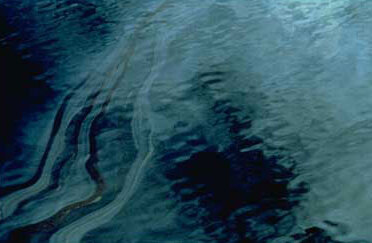
Ott flew over the Exxon Valdez oil spill the day after the crash

Ott was working in Cordova, Alaska in 1989 when the Exxon Valdez was grounded onto the nearby Bligh Reef. The subsequent oil spill (then the largest in U.S. history) had major ramifications for the local ecosystem and for Cordova. Ott participated in the legal response to Exxon and became an activist and organizer. As a marine biologist and participant in the fishing industry, Ott quickly became a key spokesperson for those affected by the spill. She helped to draft parts of the Oil Pollution Act of 1990, which authorized the creation of the Prince William Sound Regional Citizens’ Advisory Council and called for the introduction of double-hull oil tankers.

Ott continued to live and work in the 2500-person town of Cordova, which suffered economic and social collapse in the wake of the oil spill. She says that Cordova was also impacted by a "money spill" from Exxon, which divided the community by paying certain people to clean up the spill while excluding others.

Ott has written two books on the Exxon Valdez spill and its consequences, entitled Sound Truth and Corporate Myth$: The Legacy of the Exxon Valdez Oil Spill and Not One Drop: Betrayal and Courage in the Wake of the Exxon Valdez Oil Spill published in 2005 and 2008 respectively.

Ott is featured in the 2009 film Black Wave, which discusses the history of Cordova's legal battle with Exxon.

Tom Cirigliano, Media Relations Manager for Exxon, has argued that Ott overestimates the amount of oil spilled and underestimates the company's response to the event.

== BP Deepwater Horizon oil spill ==
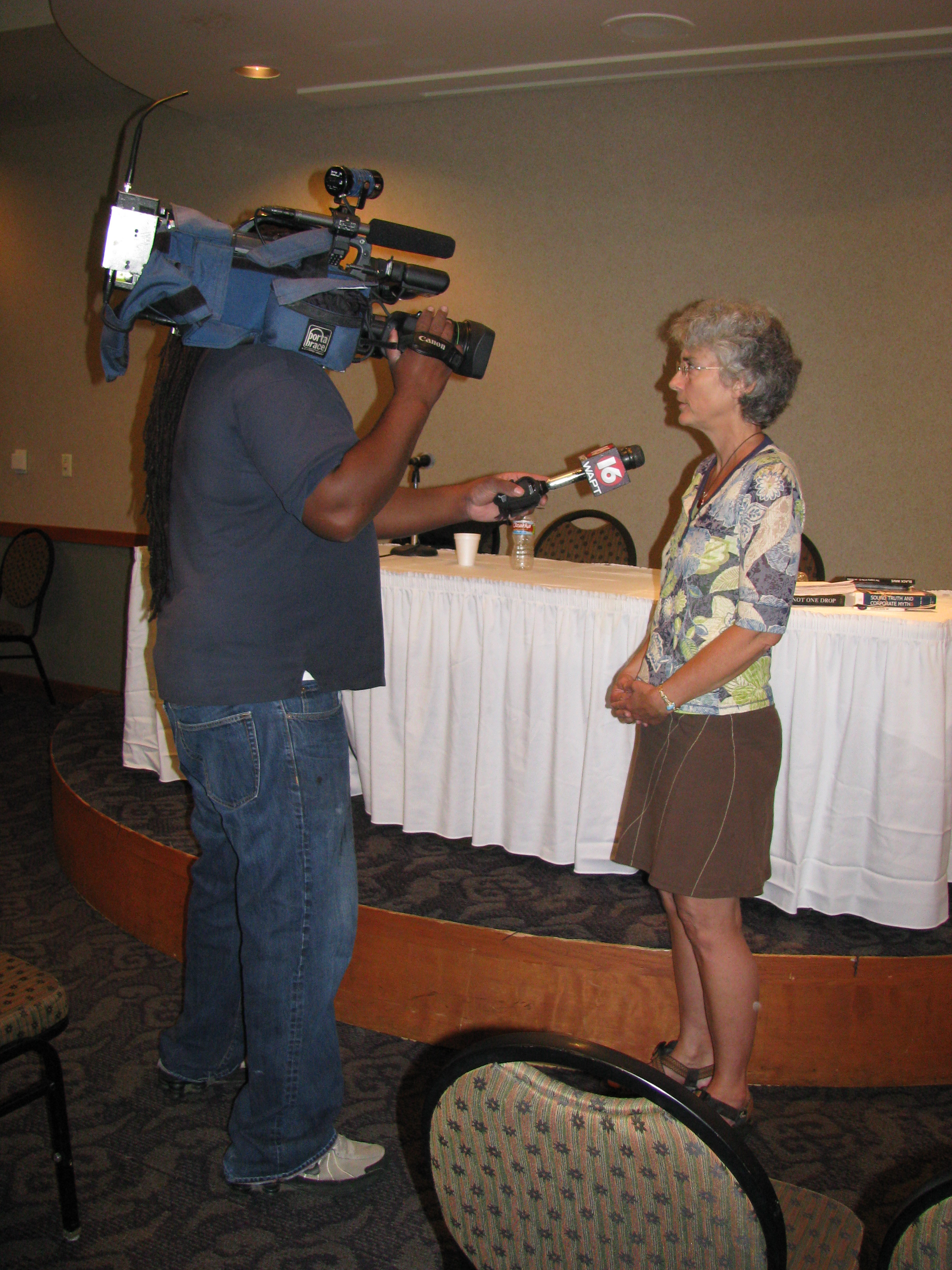
Radio interview in Mississippi

When the 2010 BP Deepwater Horizon oil spill eclipsed the loss of the Exxon Valdez as America's largest disaster of this kind, Ott travelled to the Gulf of Mexico to assess the damage from the spill and to speak with affected communities. She said that people were experiencing severe medical conditions and dying as a result of oil in their blood. In an interview with Rose Aguilar, she expressed concern about the health issues in the Gulf following the spill, detailing some who had evacuated and criticizing public officials for their response. She cautioned workers involved in cleaning up the mess to be wary of the health effects of going near the oil slick, saying that those who had been affected by the spill from the Exxon Valdez had suffered long-term consequences of a medical nature. She also cautioned workers to guard against the perils of another 'money spill'.

Ott criticized BP for using Corexit to disperse the oil, which she alleges is toxic to humans. In August 2010 she wrote an open letter to the Environmental Protection Agency alleging that dispersants were still being used in secret and demanding that the EPA take action. The letter was published in the Huffington Post.

== Corporate personhood ==
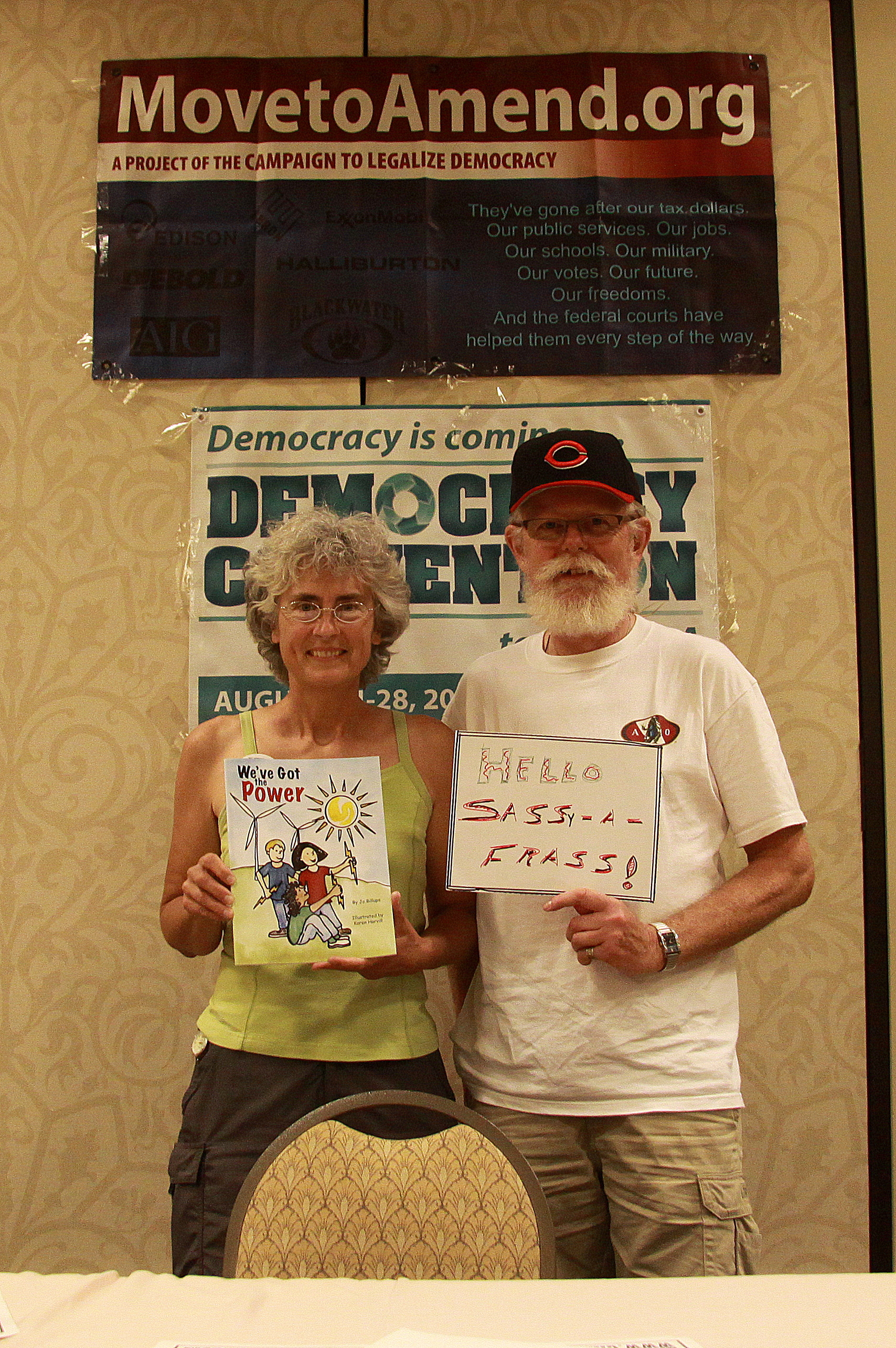
Ott promoting a Constitutional Amendment to end corporate personhood

Ott opposes the legal doctrine of corporate personhood (which she traces back to 1886) and supports amending the U.S. Constitution to clarify that corporations do not possess human rights. She argues that corporations use personhood to seek extraordinary privileges. She cites, for example, Exxon's attempt to re-enter Prince William Sound—after being banned from the area by the Oil Pollution Act of 1990—by claiming a Fifth Amendment right.

An "epiphany" about corporate personhood came to Ott during the struggle against Exxon, during which she sought to answer the question: "How did corporations get so big that they can manipulate the legal system?'”

== Books by Ott ==
- Alaska's Copper River Delta. University of Washington Press: 1998. ISBN 9780295977430.
- Sound Truth and Corporate Myth$: The Legacy of the Exxon Valdez Oil Spill. Dragonfly Sisters Press: 2005. ISBN 0964522667. Republished in 2007 by Chelsea Green, ISBN 9780964522664
- Not One Drop: Betrayal and Courage in the Wake of the Exxon Valdez Oil Spill. Chelsea Green: 2008. ISBN 9781933392585.
