= List of National Natural Landmarks in Oklahoma =

There are 3 National Natural Landmarks in Oklahoma.

Oklahoma National Natural Landmarks (clickable map)

Name	Image	Date	Location	County	Ownership	Description
Devil's Canyon		December 1974	35.363333°N 98.341667°W	Canadian	private	Known for several different mesic plants in a diverse environment of oak woodland/tall prairie grass and eastern deciduous forest
McCurtain County Wilderness Area		December 1974	Broken Bow 34.281971°N 94.696655°W	McCurtain	state	A 14,087 acres (57.01 km^{2}) wilderness nature preserve since 1918. It is an excellent example of a xeric upland oak-pine forest
Salt Plains National Wildlife Refuge		June 1983	Jet 36.750314°N 98.224259°W	Alfalfa	federal	A 32,000-acre (130 km^{2}) National Wildlife Refuge, it is a critical habitat for 75% of the endangered whooping crane population.

== See also ==
- List of National Historic Landmarks in Oklahoma
