= The Ramparts =

The Ramparts may refer to:

- Rampart Canyon (Alaska), rapids on the Yukon River, in Alaska
- The Ramparts (Mackenzie River), 12 km of rapids, on the Mackenzie River
- The Ramparts (Canada), a mountain range
