= Ginny Wood =

American environmentalist

- Born: Virginia Hill; October 24, 1917; Moro, Oregon, USA
- Died: March 8, 2013 (aged 95); Fairbanks, Alaska, USA
- Education: Washington State College
- Occupations: Environmentalist, pilot
- Known for: Environmental activism Environmental conservation Co-founder of Alaska Conservation Society
- Spouse: Martin Wood (m. 1950, divorced)

Virginia Hill Wood (October 24, 1917 – March 8, 2013) was an American environmental activist and a pioneer in the Alaskan conservation movement. Ginny Wood co-founded the Alaska Conservation Society in 1960 with her then husband, Morton "Woody" Wood.

== Biography ==
=== Early life and family ===
Virginia Hill Wood was born in Moro, Oregon, to Charles Edwin Hill, an experimental farm superintendent, and Edythe née Brunquist Hill, a schoolteacher, on October 24, 1917. Her father was from a wealthy family from Springfield, Massachusetts, supposedly a distant relation to James Garfield, while her mother grew up in Boston as the daughter of Swedish immigrants. Wood's uncle, Ernest Brunquist was a noted psychologist and botanist, who served as an honorary curator at the Denver Museum of Natural History. Her parents met while attending Oregon State University, and had one other daughter, Marjorie, after Wood. Shortly after Wood's birth, the family moved to Waterville, Washington.

Wood became fond of outdoor activities such as hiking, fishing, river rafting and horseback riding during her childhood, and her family spent many summers at a cottage on Lake Chelan. As a teenager, she worked as a camp counselor and ranch tour guide.

After graduating from high school, Wood enrolled at Washington State College at Pullman (now Washington State University), but left in 1938, after one year, to travel in Europe. Afterwards, she spent the summer of 1939 working for Campfire Girls in upstate New York, before resuming her studies in Washington.

=== Aviation ===
Her first flight was at age 4, seated in her father's lap with a barnstorming pilot at the controls. While a senior at the University of Washington, she enrolled in the Civilian Pilot Training Service, passing the competitive entrance examinations to become one of five women in the program. After completing the program, Wood attempted to obtain her commercial flight license, but struggled to reach the required hours of flying time after the attack on Pearl Harbor restricted civilian flying. She continued studying English at the University of Washington and worked as a ski patrolman and truck driver on the side before her friend, Barbara Erickson, convinced her to join the Women Airforce Service Pilots (WASP) corps for flight instruction in 1943. Wood trained for five months in Sweetwater, Texas under Jacqueline Cochran and Nancy Love, before being assigned the Sixth Ferrying Division in Long Beach, California.

The WASP corps was disbanded in December 1944, shortly before the end of World War II, and the female pilots were awarded military status for their service retroactively in 1977.

After the war she flew cargo flights and war-surplus planes to Alaska and piloted tourist flights from Fairbanks to Kotzebue, Alaska with Wien Airlines. She also returned to Europe for a second bicycle tour in 1948 with Celia M. Hunter, a fellow WASP pilot. In the early 1950s, Wood and her husband purchased a used Cessna 170, and took tourists on aerial trips around Fairbanks.

=== Environmentalist ===
While skiing in Fairbanks after the war, she met Morton Wood, a forest ranger at Mount McKinley National Park (now Denali National Park) and Katmai National Park. They married in 1950.

In 1951, the Woods and Hunter pooled their resources to buy land in the Alaskan wilderness under the Homestead Act. In 1952, they began building Camp Denali on the property, located around Wonder Lake, to serve as a tourist outpost and a base for backcountry exploration. Because Camp Denali had one of the few airplanes in the national park, Wood was frequently called in to do search and rescue operations, and to help trips taken by the United States Geological Survey. The camp sold the airplane in 1964, as the 1957 construction of the Denali Highway had greatly improved road accessibility to and from the camp.

Wood was influenced by the writings of pioneer ecologist Aldo Leopold and his philosophy that the natural world and plants had intrinsic rights.

In the late 1950s, Wood hosted a meeting in her living room that led to formation of the Alaska Conservation Society. Wood helped lead protests against Project Chariot, a plan to use nuclear explosives to create a deep-water harbor in northwest Alaska and she testified before Congress in opposition to the Rampart Dam. In 1960 she lobbied U.S. President Dwight D. Eisenhower to designate the Arctic National Wildlife Refuge.

Wood wrote a regular column for the Northern Alaska Environmental Center's newsletter. She guided her last back-country trip at age 70 and continued to cross-country ski into her 80s.

She died in her home in Fairbanks, Alaska, of natural causes.

== Awards ==
- 1985: Celia Hunter Award, Alaska Conservation Foundation
- 1991: John Muir Award, Sierra Club
- 1993: Ginny Hill Wood Award, Alaska Wilderness Recreation and Tourism Association
- 2001: Alaska Conservationist Lifetime Achievement Award, Alaska Conservation Foundation
- 2009: Florence Collins Award, Northern Alaska Environmental Center
- 2010: Citizens Award for Exceptional Service, United States Fish and Wildlife Service
