= Sierra Club John Muir Award =

- Description: Highest honor for leadership in national conservation
- Country: United States
- Presented by: Sierra Club

The Sierra Club John Muir Award was awarded annually by the Sierra Club. It was the club's highest award. According to the Sierra Club, "it honors a distinguished record of leadership in national conservation causes, such as continuing John Muir's work of preservation and establishment of parks and wildernesses."

Due to the Sierra Club's re-evaluation's of John Muir legacy in the context of racial justice, the John Muir Award was discontinued in 2020, after which the club's highest award was named the Changemaker of the Year Award starting in 2021.

== Recipients of the John Muir Award ==
Source: Sierra Club awards page

- 1961 William Edward Colby
- 1962 Olaus Murie
- 1963 Ansel Adams
- 1964 Walter A. Starr
- 1965 Francis P. Farquhar
- 1966 Harold C. Bradley
- 1967 Sigurd F. Olson
- 1969 Henry M. Jackson
- 1970 George Marshall
- 1971 John P. Saylor
- 1972 Edgar Wayburn
- 1973 Richard M. Leonard
- 1974 John B. Oakes
- 1975 William O. Douglas
- 1976 Jacques Cousteau
- 1977 David R. Brower
- 1978 Phillip Berry
- 1979 J. Michael McCloskey
- 1980 Paul Ehrlich
- 1981 Brock Evans
- 1982 Wallace Stegner
- 1983 Margaret E. Murie
- 1984 Brant Calkin
- 1985 Denis A. Hayes
- 1986 Horace M. Albright
- 1987 John A. McComb
- 1988 John Seiberling
- 1989 Paul Brooks
- 1991 Celia Hunter, Ginny Wood
- 1992 James C. Catlin
- 1993 Martin Litton
- 1994 William E. Siri
- 1995 Joseph B. Fontaine
- 1996 Elden Hughes
- 1997 Doug Scott
- 1998 Jim Dodson
- 1999 Judy Anderson
- 2000 Carla Cloer
- 2001 Gaylord Nelson
- 2002 Jim Jeffords
- 2003 Vivian Newman
- 2004 Vicky Hoover
- 2005 Howard Booth
- 2006 Larry Melhalf
- 2007 Al Gore
- 2008 James E. Hansen
- 2009 Greg Haegele
- 2010 Dick Fiddler
- 2011 Bill McKibben
- 2012 Donald Parks
- 2013 Robert D. Bullard
- 2014 Terry Tempest Williams
- 2015 No award
- 2016 Tom Goldtooth
- 2017 Jane Goodall
- 2018 Yvon Chouinard
- 2019 Nadia Nazar, Varshini Prakash, Kelsey Juliana, Hernaliz Vazquez Torres, Joseph White Eyes

== Recipients of the Changemaker of the Year Award ==
- 2021 Bernadette Demientieff
- 2022 Winona LaDuke
- 2023 Justin J. Pearson
- 2024 Bruce Hamilton

== See also ==
- List of environmental awards
- Prizes named after people
