= Devil's Canyon Bridge =

- U.S. National Register of Historic Places
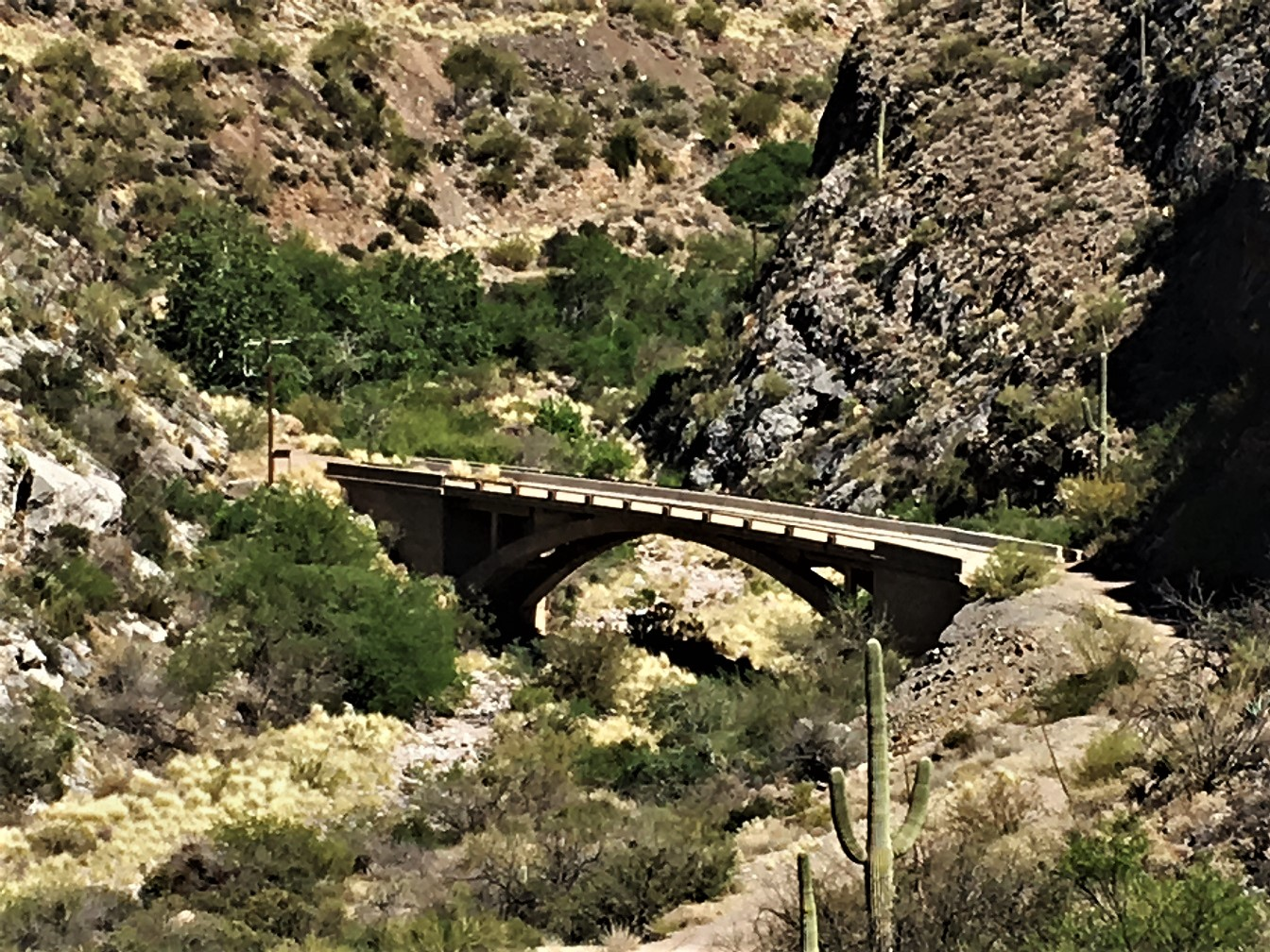
- View of bridge from afar, in 2018

- Location within Arizona
- Nearest city: Superior, Arizona
- Coordinates: 33.32791°N 111.03209°W
- Area: 0.1 acres (0.040 ha)
- Built: 1921–22
- Built by: H.B. Wright
- Architect: Arizona Highway Dept.
- Architectural style: Filled spandrel arch
- MPS: Vehicular Bridges in Arizona MPS
- NRHP reference No.: 88001681
- Added to NRHP: September 30, 1988

The Devil's Canyon Bridge (located in Pinal County, Arizona) was built in 1921 and listed on the National Register of Historic Places in 1988. It is an historic abandoned section of U.S. Route 60 over Devil's Canyon.

Described as a medium-span, filled-spandrel arch, with a moderate arch barrel rise, a roadway which cantilevered over the arches on both sides, a corbeled arch ring and paneled concrete parapets with steel pipe guardrails. Under the supervision of AHD Resident Engineer H.B. Wright, a force account labor crew constructed the Devil's Canyon Bridge in 1921–22 for a total cost of $23,780. It carried traffic until its replacement in 1941. The Devil's Canyon Bridge now stands abandoned beside U.S. 60. The Devil's Canyon Bridge is historically significant as an integral part [of] one of the state's most important early highway projects. Additionally, this structure is technologically important as an early example of a statewide bridge design trend.

The Arizona Highway Department used three basic concrete arch configurations In the 1910s and 1920s: the Luten arch, the open spandrel arch, and what it termed the "common arch" – or segmental filled spandrel – design. Longspan examples of the former were engineered by their inventor, Daniel Luten, or his assistants. The latter two were designed in-house by AHD bridge engineers for medium-to-long-span applications. The Devil's Canyon Bridge is noteworthy as the oldest such AHD-designed common arch remaining in Arizona. It was followed soon by other similar AHD spans, among them the Lynx Creek Bridge (1922), Verde River Bridge (1922–23) and Fossil Creek Bridge (1924), all featuring similar Luten-like reinforcing, span lengths and concrete detailing."
