= Rampart Search and Rescue =

Rampart Search and Rescue (RSAR) serves the communities within Adams County, Colorado. Its name is derived from the '70's TV show Emergency! where Rampart was the name of the hospital. Rampart search and rescue has been in operation since 1973. The mission of Rampart Search & Rescue is to provide search and rescue assistance, free of charge, to local, county, state and federal agencies during missing person searches, both man-made and natural disaster related emergencies.

== Role in the community ==
Rampart Search and Rescue, Inc. has been organized for the purpose of providing traditional search and rescue resources along with urban search and rescue (USAR) for the county. Rampart search and rescue works under the supervision of the Adam's County Sheriff's Department in Colorado. They have 40 adult members and 12 cadets. Their work does not confine them to just Colorado, they have responded to disasters like Hurricane Katrina. Adams County Sheriff's Office relies on RSAR to provide emergency services with the county. They also are responsible for searching for stranded motorist along I-70 when close east of Denver to the Kansas state line. Rampart Search and Rescue serves Adams, Morgan and Lincoln Counties in Colorado. The team spent over a week working in Boulder County during the flood of Sept 10-18 2013. They rescued several from their homes before the flood waters washed their house down stream. The summer of 2013 Morgan County, Colorado added Rampart as the county's search and rescue ground team. Then in the fall of 2014 Lincoln County, Colorado became the third county served by the Rampart search and rescue agency.

The team also supports local fire departments and law enforcement agencies by providing: Traffic management, scene security, perimeter control, evidence search and other non-hazardous services.

The team trains for extensively in many areas of: Land search, severe weather, road closures, emergency care, tornado spotter, Colorado Life Track, missing person, walk-a-ways like Alzheimer's, etc.

== Search Dogs ==
Rampart Search and Rescue (K-9) search dogs respond to search and rescue (SAR) incidents. That are training search dogs year round (weekly) to respond on calls related to missing and/or lost people in the county's urban, suburban and mutual aid "mountain" country. Their training covers; trailing, tracking, air scenting and cadaver recovery searches. They currently have seven bloodhounds, that's more than most search and rescue teams in the United States.

== Cadet Program ==
Their Cadets train alongside the adult members in all aspects of search and rescue and public safety. The Cadets (10 to 20 years old) are trained people to assist local law enforcement in the conduct of search and rescue operations in wilderness and urban settings, and provide valuable community service during disasters and support community events such as parades and celebrations. They also help the Adams County in their Citizens Police Academy as victims in field training. The 12 or so young men and women participating in the program experience a strict disciplined approach to becoming mature young adults. They learn about the importance of education, teamwork, leadership, and community service. Since its conception in 2002, the Rampart Cadet program had successfully graduated over 60 young men and women. The Cadet program keeps kids off the streets, encourages youth in the community to look at Public Safety officers as role models, and instills in them discipline and purpose in life. Several have joined the ranks of Public Safety in Law Enforcement and as Firefighters.

== Community Safety Talks ==
Rampart search and rescue also provides public training and community safety talks free of charge.

As to their funding - there are absolutely no Federal, State, County or City funds provided for this worthwhile search & rescue team, and their community programs – all funds are raised by the participants and other community fund raising events.
