= Rampart Canyon (Alaska) =

Canyon of the Yukon River in Alaska, US

Coordinates: 65.35°N 151°W

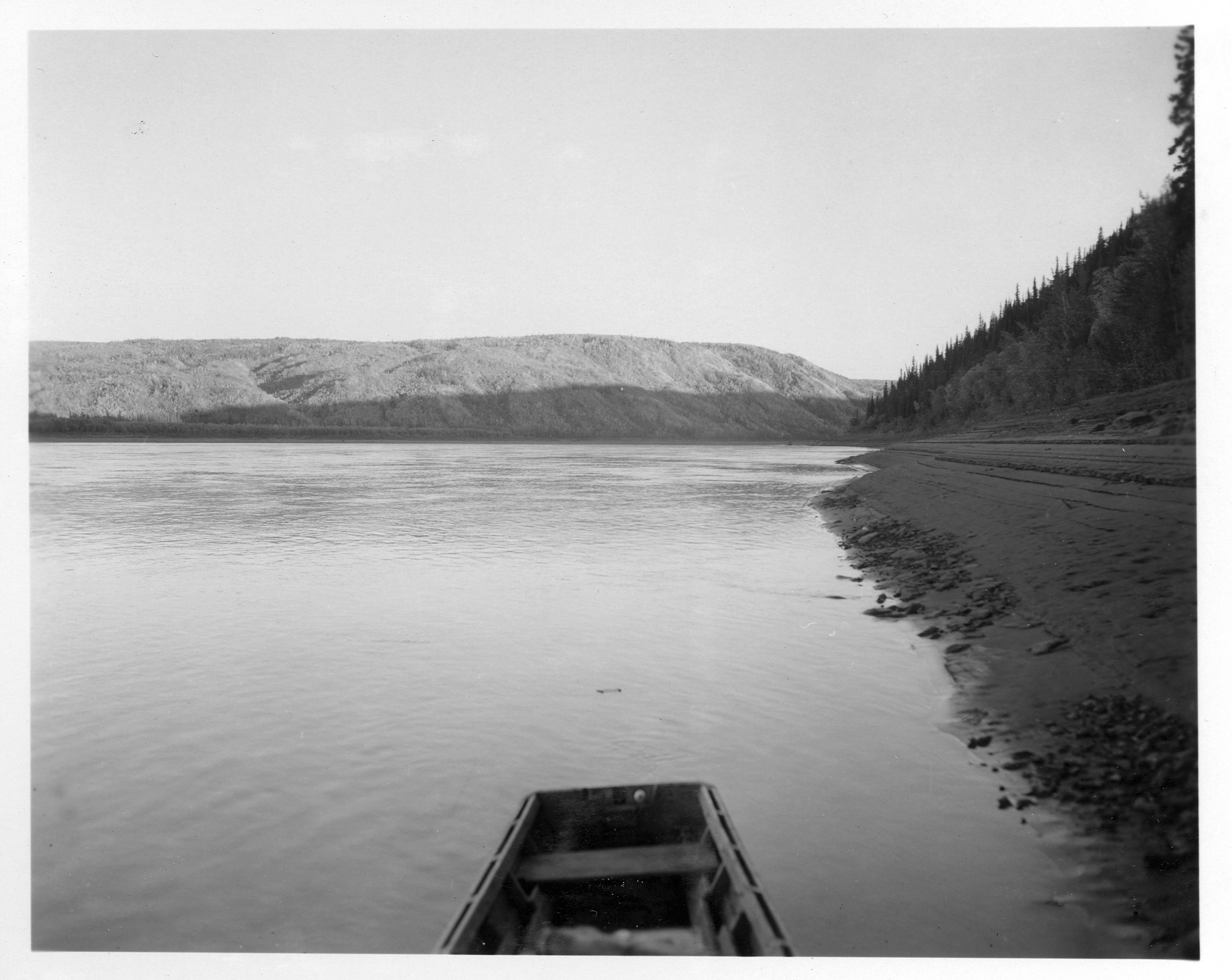
The northern portion of Rampart Canyon is seen in 1949.

Rampart Canyon, Rampart Gorge, Lower Ramparts, and The Ramparts all are names for a high-banked canyon of the Yukon River located downstream of Rampart, Alaska and upstream of Tanana, Alaska. The canyon is located at an elevation of 226 feet (69 m) and was the considered site of a hydroelectric dam.
