= Susitna Hydroelectric Project =

Susitna Dam (Devil's Canyon Dam)
- Location of the Susitna hydroelectric project in Alaska
- Location: Alaska, United States
- Coordinates: 62°49′22″N 148°32′55″W
- Status: Scrapped

Dam and spillways
- Type of dam: Concrete arch
- Impounds: Susitna River
- Height: 735 ft (224 m)

Reservoir
- Total capacity: 4,500,000 acre⋅ft (5.6 km^{3})
- Surface area: 26,880 acres (10,880 ha)

Power Station
- Hydraulic head: 550 ft (170 m)
- Installed capacity: 600 MW
- Annual generation: 2800 GWh (projected)

== Project Overview ==
The Susitna Hydroelectric Project (commonly called the Susitna Dam or the Susitna-Watana Dam) was a proposed hydroelectric power project along the Susitna River in southern Alaska. The project, which originally consisted of two dams along the river, was proposed as early as the 1960s by the U.S. Bureau of Reclamation to supply electricity to the railbelt region of Alaska (areas served by the Alaska Railroad), including the cities of Anchorage and Fairbanks. At the time, it was known as the Devil's Canyon Dam, for its location just upstream of Devils Canyon, a 1,000-foot (300 m)-deep gorge and whitewater rapids formed by the Susitna River. When oil prices and state revenue (based on taxes levied on oil extraction) declined, the plan was put on hold. When oil prices rose to then-record highs in 2008, the rising price of electricity in Alaska caused a revival of interest in the proposal.

The Susitna Hydroelectric project, to be built by the Alaska Energy Authority, was projected to cost $5.2 billion. A 735-foot (224 m) dam would be built on the Susitna River about 120 miles (190 km) north of Anchorage, forming a 42-square-mile (110 km^{2}) reservoir. The dam would consistently produce between 280 and 300 megawatts of power, or about 2,800 GWh per year. The dam would be designed to accommodate a future height increase to 880 feet (270 m). Electricity from the dam would supply about two-thirds of Alaska's population. The alternative is use of natural gas as fuel for generators. Whether to build a natural gas pipeline is also at issue.

== Ecological Impact ==
The Susitna river, which drains into the Cook Inlet, is a major salmon spawning ground. The site of the proposed dam is upstream of the spawning grounds of salmon, but if the dam is constructed the pattern of flow in the river will change due to operation of the dam, thus impacting spawning grounds down stream.

On June 29, 2016, Alaska's governor Bill Walker vetoed the construction of the dam. The reasons were both environmental and economic.
