= Prince William Sound Regional Citizens' Advisory Council =

Regional Citizens Advisory Counsel
- Type: Nonprofit
- Tax ID no.: 92-0133631
- Legal status: 501(c)(3)
- Headquarters: Anchorage, Alaska
- Board President: Robert Archibald
- Executive Director: Donna Schantz
- Website: https://www.pwsrcac.org/

The Prince William Sound Regional Citizens' Advisory Council is an independent non-profit organization based in Anchorage and Valdez, Alaska, whose mission is to promote the environmentally-safe operation of the Alyeska Pipeline's Valdez Marine Terminal and associated oil tankers, and to inform the public of those activities.

== Background and formation ==
In the years leading up to the Exxon Valdez disaster, safeguards against a spill were gradually decreased and emergency responses not adequately prepared. Nor was there any mechanism, other than public hearings by regulatory agencies, for citizens to advise the oil industry or otherwise speak directly on operations affecting their communities and livelihoods. Earlier attempts by Prince William Sound residents to give input to oil industry representatives were generally met with negative responses.

The Council was formed after the Exxon Valdez oil spill of 1989 by citizens of the region to provide a voice for communities affected by oil industry decisions in Prince William Sound, the Gulf of Alaska, and Cook Inlet. As part of a 1990 contract with the Alyeska Pipeline Service Company, the Council receives funding but remains absolutely independent from Alyeska as long as oil flows through the trans-Alaska pipeline. Under the terms of its contract with Alyeska, the Council reviews, monitors, and comments on various aspects of the company's operations, namely: oil spill prevention and response plans, environmental protection capabilities, and actual and potential environmental impacts of terminal and tanker operations.

== Mandate ==
The Council is mandated by the Oil Pollution Act of 1990 (OPA 90) which was passed after the Exxon Valdez spill to address oil spill prevention, response, and liability and compensation should spills occur. As part of a requirement of OPA 90 that Alyeska Pipeline Service Co. was to fund a citizens' advisory group, the Council receives about $2.8 million in funding per year. OPA 90 also ordered the phasing out of single-hull oil tankers, and that loaded single-hull tankers be escorted by at least two towing vessels as they travel through Prince William Sound.

The PWSRCAC currently has nineteen board members and fifteen staff members.

A similar citizen's council, the Cook Inlet Regional Citizens' Advisory Council, was also created following the Exxon Valdez spill for the Cook Inlet region.

== Activities and activism ==
In the decades since the spill and the formation of the PWSRCAC, there has been an evolution in vigilance and spill prevention in Prince William Sound. Though not solely responsible for introducing changes in legislation, by building coalitions of support among other organizations the Council helped promote new policy changes in state and federal legislation related to safeguards against oil spills such as regulating the escorting of tankers through Prince William Sound. The Council has been appointed to a federal committee helping draft regulations for oil tanker preparedness and safety. It has coordinated training programs for different fire teams (municipal and industrial) to respond in the event of a fire on a tanker and at the Valdez Marine Terminal and involved local fisherman in the event of an oil spill response scenario.

It promoted an ice detection radar project, which began in 2002 from Reef Island, monitoring ice flowing from Columbia Glacier (Alaska) into Prince William Sound tanker traffic lanes, and allowed for the ability to track ship movements in real time. The Council also initiated installing weather-reporting equipment in the Sound for ships leaving the area.

The Council has been involved with environmental studies related to the finding of invasive species related to oil tanker traffic in the Sound and the impact of the oil spills on local ecosystems. The Council has also campaigned for controlling vapor emissions from the Valdez Marine Terminal and for limiting the use of chemical dispersants in oil spill cleanups.

When BP's Deepwater Horizon oil drilling rig exploded on April 20, 2010 and began to leak oil into the Gulf of Mexico, the PWSRCAC was kept very busy responding to calls for assistance and information. Following this spill President Barack Obama's Gulf of Mexico Oil Spill Commission recommended establishing similar citizens' councils there and in the Arctic. The PWSRCAC expressed its willingness to help establish similar councils.
