= Devil's Canyon (Canadian County, Oklahoma) =

Natural forest in Canada

- Location within Oklahoma
- Location: Canadian County, Oklahoma
- Coordinates: 35°21′48″N 98°20′30″W
- Designated: 1974

Devil's Canyon in Canadian County, Oklahoma was designated a National Natural Landmark in December 1974. It was identified as having several different mesic plants in a diverse environment of oak woodland/tall prairie grass and eastern deciduous forest. It is privately owned.
