= Alaska Conservation Foundation =

American nonprofit organization

- Abbreviation: ACF
- Formation: 1980; 46 years ago
- Type: Nonprofit
- Tax ID no.: 92-0061466
- Legal status: 501(c)(3)
- Headquarters: Anchorage, Alaska
- Honorary Chair: President Jimmy Carter
- Board Chair: Rachael Posey
- Executive Director: Michael Barber
- Website: https://alaskaconservation.org/

Founded in 1980, the Alaska Conservation Foundation (ACF) is a nonprofit organization located in Anchorage, Alaska. Its focus is in finding ways to sustain Alaska's wildlife, coastlines, and mountains from the effects of climate change. ACF's largest contributions come from the funding that they provide for organizations around Alaska that follow a similar pursuit of environmental conservation. As of 2020, it is the only public foundation dedicated to conservation in Alaska. Through the support of individuals and foundations for nearly 40 years, ACF has awarded more than $52 million in grants to over 200 grassroots organizations and individuals working to protect and manage Alaska's natural resources.

Funding for the Alaska Conservation Foundation come primarily from grants and donations. These come from individuals, organizations, businesses, other foundations, etc... Donations come from in and out of the state of Alaska, with larger grants and donations typically coming from out-of-state organizations.

Smaller environmental organizations use the ACF to their advantage by applying for grants that they offer. The Alaskan Conservation Foundation then decides if and how much they will grant a certain organization. Typically, the groups that end up receiving funds are dedicated to public lands such as Bristol Bay, the Tongass, and the Arctic National Wildlife Refuge.

== Mission ==
ACF builds strategic leadership and support for Alaskan efforts to take care of wild lands, waters, and wildlife - which sustain diverse cultures, healthy communities, and prosperous economies. The Alaska Conservation Foundation provides financial support, among many other things, for Alaskan organizations and individuals that protects the state's natural environment. Those that are receiving grants provided by the ACF are focused on limiting and ultimately eliminating threats to Alaskan ecosystems. These threats include climate change, pollution, and soil degradation. The ACF has provided support for several organizations that are working on Alaska's most notable environmental situations, such as the protection of Bristol Bay from Pebble Mine. In 2019, the proposed Pebble Mine raised concern for many Alaskans as it threatened over 14,000 jobs, more than 30 Alaska Native Tribes, and a sockeye salmon fishery that's valued at more than $1.5 billion.

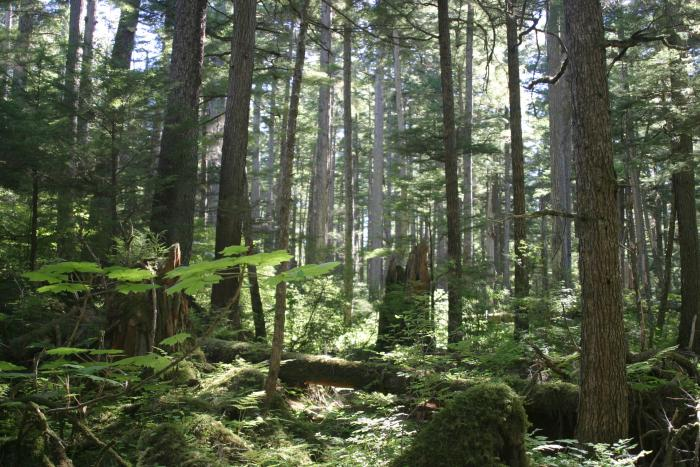
Tongass National Forest. Juneau, AK.

Along with Pebble Mine, two other initiatives have been prioritized by the Alaskan Conservation Foundation as of 2020. First, the preservation of the Tongass National Forest. Located in Southeast Alaska, the Tongass Natural Forest is the largest natural forest in the World. It currently faces a threat from the Alaskan Congressional Delegation which opened sections of the forest to dangerous logging procedures. This is notable because the Tongass draws a significant amount of excess carbon from the atmosphere, meaning that destruction to the forest could contribute to the current climate crisis. The Alaskan Conservation Foundation has provided funding to numerous organizations and individuals that are advocating for the conservation of the Tongass.

Another large focus of the ACF's is the preservation of the Arctic National Wildlife Refuge, a region of land that's home to a multitude of wildlife. In 2017, after being protected since 1960, Congress and then-U.S. president Donald Trump opened the Arctic Refuge to drilling for oil and gas. This process taking place causes a lot of concern for environmental activists due to the effect it can have on the land and its wildlife with heavy machinery, housing, and more. The Alaskan Conservation Foundation has expressed concerns towards the amount of research and intent that is going into this process. As they have done in similar situations, the ACF has provided funding towards organizations that are hoping to prevent these actions from taking place.

== Organization ==
ACF is a non-profit organization with approximately 13 full-time employees located in Alaska. It is governed by a national, 18-member volunteer board of directors. Nancy Lord, Alaska's poet laureate from 2008 to 2010, was elected to serve as board chair in 2010. The board of trustees includes Jimmy Carter and Doug McConnell.

== History ==
ACF was founded the same year the United States Congress passed the Alaska National Interest Lands Conservation Act. Co-founders Celia Hunter and Denny Wilcher were veterans of that campaign to protect more than 100 million acres (400,000 km^{2}) of Alaska's parks, refuges and national forests. In 1979 a group of environmental directors, led by Paul Lowe from Alaska, Bob Allen of Kendall Foundation in Boston, Dick Cooley, a professor at UC Santa Cruz, and Denny Wilcher of the Sierra Club Staff in San Francisco, met outside of Fairbanks, Alaska to discuss the early developments of a foundation that would assist in funding Alaskan conservation efforts. The prospective foundation would receive funding from other organizations across the United States through donations and grants. The funds earned would then be disbursed to organizations in Alaska that needed assistance. Typically, the money went towards an organizations operating expenses such as rent, utilities, payroll, etc...

Developments of this project took place quickly. Those who were involved early in the process were appointed positions within the foundation. The dean of Alaskan Conservationists, Celia Hunter, was named the chairperson of the trustees. Denny Wilcher was named president, making both Wilcher and Hunter the founders of the Alaska Conservation Foundation. Other early members were expanded and appointed to advising positions of their own.

By the end of 1983, The Alaska Conservation Foundation had received a total of $1,156,000 in funding. This led to them being able to disburse grants to 26 different Alaskan conservation organizations, totaling $610,000 in grants by the end of 1983.

== Capacity building ==
Alaska Conservation Foundation seeks to build the influence of Alaska's conservation movement through its community capacity initiative. Organizational capacity grants promote effective operations and leadership within Alaska's conservation organizations. The new Alaska Native Fund, launched in partnership with an Alaska Native steering committee, advances Alaska Native priorities for protecting our land and sustaining our ways of life. The conservation internship program focuses on developing the next generation of conservation leaders.

== Investments in the Future ==
The Alaska Conservation Foundation hires interns each Summer and appoint them to a non-profit organization. These organizations are devoted to conserving Alaskan land.

ACF is directly involved in the Arctic Youth Ambassador program, a system that puts young people from different Arctic regions in a position to learn about conservation efforts. They're then able to participate in conversations and conferences that cover climate change, subsistence, and other conservatory efforts.

ACF also houses staff members that represent the Northern Latitudes Partnership (NLP). The NLP collaborates with organizations from Alaska and Western Canada to find indigenous-lead solutions to issues in arctic regions. The NLP works to design resources and strategies that will mitigate the effect of floods and storms, while spreading knowledge about the perseverance of rural Alaska and different regions of Canada.

== Recognition ==
ACF received a four-out-of-four star rating from Charity Navigator, an independent organization that rates non-profits.

In 2010, ACF met the Better Business Bureau's 20 standards for charity accountability.

The watchdog service American Institute of Philanthropy awarded ACF an "A−" rating as one of the nation's top rated environmental nonprofits.

GuideStar recognizes ACF as a valued partner in the Guidestar exchange.

ACF received a Green Star Award for demonstrating strong environmental and business ethics by implementing the eight Green Star Standards.
