= Curry, Alaska =

Unincorporated community in the state of Alaska, United States

Curry, Alaska Dead Horse, Alaska
- Ghost town
- Location in the state of Alaska
- Coordinates: 62°36′53″N 150°00′43″W
- Country: United States
- State: Alaska
- Borough: Matanuska-Susitna

Government
  - Borough mayor: Vern Halter
- Elevation: 554 ft (169 m)
- Time zone: UTC-9 (Alaska (AKST))
  - Summer (DST): UTC-8 (AKDT)
- GNIS feature ID: 1400901

Curry is a ghost town in Matanuska-Susitna Borough, Alaska, United States. It was also known as Dead Horse (not to be confused with the community near the Arctic Ocean). Its post office was founded with that name as well.

== History ==
The old townsite of Curry is an uninhabited stop along the Alaska Railroad, about 22 miles north of Talkeetna. In 1922, the remote train station in the Alaska wilderness became a briefly popular luxury resort destination. Located alongside the Susitna River, Curry was billed "a wilderness palace" when the Railroad opened the first hotel in 1923. Curry was a common overnight stop for rail passengers, and with the hotel and renowned fishing. The town rose in population, and the resort became more popular as it expanded to include a golf course, and a suspension bridge.

In 1926, a fire destroyed the engine house and power plant, with the engine house being destroyed by fire again in 1933. The construction of a larger hotel in Denali National Park on 1939 drew visitors away from Curry, but the Railroad continued investing in the town, housing employees there in 1945. A boiler explosion occurred in 1946, completely destroying the power plant. The populace rebuilt the town, and added a new ski area. Finally, was a fire at the hotel in April 1957, in which three people were killed in the blaze. The hotel was not rebuilt, and Curry eventually became a ghost town.

== Transportation ==
The town is served by the Alaska Railroad's Aurora Winter Train. The stop contains no platforms, and is used by skiers skiing in the area.

Preceding station	Alaska Railroad	Following station
Chase toward Anchorage	Aurora Winter Train	Deadhorse toward Fairbanks
Chase toward Talkeetna	Hurricane Turn	Sherman toward Hurricane Gulch

== Demographics ==
Historical population
Census	Pop.	Note	%±
1930	91		—
1940	45		−50.5%
1950	183		306.7%
U.S. Decennial Census

Curry first appeared on the 1930 U.S. Census as an unincorporated village. It appeared again on 1940 and 1950.
