= Chase Depot =

Passenger train station in Chase, Alaska

Chase

General information
- Location: Chase Trail; Chase, AK 99676
- Coordinates: 62.4542°N 150.1182°W
- Owner: Alaska Railroad
- Platforms: 1 side platform
- Tracks: 1

History
- Opened: 1922

Services
Preceding station	Alaska Railroad	Following station
Talkeetna toward Anchorage	Aurora Winter Train	Curry toward Fairbanks
Talkeetna Terminus	Hurricane Turn	Curry toward Hurricane Gulch
Location

Chase Depot is a passenger train station in Chase, Alaska. The area offers service for the Alaska Railroad's Aurora Winter Train. The station is primarily used for hikers and backpackers traveling through the remote area of Chase. The station opened in 1922.
