= Talkeetna Depot =

Railroad station in Talkeetna, Alaska

Talkeetna
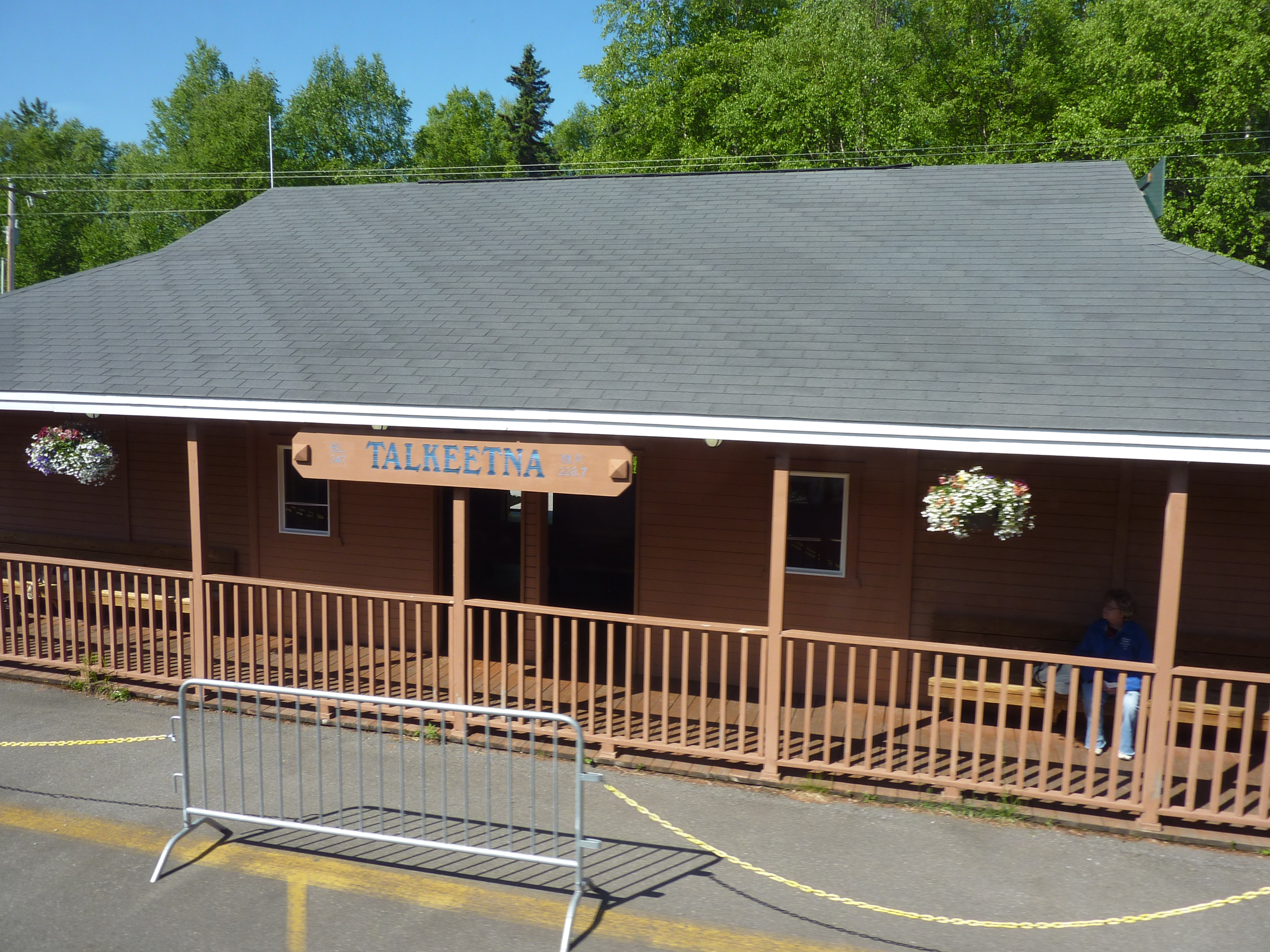

General information
- Location: 22945 Talkeetna Spur Road; Talkeetna, AK 99676
- Coordinates: 62.3238°N 150.1116°W
- Owner: Alaska Railroad
- Platforms: 1 side platform
- Tracks: 1

History
- Opened: 1997

Services
Preceding station	Alaska Railroad	Following station
Wasilla toward Anchorage	Denali Star	Denali toward Fairbanks
Wasilla toward Anchorage	Aurora Winter Train	Chase toward Fairbanks
Terminus	Hurricane Turn	Chase toward Hurricane Gulch
Wasilla (Winter service) toward Anchorage	Hurricane Turn	Chase toward Hurricane Gulch
Location

Talkeetna Depot is a freight and passenger railroad station in Talkeetna, Alaska. The station offers service for the Alaska Railroad's Denali Star and Aurora Winter Train routes.

The railroad sought to move Talkeetna's passenger stop in the late 1990s, selecting a site to the south of downtown and the historic depot. The new depot opened in August 1997. Freight operations were maintained at the old location.
