= Nenana Depot =

Nenana
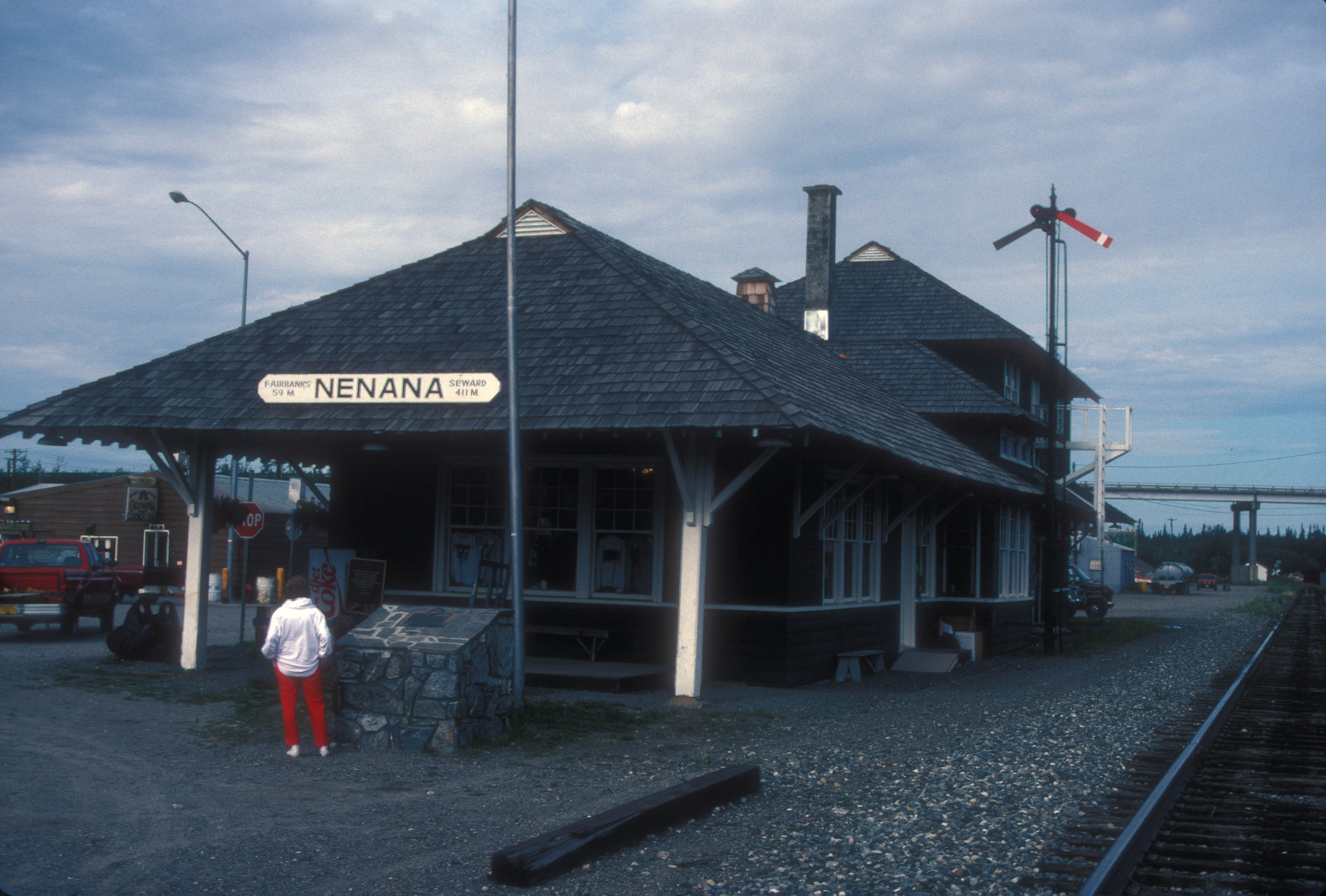

General information
- Location: 900 A Street; Nenana, Alaska
- Tracks: 1

History
- Opened: 1922

Services
Preceding station	Alaska Railroad	Following station
Healy toward Anchorage	Aurora Winter Train	Fairbanks Terminus
Denali toward Anchorage	Denali Star	Fairbanks Terminus
- Nenana Depot
- U.S. National Register of Historic Places
- Alaska Heritage Resources Survey
- Coordinates: 64°33′52″N 149°05′45″W
- Area: less than one acre
- Built: 1922
- Built by: R. Wood; Hartley Howard
- NRHP reference No.: 77000229
- AHRS No.: FAI-105

Significant dates
- Added to NRHP: August 10, 1977
- Designated AHRS: August 14, 1975
Location

The Nenana Depot, located at 900 A Street in Nenana, Alaska, is an Alaska Railroad depot built in 1922. The station served an extension of the railroad which was laid in 1916. An addition was placed on the station in 1937 to house the station agent. The station has served both as an important part of the railroad's northern operations and as a terminal for its riverboat service on the Yukon River. It was listed on the National Register of Historic Places in 1977.

In 1987 the Alaska State Railroad Museum was established in the depot. The Museum discontinued in 2017.

On November 11, 2020, the Friends of the Tanana Valley Railroad (FTVRR) signed with the City of Nenana to become the new caretakers of the depot. The FTVRR will reopen the depot as a museum after repairs and renovations. The museum will be open daily, May - September.

== See also ==
- National Register of Historic Places listings in Yukon–Koyukuk Census Area, Alaska
