= Wasilla Depot =

Railway station in Wasilla, Alaska, U.S.

Wasilla
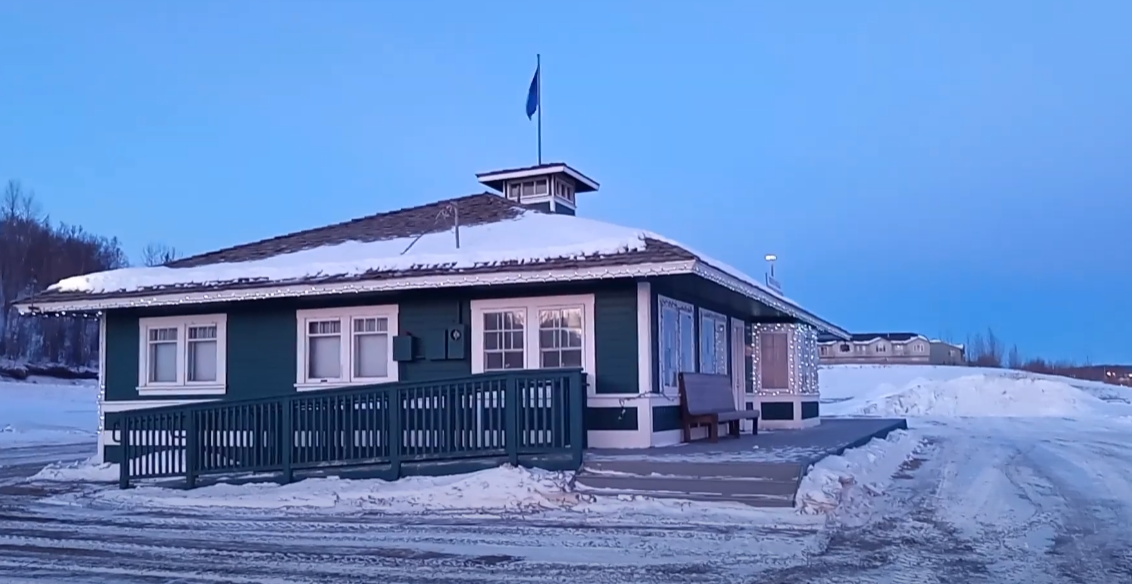
- The station in the new location in January 2024.

General information
- Location: 1105 East Depot Road; Wasilla, Alaska 99654 (formerly 4415 East Railroad Avenue)
- Owner: Alaska Railroad
- Platforms: 1 side platform
- Tracks: 1

History
- Opened: 1917

Services
Preceding station	Alaska Railroad	Following station
Anchorage Terminus	Denali Star	Talkeetna toward Fairbanks
Anchorage Terminus	Aurora Winter Train	Talkeetna toward Fairbanks
Anchorage Terminus	Hurricane Turn (Winter service)	Talkeetna toward Hurricane Gulch
- Wasilla Depot
- U.S. National Register of Historic Places
- Alaska Heritage Resources Survey
- Coordinates: 61°34′43″N 149°25′20″W
- Area: less than one acre
- Built: 1917
- Built by: Alaska Engineering Commission
- Architect: Alaska Engineering Commission
- NRHP reference No.: 77000218
- AHRS No.: ANC-088

Significant dates
- Added to NRHP: December 16, 1977
- Designated AHRS: August 14, 1975
Location

The Wasilla Depot is a railway station in Wasilla, Alaska, along the Alaska Railroad. The station building was constructed in 1917. It was designed and built by the Alaska Engineering Commission, a federal agency charged with building Alaska's railways.

The building was listed on the National Register of Historic Places in 1977. The structure was restored by the Lions Clubs and the Wasilla Chamber of Commerce.

Originally located near the intersection of Parks Highway and Knik Goose Bay Road, the station building was moved to its current location in 2020. Trains continued to stop at the old location, sans depot, until January 4, 2025, when trains began utilizing the moved depot.
