= Denali Depot =

Seasonal passenger railroad station in Denali National Park, Alaska, U.S.

Coordinates: 63.7306°N 148.9136°W

ARR Denali Park Depot
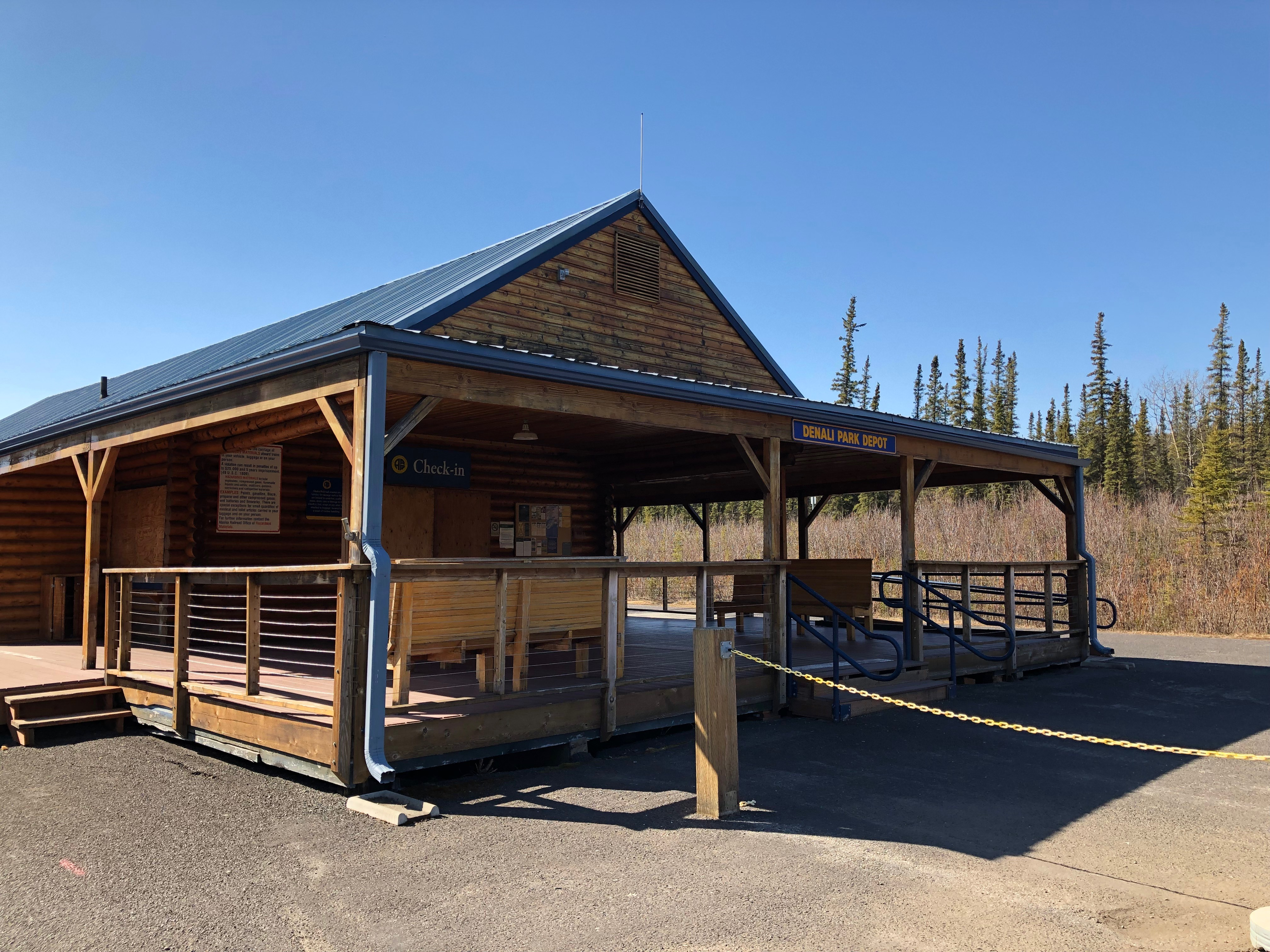

General information
- Location: Mile 1.25 Denali National Park Road; Denali Park, AK 99755
- Owner: Alaska Railroad
- Platforms: 1 side platform
- Tracks: 1

Services
Preceding station	Alaska Railroad	Following station
Talkeetna toward Anchorage	Denali Star	Nenana toward Fairbanks
Hurricane toward Anchorage	Aurora Winter Train	Healy toward Fairbanks
Location

Denali Park Depot (formerly McKinley Park Station) is a seasonal passenger railroad station located within Denali National Park. It is adjacent to the visitor center and McKinley National Park Airport located in Denali Park. The station offers service for the Alaska Railroad's Denali Star route between mid-May and Mid-September and the Aurora Winter Train in winter as a flag stop.

Development of the area where the station would be began in 1914 as gold prospectors passed through going north. Mount McKinley National Park was established in 1917, and in 1921, the Alaska Engineering Commission selected the site near the intended park entrance at Riley Creek to become McKinley Park Station. The railroad to Fairbanks was completed in 1923. The railroad was the only way to reach the national park and the community known as McKinley Station or McKinley Park Station until the Denali Highway was completed in 1957.

The first depot was a converted rail box car and was also the post office. President Warren G. Harding became the only sitting president to visit the national park when he briefly stopped at the station in July 1923. A rustic building was constructed to be the train depot in 1925. The Alaska Road Commission used the depot to receive and stage materials for the 1923–1938 construction of the 90-mile Park Road to Kantishna. In 1932 the park boundary was expanded to include the depot and park headquarters.

The Alaska Railroad built nearby McKinley Park Hotel for passengers in 1939; at the time one daily train in each direction stopped at the station. After it burned down in 1972, a new hotel called McKinley Park Station Hotel was quickly built out of railroad cars converted into rooms. until it closed in 2001. A youth hostel was also built out of three railroad bunk cars placed on the depot's side track. The hotel was intended to be temporary but proved popular with guests and remained open until 2001.

In 1953, the National Park Service took over 205 acres owned by the Alaska Railroad, including the depot, hotel, and other buildings.

The park relied on its own power plant with coal delivered by rail for electricity until 1981, when a power line was built from Fairbanks to the depot above the railroad tracks.

A modern depot was built in 1988, and it was expanded in 2003 to improve facilities at a cost of about $6 million.

In 1995, 128,000 visitors to Denali National Park arrived by train, about a quarter of all visitors.
