= Seward Depot =

- U.S. National Register of Historic Places
- Alaska Heritage Resources Survey
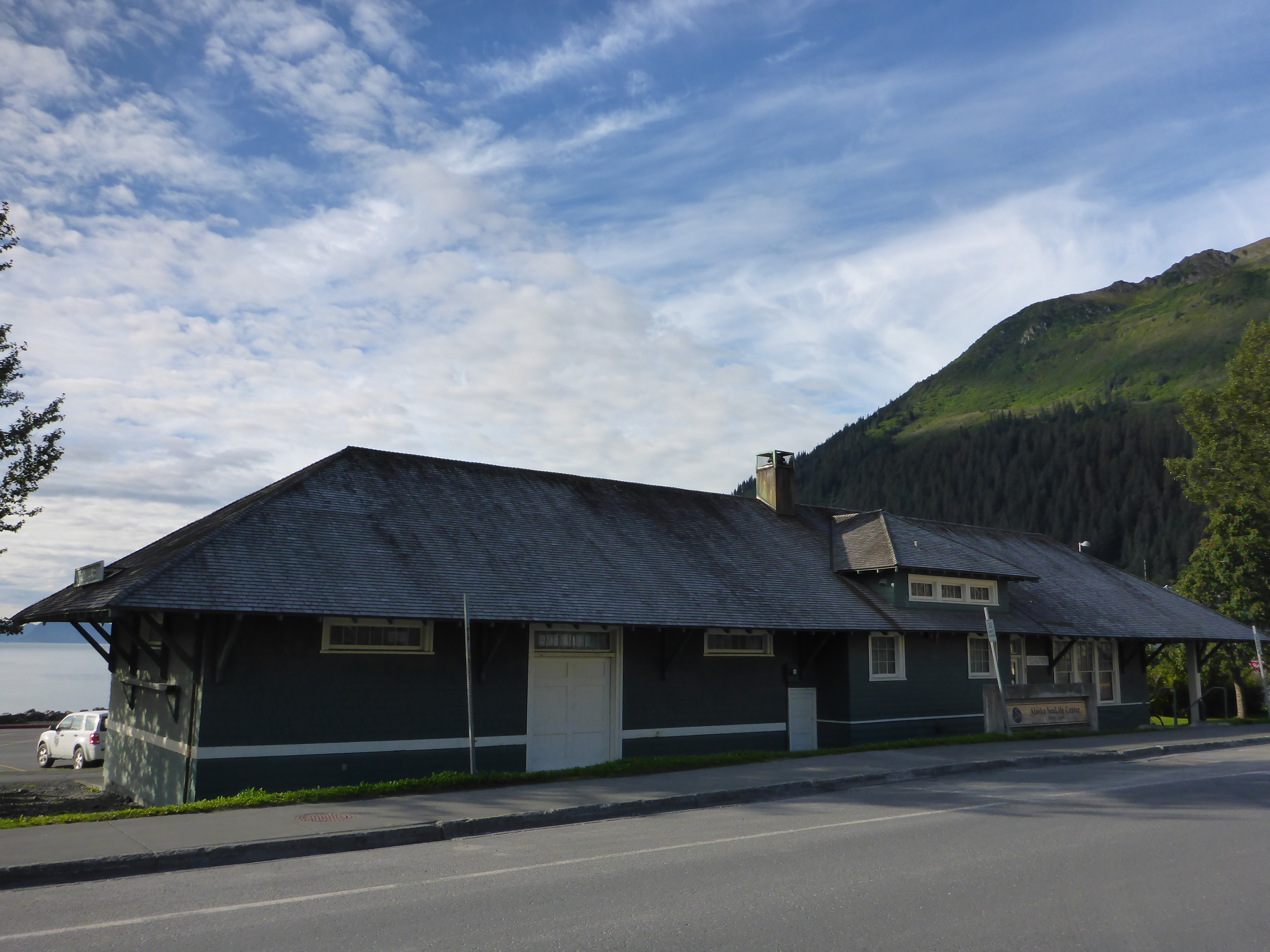

- Location within Alaska
- Location: 501 Railway Avenue, Seward, Alaska
- Coordinates: 60°6′3″N 149°26′20″W
- Area: 0.6 acres (0.24 ha)
- Built: 1917
- Architect: Alaska Engineering Commission
- Architectural style: American Craftsman Bungalow
- NRHP reference No.: 87000652
- AHRS No.: SEW-001

Significant dates
- Added to NRHP: July 16, 1987
- Designated AHRS: 1971

The Seward Depot, also known as the Seward Station, is a former rail depot in Seward, Alaska, United States.

The depot was constructed in 1917 at what is now Adams Street and Ballaine Boulevard to serve the railroad line. Seward was and remains the southern terminus of the Alaska Railroad. The Seward line was owned by the Alaska Central Railroad, the Alaska Northern Railroad, and at the time of the depot's construction, the U.S. government. President Warren G. Harding visited Seward and Alaska in 1923, and following completion of the Mears Memorial Bridge, drove the ceremonial golden spike at Nenana, connecting Seward with Fairbanks.

In 1928 the building was moved to its current location on Railway Avenue following a flood of Lowell Creek.

Much of the railyard in Seward and the track north along the Turnagain Arm were destroyed in the Good Friday earthquake and the subsequent tsunami that hit the town, and the depot was out of use. It served as the headquarters for the Alaska Marine Highway's Tustumena for a time. In 1998 it was sold to the Chugach Alaska Corporation after the corporation completed renovations, and the building served as a native cultural center for three years. It is currently owned by the Seward Association of the Advancement of Marine Science, dba, Alaska SeaLife Center, who lease it for operation as a cafe.

Hoben Park, also listed on the National Register of Historic Places, is adjacent to the depot. Both are located at the southernmost point in Seward.

== Modern railway station ==
The modern depot on Port Avenue was built between 1997 and 1998. It is the terminal of the seasonal Coastal Classic.

Preceding station	Alaska Railroad	Following station
Girdwood toward Anchorage	Coastal Classic	Terminus

== See also ==
- National Register of Historic Places listings in Kenai Peninsula Borough, Alaska
