= Hoben Park =

- U.S. National Register of Historic Places
- Alaska Heritage Resources Survey
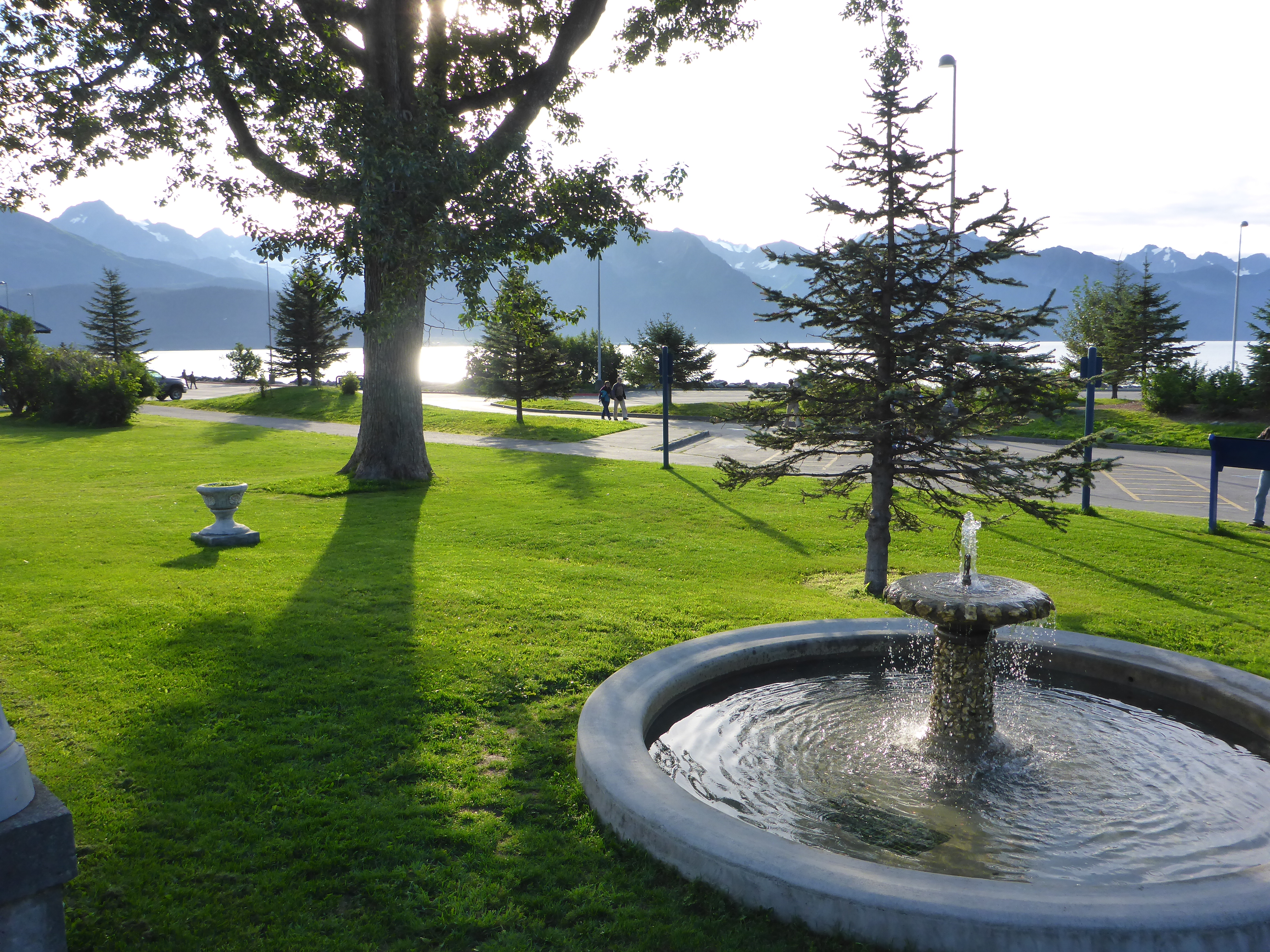
- Hoben Park in 2013

- Location within Alaska
- Location: 401 Railway Avenue, Seward, Alaska
- Coordinates: 60°6′1″N 149°26′23″W
- Area: less than one acre
- Built: 1923
- NRHP reference No.: 06000515
- AHRS No.: SEW-00662
- Added to NRHP: June 21, 2006

Hoben Park, also known as Arcade Park, Nile Park and Ladies Park, is a city park on the waterfront of Seward, Alaska. It is bounded by the Alaska Sealife Center, the Seward Depot, Railroad Avenue, and Resurrection Bay. The park's north and west sides have a decorative concrete wall, part of which is original to the park's 1923 construction date. The park has been generally restored to its 1920s appearance, although the north side has been shortened due to road widening. Construction of park formed a major part of the city's self-promotion as the "Gateway to Alaska", and was timed to be finished in time for the visit to the city by President Warren G. Harding on July 13, 1923, when completion of the Alaska Railroad was celebrated. The park is named for Hedley V. "Harry" Hoben, a prominent local citizen who was mayor in 1918–19. Hoben promoted the park and paid for its maintenance until his death in 1948.

The park was listed on the National Register of Historic Places in 2006.

== See also ==
- National Register of Historic Places listings in Kenai Peninsula Borough, Alaska
