= Happy, Alaska =

Happy
- Locale
- Location in the state of Alaska
- Coordinates: 64°53′15″N 147°55′30″W
- Country: United States
- State: Alaska
- Census area: Fairbanks
- Named for: Happy Creek
- Elevation: 623 ft (190 m)
- Time zone: UTC−9 (AKST)
  - Summer (DST): UTC−8 (AKDT)
- GNIS feature ID: 1403158

Happy is a former railroad station at mile 463 of the Alaska Railroad in Happy Creek valley, 8 miles northwest of the City of Fairbanks in the Fairbanks Northstar Borough, Alaska, United States.

== History ==
Happy was a local name derived from Happy Creek (one of five or six creeks in Alaska by that name) and published on a timetable in 1922. The rail line through Happy was constructed as part of the Tanana Valley Railroad in the early 1900s. The railway was acquired by the Alaska Engineering Commission in 1917, which connected and improved the line from Fairbanks through Happy to Nenana and beyond to Seward, AK.

Borehole investigations in the vicinity of Happy Creek in 1970 found bedrock as much as 370 feet below the surface, buried beneath undifferentiated quaternary silts. Aerial remote sensing indicated increased magnetic intensities suggesting mineral deposits in the center of the valley (where bedrock depths have exceeded economically feasible ranges for placer mining operations). The flight path for the aerial investigation parallels placer mining claims between Happy Creek and St. Patrick Creek previously registered in 1938.
