= Alaska Engineering Commission Cottage No. 23 =

Historic house in Alaska, United States

- A. E. C. Cottage No. 23
- U.S. National Register of Historic Places
- Alaska Heritage Resources Survey
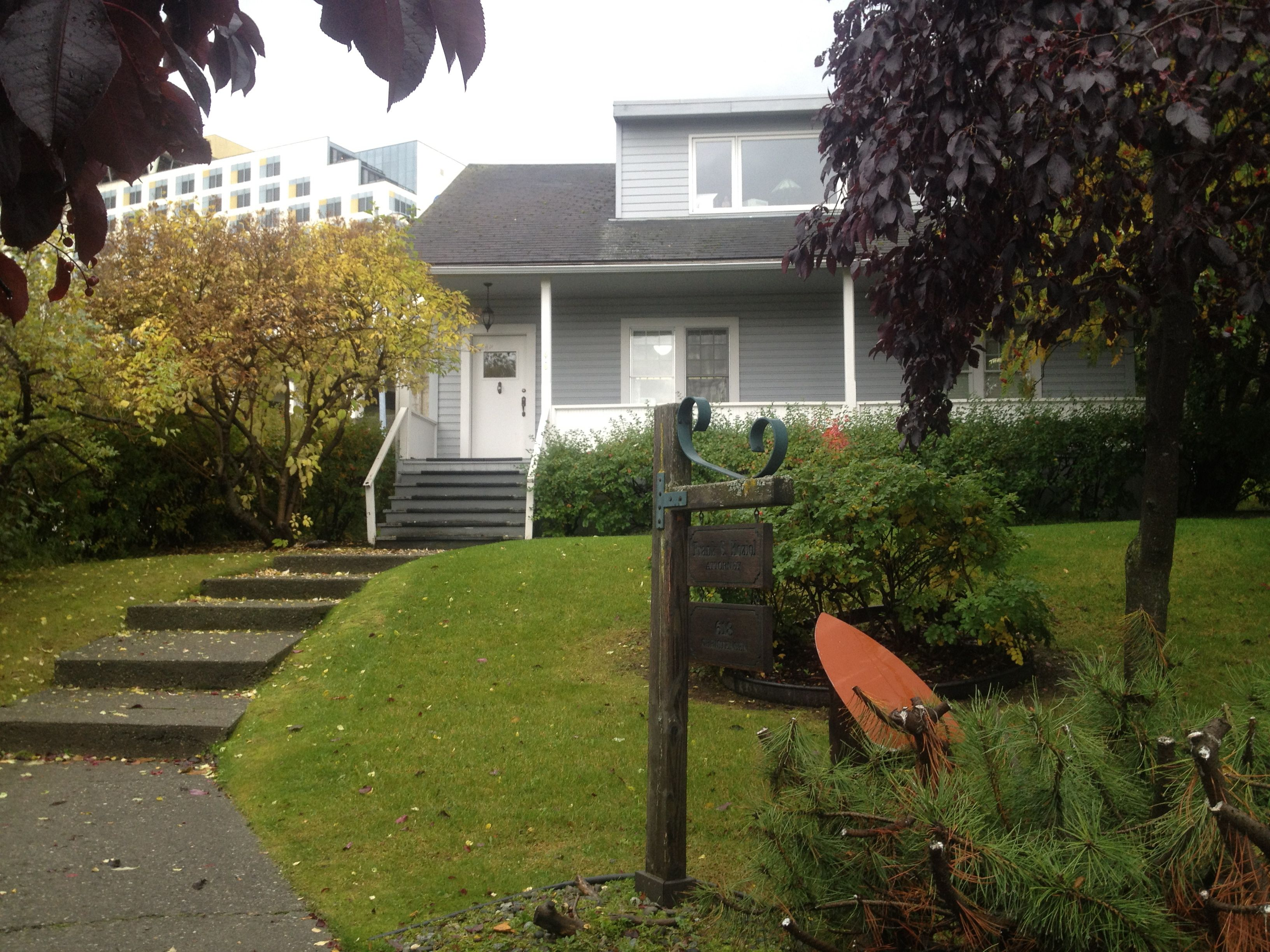

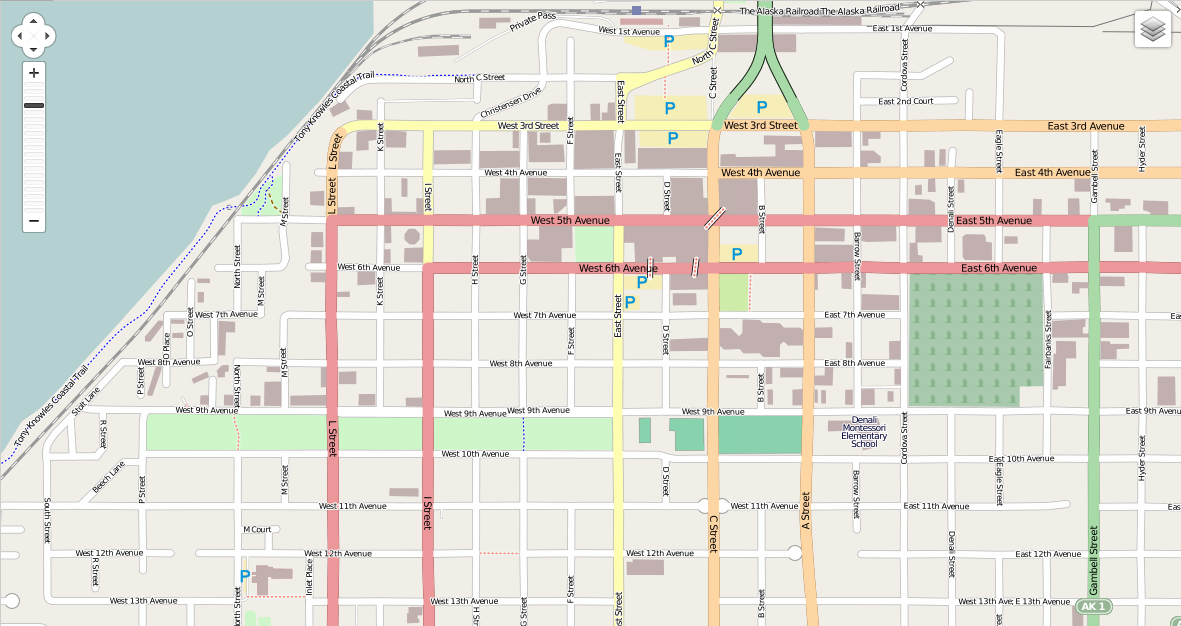
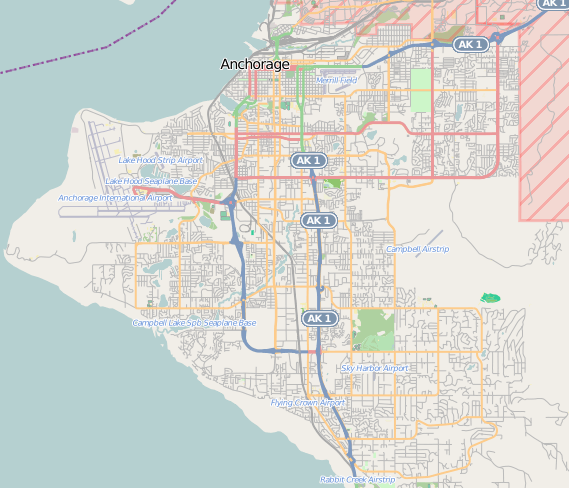
- Location within Downtown Anchorage Location within Anchorage Location within Alaska
- Location: 618 Christensen Drive, Anchorage, Alaska
- Coordinates: 61°13′12″N 149°53′40″W
- Area: less than one acre
- Built: 1916
- Built by: Alaska Engineering Commission
- Architectural style: Bungalow/craftsman
- NRHP reference No.: 90000825
- AHRS No.: ANC-325
- Added to NRHP: June 11, 1990

The Alaska Engineering Commission Cottage No. 23, also known as DeLong Cottage, is an historic house at 618 Christensen Drive in Anchorage, Alaska. It is a 1 1/2-story wood-frame structure, with a gable roof and porch extending across its front. It was designed and built in 1916 by the Alaska Engineering Commission (A.E.C.), the federal government project to build the Alaska Railroad. Of the surviving cottages built by the commission, it is the least-altered and best-preserved.

The cottage was listed on the National Register of Historic Places in 1990 as A. E. C. Cottage No. 23. It has also been known as DeLong Cottage.

== See also ==
- Alaska Engineering Commission Cottage No. 25
- National Register of Historic Places listings in Anchorage, Alaska
