= Hurricane Gulch Bridge =

- Coordinates: 63°0′54″N 149°37′0″W
- Carries: Alaska Railroad
- Crosses: Hurricane Gulch (tributary of Chulitna River)
- Locale: Hurricane Gulch
- Maintained by: Alaska Railroad

Characteristics
- Design: Arch
- Width: 8 ft (2.4 m), 1 track with a walkway on one side
- Longest span: 918 ft (279.8 m)
- Clearance above: Deck arch, unlimited clearance
- Clearance below: 296 ft (90 m)

History
- Opened: August 15, 1921; 104 years ago

Location
- Interactive map of Hurricane Gulch Bridge

The Hurricane Gulch Bridge is a 918-foot (280 m) long steel arch railroad bridge that crosses Hurricane Gulch, Alaska. It is located at milepost 284.2, counting from Seward. At 296 feet (90 m) above the Hurricane creek, it is both the longest and tallest bridge on the entire Alaska Railroad. Many of Alaska Railroad's passenger trains pass over this bridge, including the Denali Star, the Aurora Winter and the flag-stop Hurricane Turn, in addition to freight movements.

A road bridge by the same name also exists upstream and slightly east of the rail bridge.

== Construction ==
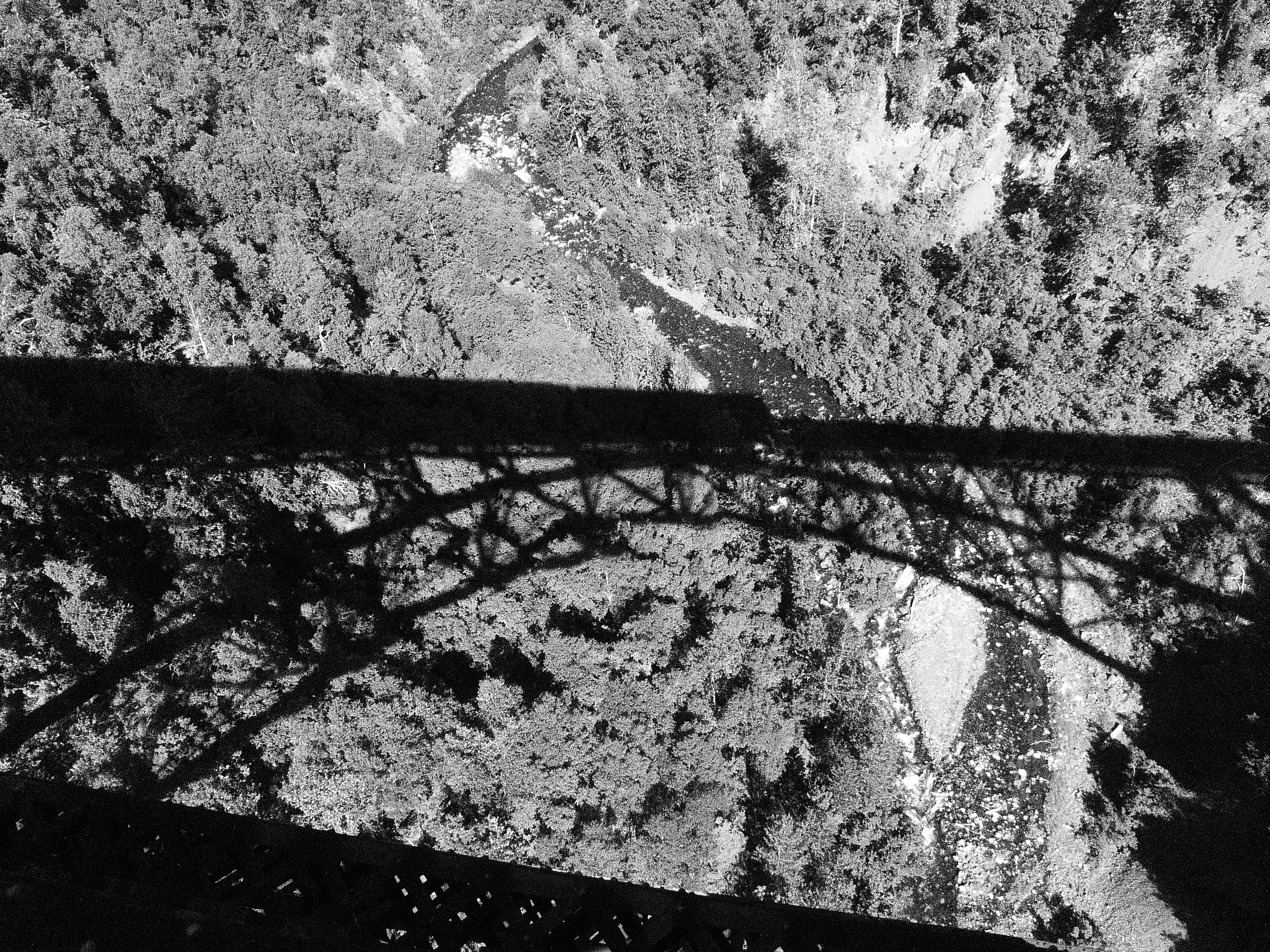
Shadow of the Hurricane Gulch bridge taken from a train crossing over it

Construction of this bridge by the American Bridge Company began in early 1921. The first steel was erected in June, and the first passenger train operated on August 15 of the same year. It was the most difficult and expensive bridge project on the railroad, and cost $1.2 million (equivalent to $21.7 million in 2025 adjusted for inflation). To build it, the company strung an aerial tram across the gulch, and construction proceeded from both sides simultaneously. For eight years, this was the tallest bridge in the US.

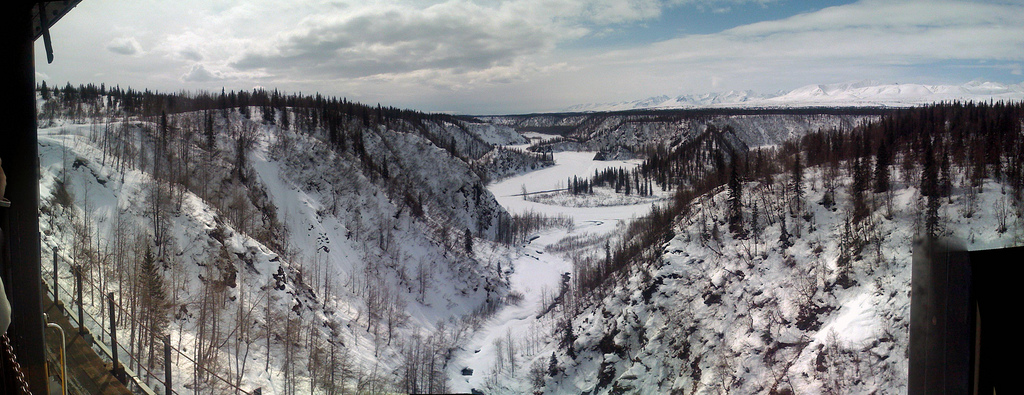
Panorama of Hurricane Gulch taken from the bridge

== See also ==
- List of bridges in the United States by height
