= Whitney Section House =

Historic house in Alaska, United States

- U.S. National Register of Historic Places
- Alaska Heritage Resources Survey
- Location within Alaska
- Location: Alaska Museum of Transportation and Industry, 3800 West Museum Drive, Wasilla, Alaska
- Coordinates: 61°34′38″N 149°32′36″W
- Area: less than one acre
- Built: 1917
- Built by: Alaska Railroad
- Architect: Alaska Engineering Commission
- NRHP reference No.: 04001106
- AHRS No.: ANC-00044
- Added to NRHP: October 6, 2004

The Whitney Section House, also known as Whitney Station, is a historic railroad-related building in Wasilla, Alaska. It is a single-story wood-frame structure, which was built in 1917 by the Alaska Railroad. It originally stood at mile 119.1, about 4.8 miles (7.7 km) north of Anchorage Station, and was one of a series built by the railroad and located at roughly ten-mile intervals. The area where it stood was taken by the federal government for Elmendorf Air Force Base, and was rescued from demolition by the local chapter of the National Railroad Historical Society. It now stands on the grounds of the Alaska Museum of Transportation and Industry in Wasilla, and has seen a variety of uses.

The building was listed on the National Register of Historic Places in 2004.

== See also ==
- National Register of Historic Places listings in Matanuska-Susitna Borough, Alaska
