= William C. Edes =

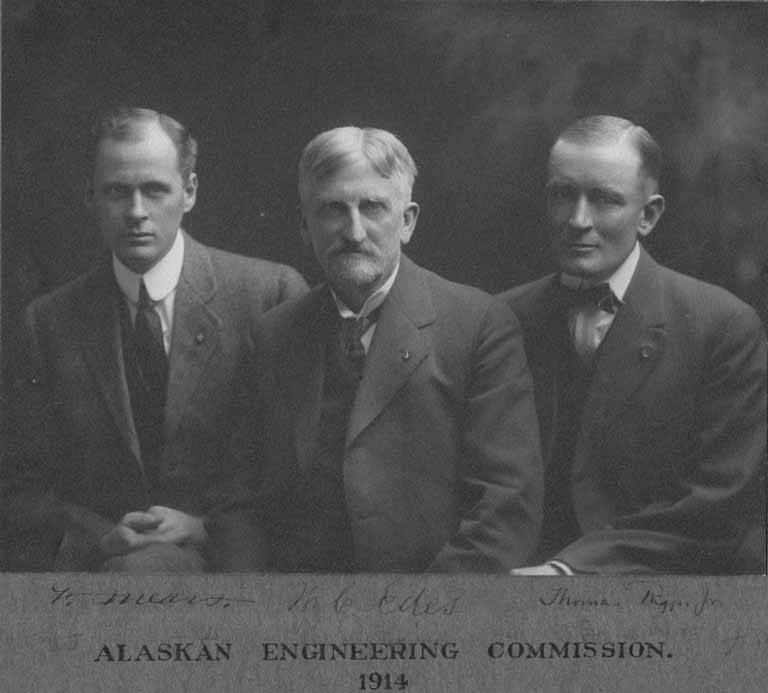
- Born: January 14, 1856
- Died: May 25, 1922 (aged 66)
- Education: Massachusetts Institute of Technology
- Engineering career
- Discipline: civil engineering

William C. Edes (January 14, 1856 – May 25, 1922) was a U.S. civil engineer. He was the chairman and former chief engineer of the Alaskan Engineering Commission.

== Early years ==
Born in 1856 at Bolton, Massachusetts, he graduated from Massachusetts Institute of Technology in 1875 with a degree in civil engineering.

== Career ==
From 1878 to 1882, he was with the Southern railway on location of line through Arizona, New Mexico and Texas. From 1882 to 1886, he was in private practice, engaged in general engineering work in Boston and vicinity. He re-entered railway service in 1886, serving as assistant engineer from April, 1886, to February, 1887; he was in charge of constructing a portion of the Oregon & California railroad. He became chief assistance engineer of the San Francisco & San Joaquin Valley in 1896, and in 1901 re-entered the service of the Southern Pacific as assistant engineer, where he was engaged in locating new lines and supervising the reconstruction of other lines, including the Central Pacific from Rocklin, California, to Truckee, California until 1905, when he became district engineer maintenance of way, with headquarters at San Francisco. Edes resigned as district engineer of the Southern Pacific Co. in January 1907 to become chief engineer of the Northwestern Pacific Railroad. In 1914, he was appointed chairman of the Alaskan Engineering Commission by U.S. President Woodrow Wilson. In 1919, he assumed the title of consulting engineer, a position he relinquished in March 1920, to engage in private consulting work.

He died on a train near Merced, California in 1922. Edes Lake in Alaska was named in his honor.
