= Alaska Engineering Commission Cottage No. 25 =

Historic house in Alaska, United States

- U.S. National Register of Historic Places
- Alaska Heritage Resources Survey
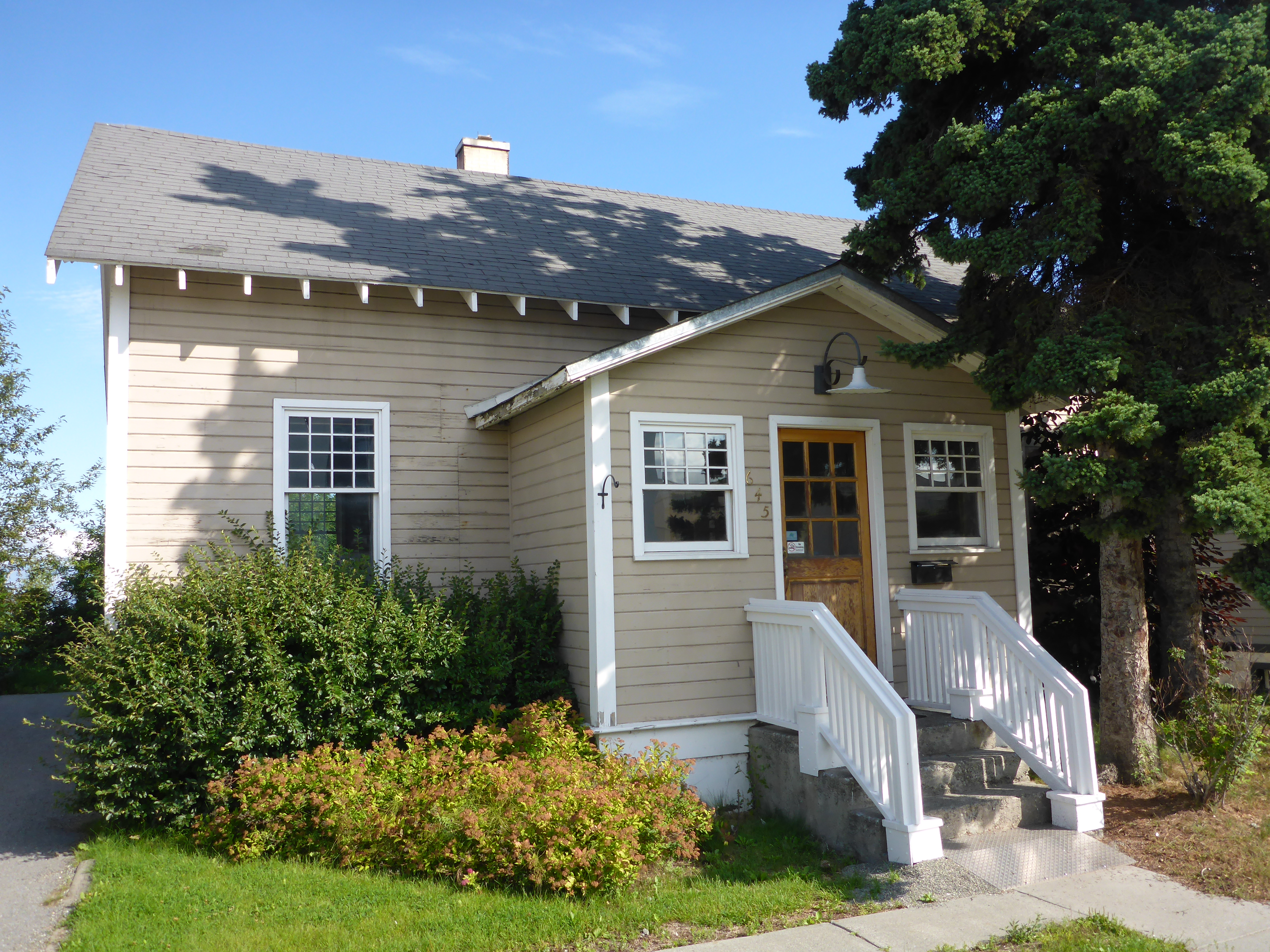

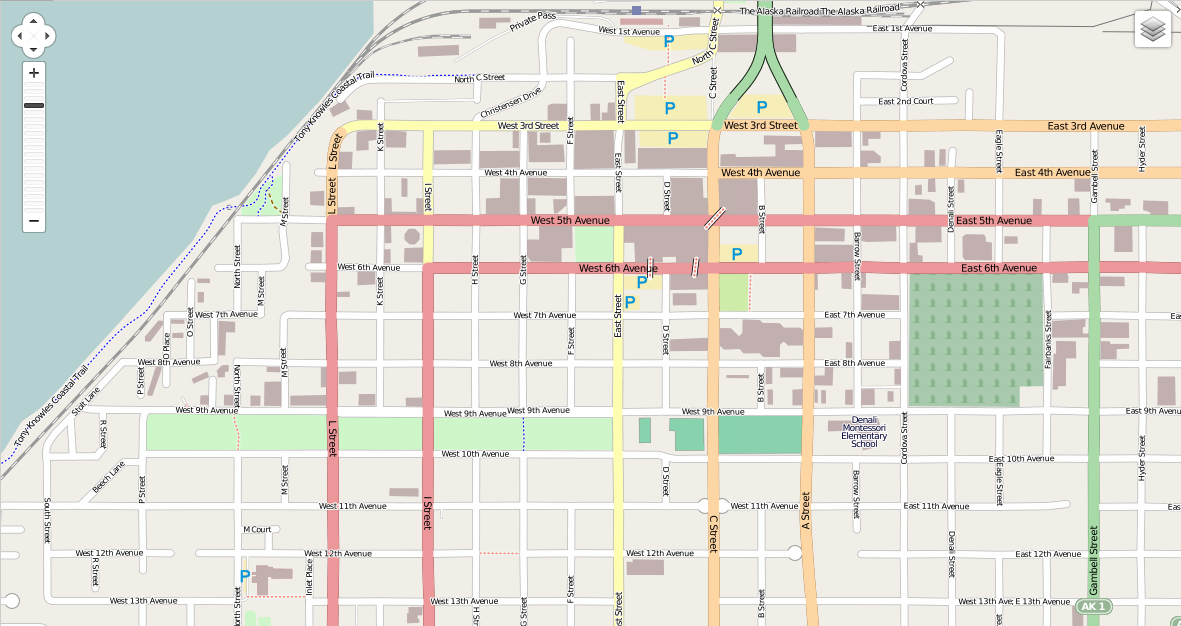
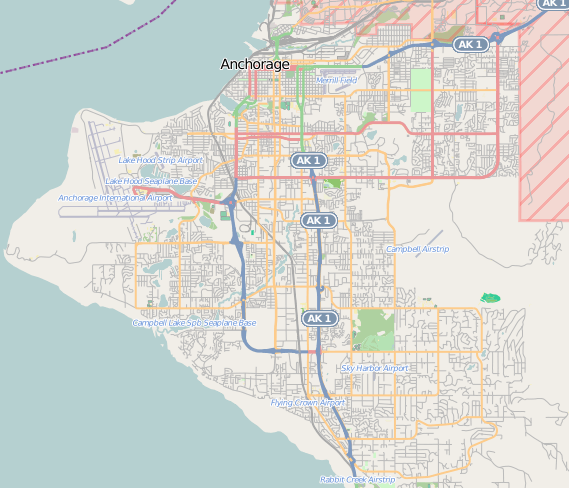
- Location within Downtown Anchorage Location within Anchorage Location within Alaska
- Location: 645 West 3rd Avenue, Anchorage, Alaska
- Coordinates: 61°13′11″N 149°53′43″W
- Area: less than one acre
- Built: 1917
- Built by: Alaska Engineering Commission
- Architect: Alaska Engineering Commission
- Architectural style: Bungalow/craftsman
- NRHP reference No.: 96000094
- AHRS No.: ANC-330
- Added to NRHP: February 16, 1996

The Alaska Engineering Commission Cottage No. 25 is a historic house at 345 West Third Avenue in Anchorage, Alaska. It is a two-story wood-frame structure, with a low-pitch gable roof that has wide overhanging eaves with exposed rafter tails. It was designed and built in 1917 by the Alaska Engineering Commission, a Federal agency charged with building railways in Alaska. It is one of the second set of such housing built by the commission, and is now owned by Anchorage Historic Properties.

The cottage was listed on the National Register of Historic Places in 1996.

== See also ==
- A. E. C. Cottage No. 23
- National Register of Historic Places listings in Anchorage, Alaska
