= Denali Star =

Passenger and semi-luxury train operated by the Alaska Railroad

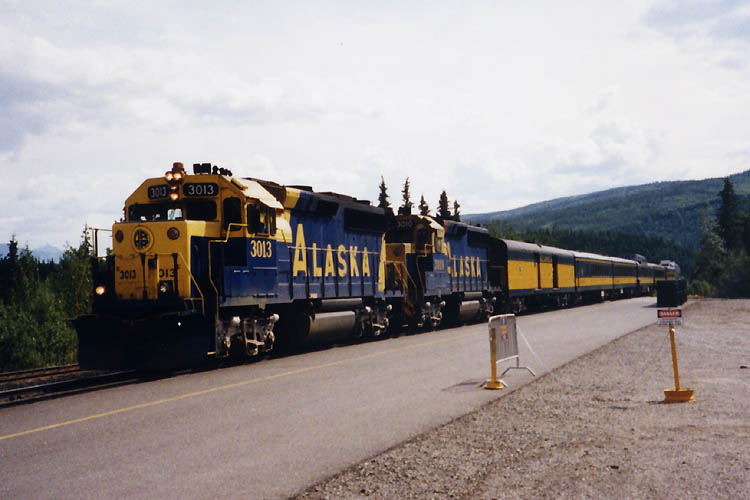
- Denali Star at Denali

Overview
- Service type: Inter-city/Luxury
- Status: Operating
- Locale: Alaska
- Current operator(s): Alaska Railroad

Route
- Termini: Anchorage; Fairbanks
- Stops: 5
- Distance travelled: 358 mi (576 km)
- Average journey time: 11 hours 45 minutes
- Service frequency: Daily (May through September)

On-board services
- Class(es): "Adventure" and "GoldStar Service"
- Observation facilities: Viewing deck and dome car
- Entertainment facilities: Tour Guide
- Baggage facilities: Available at Anchorage, Talkeetna, Denali National Park, and Fairbanks

Technical
- Track gauge: 4 ft 8 1/2 in (1,435 mm) standard gauge
- Operating speed: 60 mph (97 km/h)
- Track owner(s): Alaska Railroad

The Denali Star is a passenger and semi-luxury train operated by the Alaska Railroad between the cities of Anchorage and Fairbanks, Alaska. It is a seasonal train, only operating between the months of May and September. The Aurora Winter Train operates along the similar route during the rest of the year at a less frequent weekend schedule. The train is ridden by many tourists visiting the Denali National Park. The train consists of single level coaches and dome cars.

In 2020, summer services began in July in response to the COVID-19 pandemic.

== Stations ==
The Denali Star stops only at the following stations:

- Anchorage
- Wasilla
- Talkeetna
- Denali
- Fairbanks

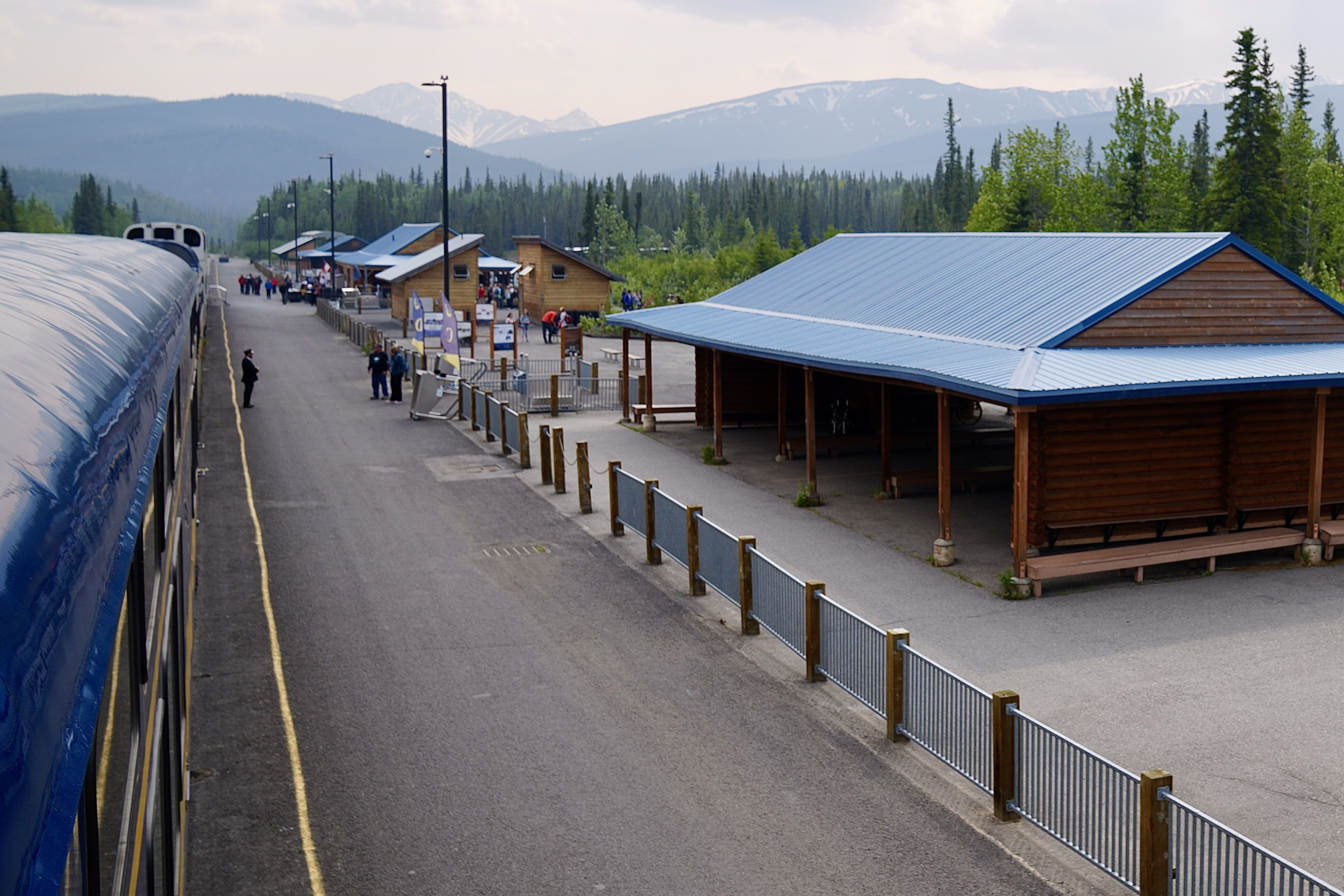
Denali Park Depot is a seasonal passenger railroad station located within Denali National Park. It is adjacent to the visitor center located in Denali Park.
