= Aurora Winter Train =

Train service in Alaska, U.S.

Overview
- Service type: Inter-city/Flag stop
- Status: Operating
- Locale: Alaska
- First service: October 18, 1947
- Current operator: Alaska Railroad

Route
- Termini: Anchorage; Fairbanks
- Stops: 15
- Distance travelled: 358 mi (576 km)
- Average journey time: 11 hours 45 minutes
- Service frequency: Weekends (Between September and May)

On-board services
- Catering facilities: Cafe car
- Baggage facilities: Available in Anchorage, Talkeetna, and Fairbanks

Technical
- Track gauge: 4 ft 8 1/2 in (1,435 mm) standard gauge
- Track owner: Alaska Railroad

The Aurora Winter Train, operated by the Alaska Railroad, provides passenger service between the cities of Anchorage and Fairbanks, Alaska. It is a seasonal train, only operating during the non-summer months. It is similar to the Hurricane Turn in that in addition to its scheduled stops it makes flag stops, making its schedule unpredictable. The northbound train operates on Saturdays, while the southbound train operates on Sundays.

== Station stops ==
The Aurora Winter Train makes the following scheduled stops

- Anchorage
- Wasilla
- Talkeetna
- Chase
- Curry
- Sherman
- Gold Creek
- Canyon
- Twin Bridges
- Chulitna
- Hurricane
- Denali
- Healy
- Nenana
- Fairbanks

Alaska Railroad route 4 ft 8 1/2 in (1,435 mm) gauge tracks, paved roads
