= Tanana Valley Railroad =

Transport company in United States of America

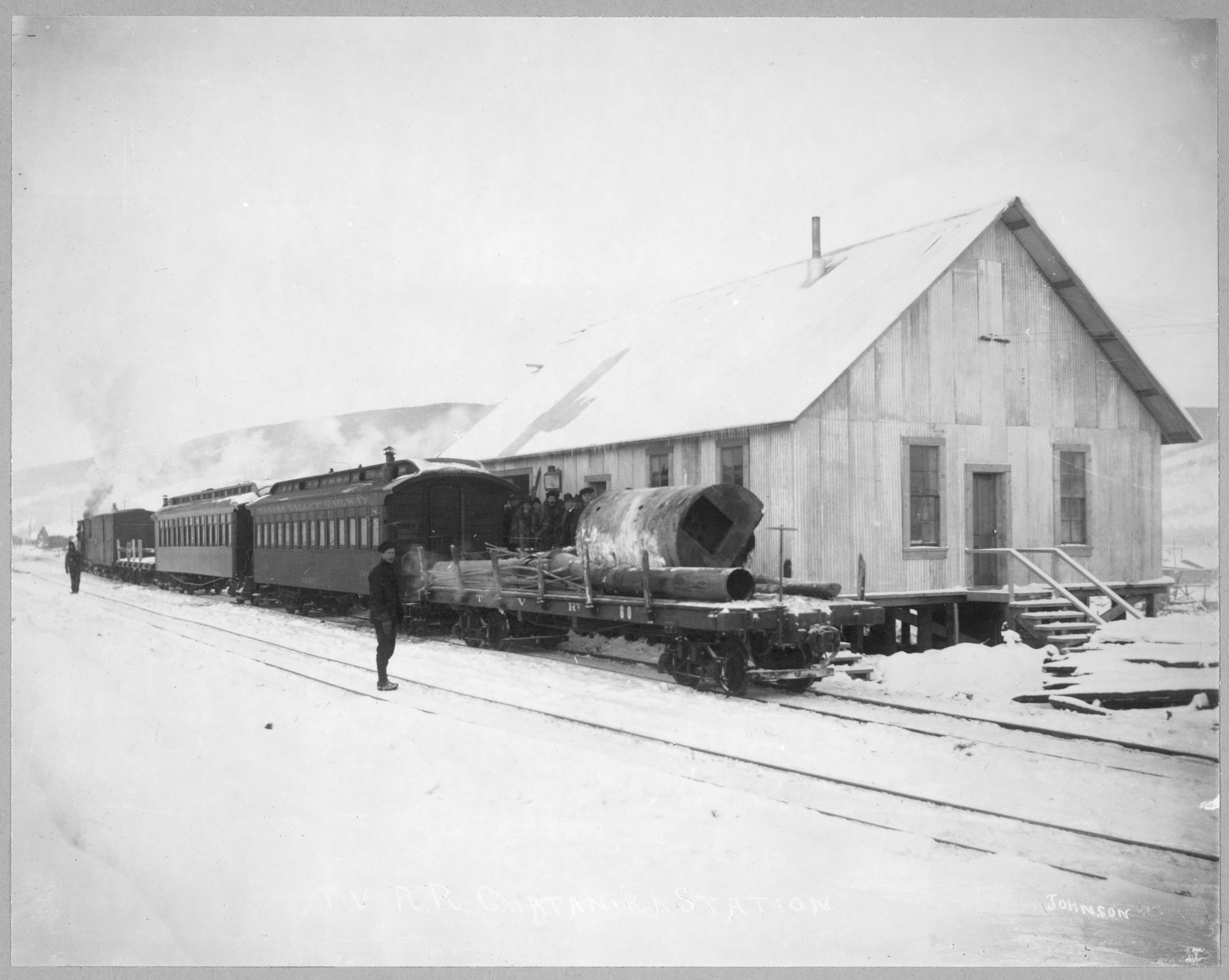
- Train of the Tanana Valley Railroad at the station in Chatanika, Alaska, 1916.

Overview
- Headquarters: Fairbanks
- Locale: Fairbanks to Chatanika
- Dates of operation: 1904/1905–1917; AEC purchased TVRR assets and operated the Chatanika Branch line until decommissioning it in 1930
- Predecessor: Tanana Mines Railway
- Successor: Alaskan Engineering Commission Railroad, a.k.a. Alaska Railroad

Technical
- Track gauge: 3 ft (914 mm)
- Length: 45 miles (72 km)

Location of Tanana Valley Railroad

The Tanana Valley Railroad (TVRR) was a 3 ft (914 mm) narrow gauge railroad that operated in the Tanana Valley of Alaska from 1905 to about 1917. A portion of the railroad later became part of the Alaska Railroad.

== History ==
The TVRR was incorporated as the Tanana Mines Railway in 1904, construction on the first section started and completed in 1905. The main speaker at the gala golden spike ceremony was Judge Wickersham and Mrs. Isabelle Barnett accepted the golden spike. The builder was Falcon Joslin who was called the "Harriman of the North". It was renamed the Tanana Valley Railroad in 1907. The company declared bankruptcy and was liquidated c. 1917. The U.S. government purchased the railroad in June 1917. The section between Fairbanks and Happy was converted to dual gauge by the Alaskan Engineering Commission, in order to complete a 4 ft 8 1/2 in (1,435 mm) standard gauge railroad line from Seward to Fairbanks. This line became the Alaska Railroad (Alaska RR) in 1923. The Alaska RR continued to operate the former TVRR narrow-gauge line as the Chatanika Branch, until decommissioning it in 1930.

== Preservation ==
In 1922, the railroad's Engine No. 1, the first steam locomotive in Fairbanks and the Yukon, was retired. Its restoration was begun in 1997 and completed in 2000. As of 2011 it is still being steamed up several times a year. A small museum for the engine was built in 2005 in Pioneer Park. On July 20, 2019, Engine #1 was a star attraction when it operated on its 120th birthday at a reenactment of the TVRR's Golden Spike ceremony.

== See also ==
- Falcon Joslin House, originally owned by the railroad's founder
