= Tanana River Bridge =

Railroad bridge in Alaska, US

Coordinates: 64.5586525°N 147.0716107°W

Tanana River Bridge is a bridge over the Tanana River in Alaska, United States.

It is 3,300 feet (1,000 m) long, making it the longest bridge in Alaska, and was completed in August 2014.

It is planned as a combined road and railroad bridge, but the first years it will be a road bridge only. The extension of Alaska Railroad to Delta Junction is planned to use the bridge. More than half of the funding came from the Department of Defense, since it connects to military facilities on the west side of the river.

== See also ==
- The Mears Memorial Bridge for the Alaska Railroad over the Tanana river at Nenana is sometimes called the Tanana River Bridge
- The 1,290 feet (390 m) bridge of the George Parks Highway next to the Mears Memorial Bridge, is also sometimes called the Tanana River Bridge
