= Coastal Classic =

Passenger train in Alaska, US

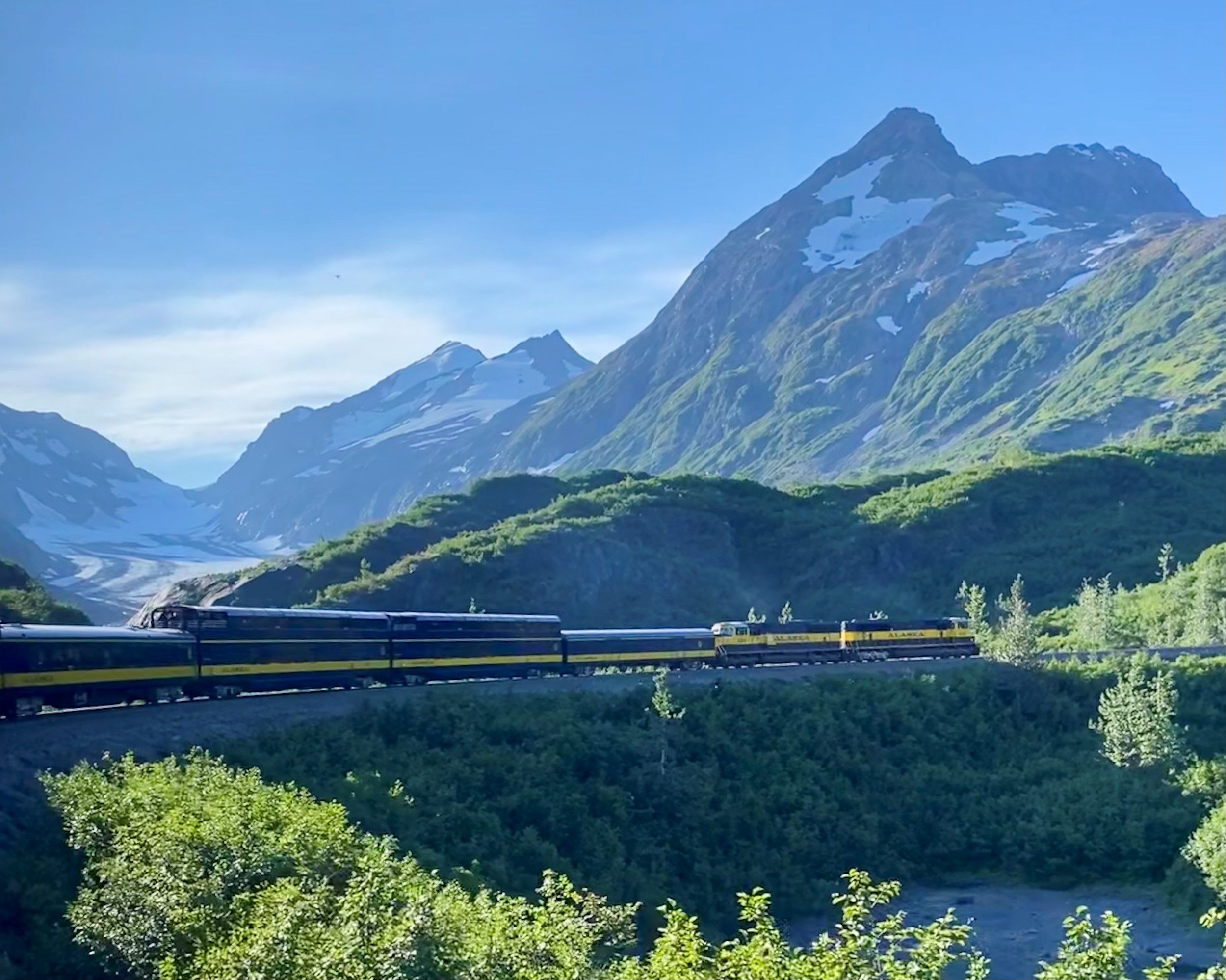
- The Coastal Classic winds its way through the "S Curves" as Bartlett Glacier towers in the distance

Overview
- Service type: Inter-city rail
- Status: Operating
- Current operator(s): Alaska Railroad

Route
- Termini: Anchorage; Seward
- Stops: 1
- Distance travelled: 114 miles (183 km)
- Average journey time: 4 hours, 15 minutes
- Service frequency: Daily each way (May through September)

On-board services
- Class(es): Adventure Class; GoldStar Service (luxury)
- Catering facilities: Café car; dining car (GoldStar Service and select Adventure Class trips)
- Observation facilities: Large windows in all cars; dome cars in Adventure Class; Ultra Dome cars with outdoor viewing deck for GoldStar Service
- Baggage facilities: Overhead racks; baggage car

Technical
- Track gauge: 4 ft 8 1/2 in (1,435 mm) standard gauge
- Operating speed: 26.8 mph (43.1 km/h) (average); 59 mph (95 km/h) (maximum)

The Coastal Classic is a passenger and semi-luxury train operated by the Alaska Railroad between the cities of Anchorage and Seward, Alaska. It is a seasonal train, only operating between the months of May and September. Despite its seasonality, the Coastal Classic was the Alaska Railroad's most popular route in 2019.

In 2020, summer services began in July in response to the COVID-19 pandemic.

== Station stops ==
The Coastal Classic makes the following station stops:

- Anchorage
- Girdwood
- Seward

Alaska Railroad route 1435mm gauge tracks, paved roads
