= Alaska SeaLife Center =

Aquarium in Seward, Alaska, United States

Alaska Sea Life Center
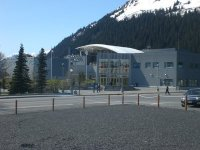
- Interactive map of Alaska Sea Life Center
- 60°06′00″N 149°26′27″W
- Date opened: May 20, 1998
- Location: Seward, Alaska
- Land area: 115,000 square feet (10,700 m^{2})
- Website: www.alaskasealife.org

The Alaska SeaLife Center is a public aquarium and Alaska's only permanent marine mammal rehabilitation facility. It is located on the shores of Resurrection Bay in Seward. It opened in May 1998, and is dedicated to understanding and maintaining the integrity of the marine ecosystem of Alaska through research, rehabilitation, conservation, and public education. It is the only facility in the world specifically dedicated to studying the northern marine environment and the only one designed at the outset to combine research with public education and visitor components. The Alaska SeaLife Center generates and shares scientific knowledge to promote understanding and stewardship of Alaska's marine ecosystems.

The Alaska SeaLife Center project cost $55 million; Exxon Valdez oil spill settlement funds made up the $37.5 million portion of funds dedicated to research and rehabilitation. An additional $12 million was raised by selling bonds, and $1.1 million was raised locally through private donations.

The Alaska SeaLife Center is a private, non-profit corporation with approximately 105 full-time employees and a staff of volunteers and interns.

In September 2011, the Alaska SeaLife Center was granted accreditation by the Association of Zoos and Aquariums. This acknowledgment places the ASLC in the top tier of their field as less than 5% of the nation's 6000 zoos and aquariums currently have this standard of certification.

== Research ==
The Alaska SeaLife Center is one of the only non-profit organizations in the world that has both a public aquarium and fully supported research facility in the same building. The SeaLife Center is affiliated with the University of Alaska Fairbanks and collaborates with numerous state, federal and international agencies and universities.

The SeaLife Center studies the marine ecosystems of Alaska and the species who call it home. This includes species of marine mammals, sea birds, fish and invertebrates—some of which have been listed as threatened or endangered species. The Alaska SeaLife Center specializes in marine mammal and sea bird research on species including Steller sea lions, eiders, harbor seals, sea otters, fur seals and other species experiencing population declines in Alaska. Research strives to develop cutting-edge technology and techniques, while minimizing impact on the species and environment being studied.

The Science Department currently includes dedicated programs for pinnipeds (seals and sea lions), eiders, sea otters, and salmon.

== Rehabilitation ==
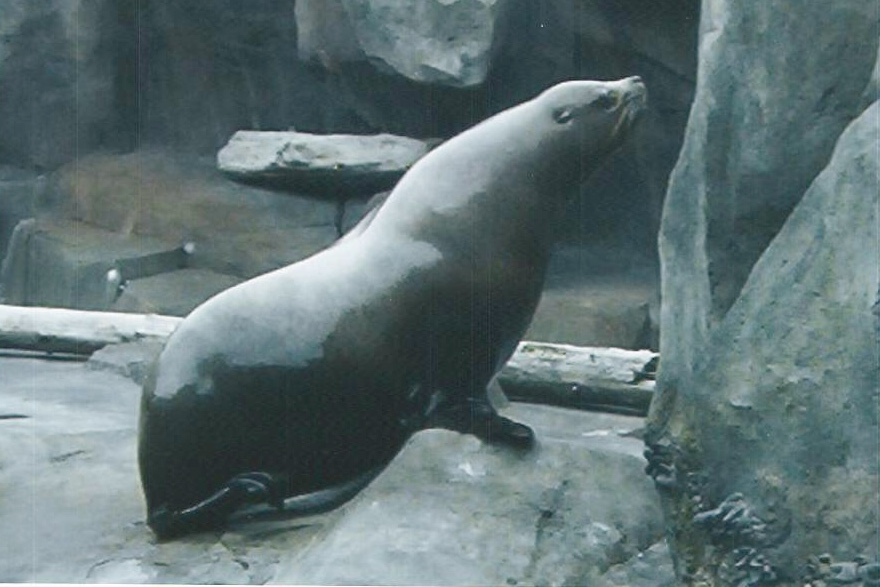
A sea lion hauled out in its enclosure at the SeaLife Center

The Alaska SeaLife Center provides care for sick and injured marine animals, yielding important information about wildlife populations. Through this program, the center rescues, treats, and releases stranded animals. It is the policy of the Alaska SeaLife Center to make every reasonable effort to rehabilitate and release as many rescued animals as possible. The main objective of the Rehabilitation Program is to return healthy rehabilitated animals back to their natural habitat. Stranded marine animals including harbor, ringed, spotted and fur seals, Steller and California sea lions, walruses, sea otters, and birds from all over Alaska are brought to the center for medical treatment, rehabilitation, and ideally, release. In cases where the animals cannot be released, they are kept at the Alaska SeaLife Center or transferred to another facility.

The Alaska SeaLife Center is the only permanent stranding facility for marine mammals in Alaska. Operating as a designated marine mammal "stranding center" within a marine research facility allows veterinarians and staff to learn a great deal about these animals during the rehabilitation process.

Rescued and rehabilitated animals provide the Alaska SeaLife Center with insight to their biology and physiology. This information adds to the pool of knowledge necessary to conserve threatened and endangered species. This program also assists with monitoring the status of wild populations through the scientific study of ill or orphaned marine mammals and birds. Through communication and education programs, public knowledge of the marine environment and public awareness of its importance to our ecosystem is increased.

The Rescue and Rehabilitation Program is authorized by NMFS (National Marine Fisheries Service) and USFWS (U.S. Fish and Wildlife Service) to respond to marine mammal and bird strandings from the entire gulf coast of Alaska. The program includes a veterinary staff, interns, and volunteers trained to respond and care for marine mammals and birds.

== Education ==
The Discovery Education programs are developed in accordance with Alaska's Science Content and Performance Standards and the National Science Education Standards. Programs are offered year-round at the SeaLife Center in the form of Day Programs and overnight Nocturne Sleepovers. Outreach Programs can be presented in schools in the Anchorage, Mat-Su, and Kenai Peninsula areas. Distance Learning programs can be presented worldwide to locations with interactive video conference equipment.

== Exhibits ==
The center's public exhibits include a touch tank where visitors can touch small marine invertebrates such as sea stars and sea urchins in a shallow pool, an aviary for the center's numerous seabirds with a two-story diving pool, also housing a wolf eel and several species of large saltwater fish. Other tanks and exhibits include harbor seals, Steller's sea lions, various nutibranches, moon jellyfish, gruntsculpins, and Giant Pacific octopuses. There are also exhibits of Alaska's most important food fish such as salmon, halibut, king crab, and sablefish. In 2016, the Center opened the Nose 2 Nose exhibit, which enhances the underwater viewing area with a new Octopus Grotto where visitors can learn more about resident octopuses. The exhibit also offers an array of interpretive installations and fun activities for the entire family, in addition to seeing eye-to-eye with octopuses, sea lions, seals, and a number of fish and bird species.
