= Alaskan Engineering Commission =

Former American federal agency

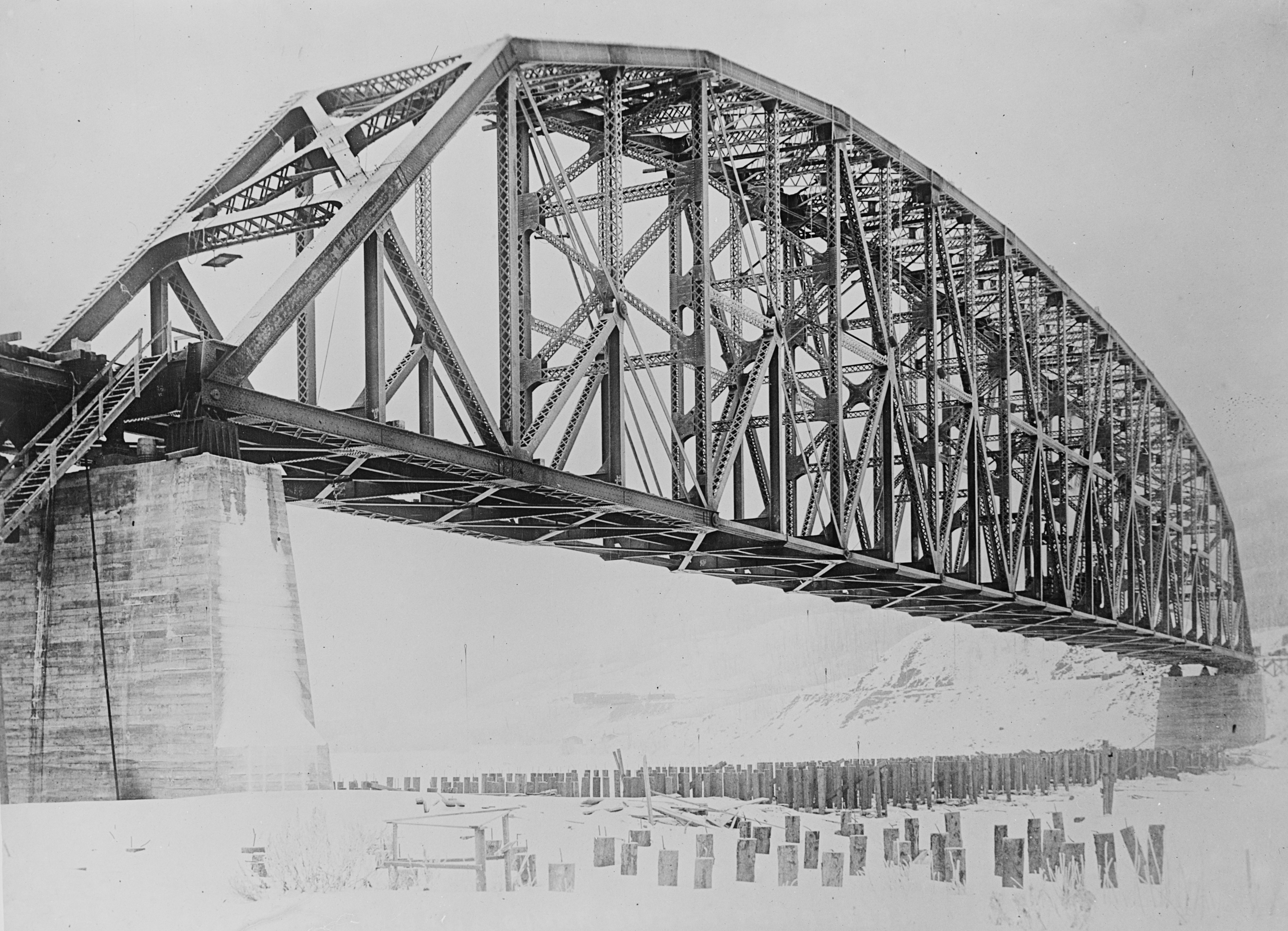
Mears Memorial Bridge

The Alaskan Engineering Commission (AEC) was a U.S. Federal agency, sometimes known by its initials or by alternate spelling Alaska Engineering Commission. It was created by the Alaska Railroad Act in 1914 by U.S. President Woodrow Wilson in order to arrange for the construction of a railway system in Alaska. William C. Edes was named chairman, chief engineer Colonel Frederick Mears. In 1915, the AEC became part of the U.S. Department of the Interior. In 1923, after the railroad began operation and construction was complete, it became the Alaska Railroad Commission, later renamed to The Alaska Railroad.

Among other accomplishments, it designed and/or built a number of works listed on the U.S. National Register of Historic Places.

Works include:

- Mears Memorial Bridge, built in 1923
- Alaska Engineering Commission Cottage No. 23, 618 Christensen Dr. Anchorage, Alaska, NRHP-listed
- Alaska Engineering Commission Cottage No. 25, 645 W. Third Ave., Anchorage, AK, NRHP-listed
- Pioneer School House, 3rd Ave. and Eagle St., Anchorage, AK, NRHP-listed
- Seward Depot, 501 Railway Ave. Seward, Alaska, NRHP-listed
- Wasilla Depot, Parks Highway and Knik Rd. Wasilla, Alaska, NRHP-listed
- Whitney Section House, 3400 W. Neuser Dr., Wasilla, AK, NRHP-listed
