= Anchorage Depot =

Anchorage
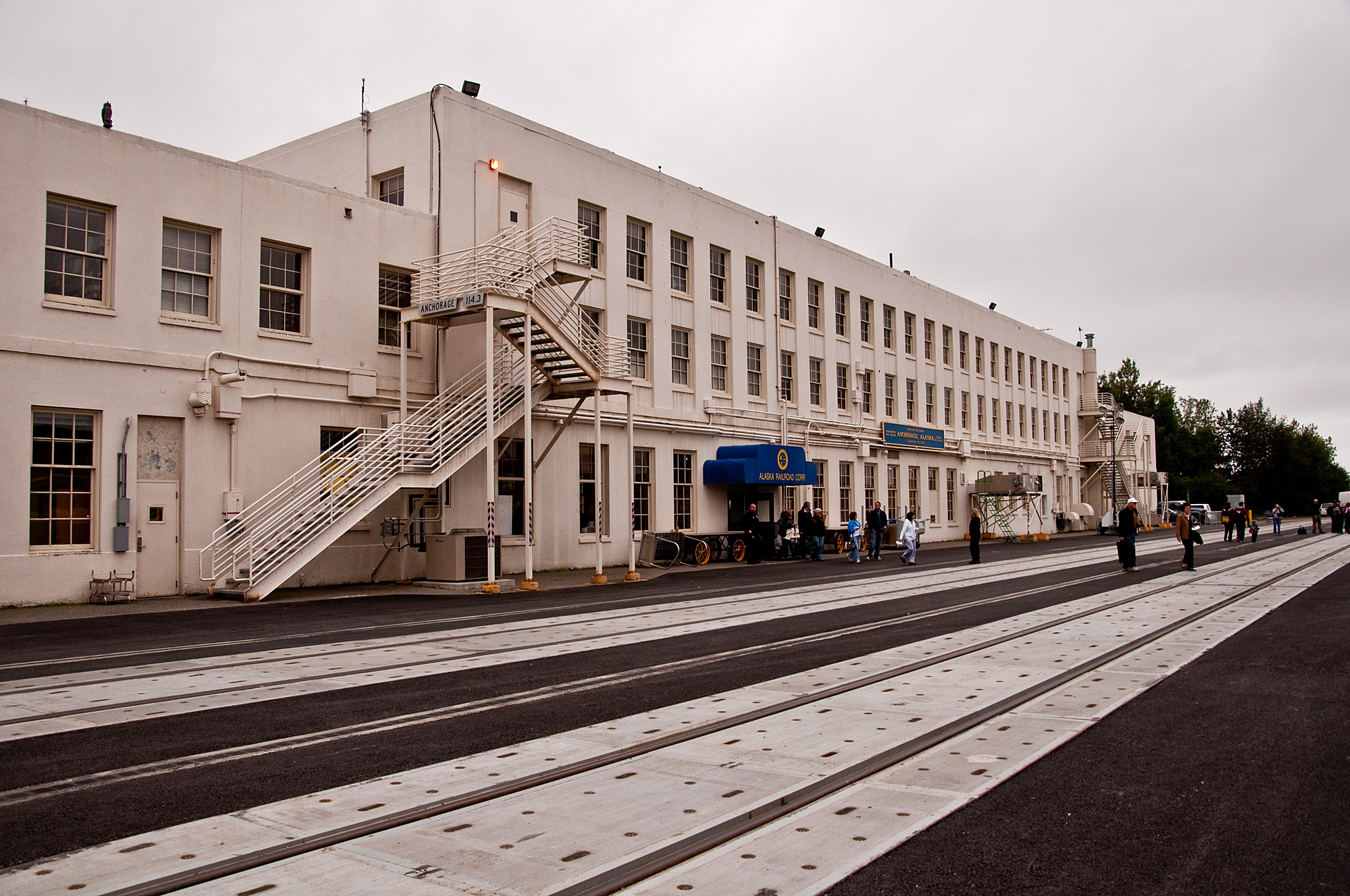

General information
- Location: 411 West 1st Avenue; Anchorage, Alaska 99501; United States
- Owner: Alaska Railroad
- Platforms: 1 side platform 1 Island
- Tracks: 4

Construction
- Architect: Joseph L. Skoog

History
- Opened: 1942
- Rebuilt: 1948

Services
Preceding station	Alaska Railroad	Following station
Terminus	Aurora Winter Train	Wasilla toward Fairbanks
Terminus	Denali Star	Wasilla toward Fairbanks
Terminus	Coastal Classic	Girdwood toward Seward
Terminus	Glacier Discovery	Girdwood toward Grandview
Terminus	Hurricane Turn (Winter service)	Wasilla toward Hurricane Gulch
- Anchorage Depot
- U.S. National Register of Historic Places
- Alaska Heritage Resources Survey
- Location: Anchorage, Alaska
- Coordinates: 61°13′18″N 149°53′26″W
- Area: less than one acre
- Built: 1942
- Built by: Alaska Railroad, J.B. Warrack Company
- Architect: Joseph L. Skoog
- NRHP reference No.: 99001027
- AHRS No.: ANC-00362
- Added to NRHP: August 27, 1999
Location

Anchorage Depot, also known as Alaska Railroad Depot, is the railroad station at the center of the Alaska Railroad system at the junction of the two main lines their trains run on. It serves as the starting point for many tourists traveling on the luxury trains such as the Denali Star. The station is a Moderne-style three story concrete building, built in 1942 and enlarged in 1948.

It is located at the base of a hill, below downtown Anchorage. It measures 338 feet (103 m) by 45 feet (14 m).

In 1999, it was deemed significant in the history of transportation in Alaska and nominated for listing on the National Register of Historic Places. The depot, built of concrete and steel and well-equipped, was held to represent the railroad's transition from wooden structures and equipment inadequate for challenges of the World War II era and since.

It was placed on the National Register of Historic Places on August 27, 1999.

It appears that sometime before October 2020, a high platform was built on the third track over from the main depot, thus making this the first train station in Alaska to have a high platform.

== See also ==
- National Register of Historic Places listings in Anchorage, Alaska
