= Fairbanks Depot =

Fairbanks
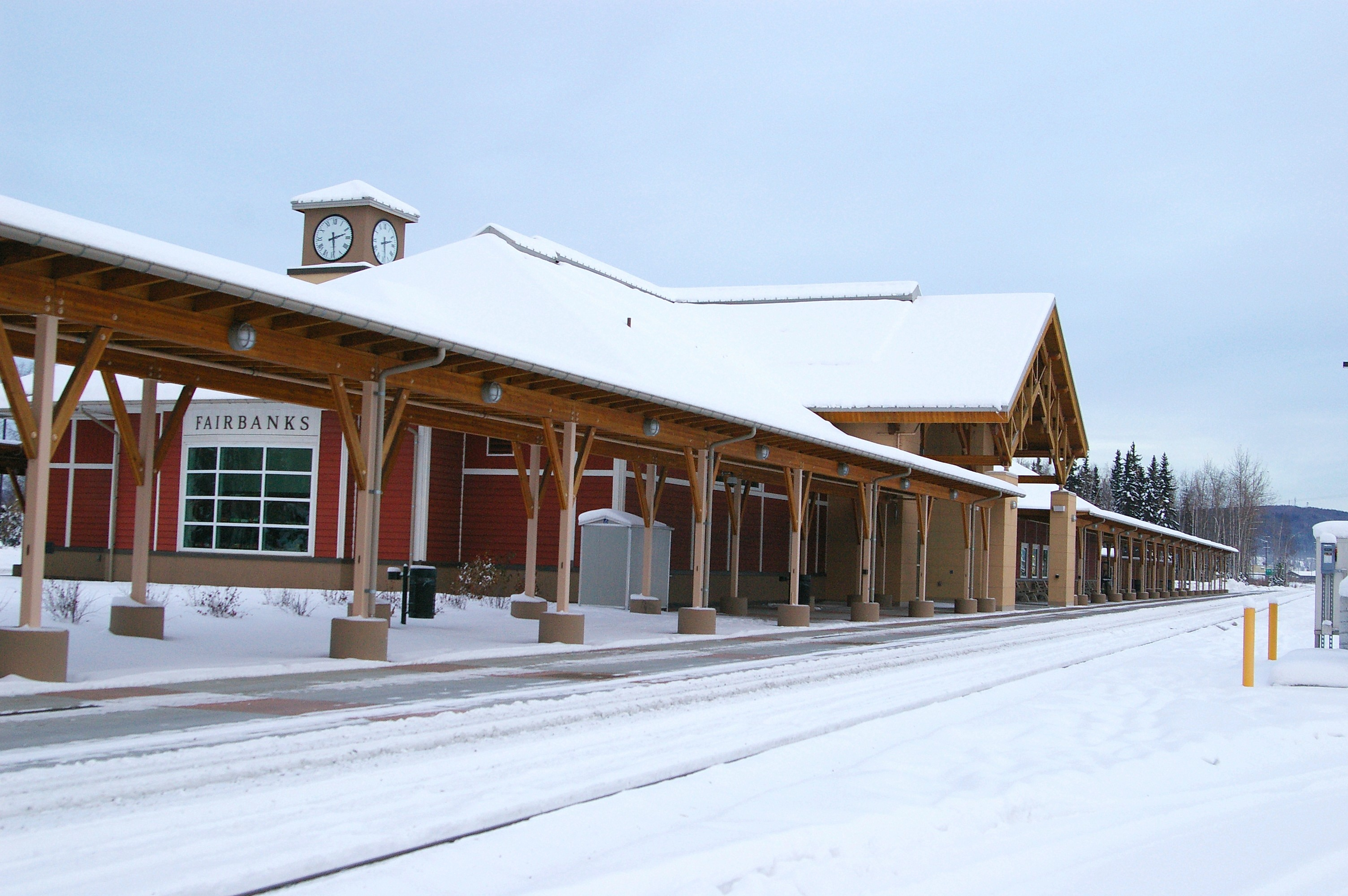
- Fairbanks Depot seen in December 2008

General information
- Location: 1745 Johansen Expressway; Fairbanks, AK 99701
- Coordinates: 64.8513°N 147.7409°W
- Owner: Alaska Railroad
- Platforms: 1 side platform
- Tracks: 3

History
- Opened: 1905
- Rebuilt: 1923; 1960
- Original company: Tanana Mines Railway

Services
Preceding station	Alaska Railroad	Following station
Nenana toward Anchorage	Denali Star	Terminus
Nenana toward Anchorage	Aurora Winter Train	Terminus
Location

Fairbanks Depot is a freight and passenger railroad station in Fairbanks, Alaska. The station is the northern terminus for Alaska Railroad's Denali Star and Aurora Winter Train routes.

== History ==
The Tanana Mines Railway reached Fairbanks on July 17, 1905 with a golden spike ceremony. A new station building was constructed in 1923, following a visit to the area by President Warren G. Harding. That structure was, itself, demolished and replaced by a new building in 1960. A total of four station buildings have served as the Fairbanks Depot.
