= Hurricane Turn =

Train line operated by Alaska Railroad

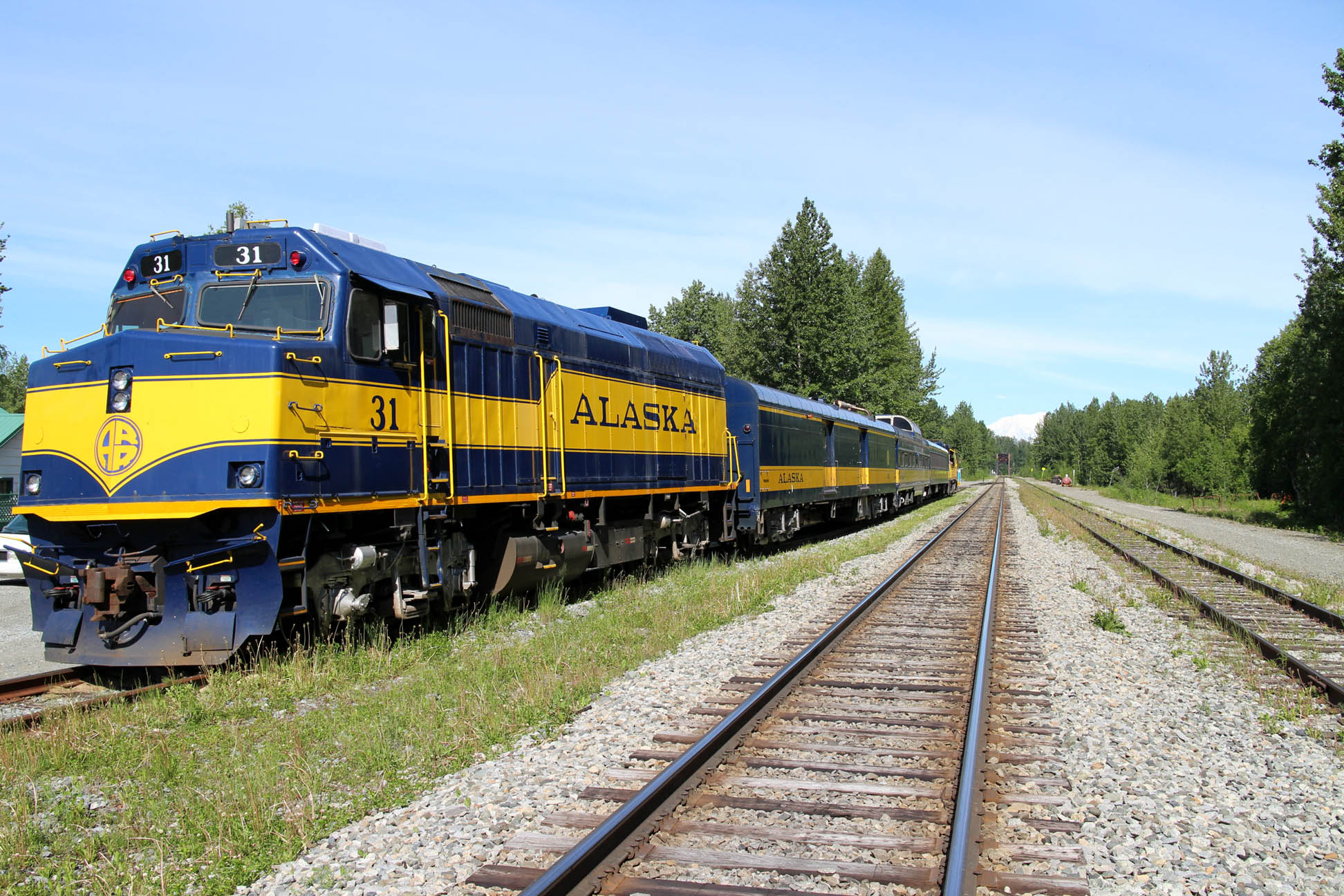
- Hurricane Turn in Talkeetna, AK, June 2015

Overview
- Service type: Flag stop
- Status: Operating
- Locale: Matanuska-Susitna Borough, Alaska, USA
- Current operator: Alaska Railroad

Route
- Termini: Talkeetna; Hurricane Gulch
- Distance travelled: 57.6 mi (92.7 km)
- Average journey time: 2 hours 30 minutes each way 5 hours 45 minutes round trip
- Service frequency: Monthly (October through April); Thursday through Sunday (May through September)

On-board services
- Seating arrangements: Coach
- Catering facilities: None

Technical
- Track gauge: 4 ft 8 1/2 in (1,435 mm) standard gauge
- Operating speed: 59 mph (95 km/h)
- Track owner: Alaska Railroad

The Hurricane, or Hurricane Turn, is a passenger train operated by the Alaska Railroad between Talkeetna and Hurricane Gulch in Alaska. This train is unique in that rather than making scheduled station stops, it is a flag stop train meaning that passengers between Talkeetna and Hurricane can wave a white cloth anywhere along the route and the train will stop to pick them up. The train runs daily Thursday through Sunday between the months of May and September and the first Thursday of every month the rest of the year (between Hurricane Gulch and Anchorage). The Hurricane Turn is one of the last true flag-stop trains in the United States.

By 2009, the Budd Rail Diesel Cars were removed from service on the Hurricane Turn. Current configuration is two passenger cars and one baggage car with a powered locomotive on one end and a non-powered cab car on the other. This gives a control cab on both ends so the train can be operated safely in both directions and doesn't need to be turned around at Hurricane Gulch. In 2020, summer services began in July in response to the COVID-19 pandemic.

Alaska Railroad route
