= Alaska Railroad =

Alaskan Class II railroad system

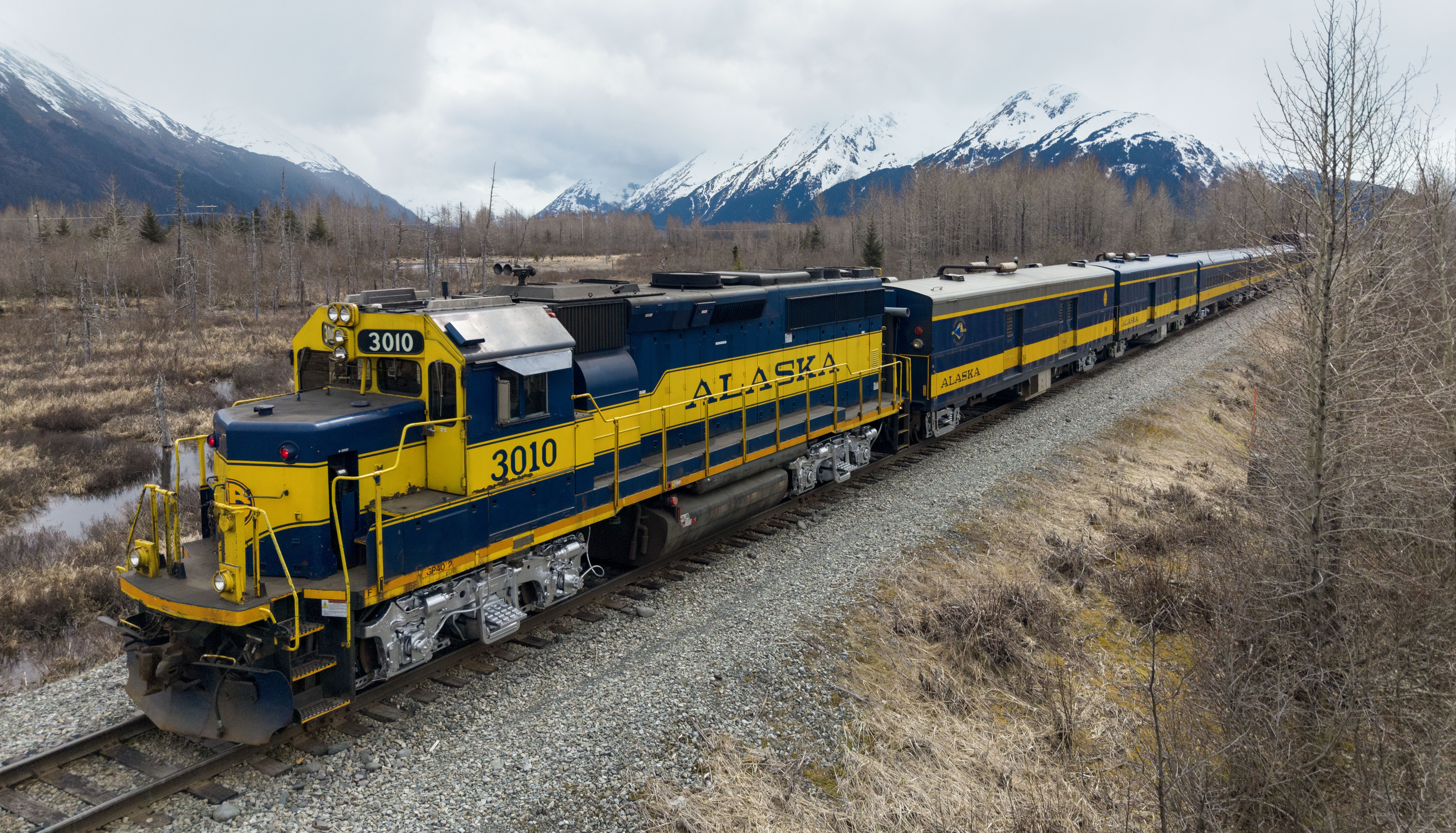
- An Alaska Railroad passenger train at Portage Depot

Overview
- Owner: State of Alaska
- Locale: Alaska
- Website: alaskarailroad.com

Service
- Type: Freight and passenger railroad
- Services: 5
- Daily ridership: 900 (weekdays, Q2 2026)
- Ridership: 227,600 (2025)

History
- Work began: 1903
- Purchase by US Government: March 12, 1914
- Completed: July 15, 1923
- Transfer to state: January 6, 1985

Technical
- Line length: 470 miles (760 km) (mainline)
- Track length: 656 miles (1,056 km)
- Track gauge: 4 ft 8 1/2 in (1,435 mm) standard gauge
- Old gauge: 3 ft (914 mm) (former Tanana Valley Railroad)
- Signalling: Centralized traffic control or track warrant control with positive train control

The Alaska Railroad (reporting mark ARR) is a Class II railroad that operates freight and passenger trains in the state of Alaska. The railroad's mainline runs between Seward on the southern coast and Fairbanks, near the center of the state. It passes through Anchorage and Denali National Park, to which 17% of visitors travel by train.

The railroad has 656 miles (1,056 km) of track, including sidings, rail yards and branch lines. The main line between Seward and Fairbanks is over 470 miles (760 km) long. The branch to Whittier conveys freight railcars interchanged with the contiguous United States via rail barges sailing between the Port of Whittier and Harbor Island in Seattle.

Construction of the railroad started in 1903 when the Alaska Central Railroad built a line starting in Seward and extending 50 miles (80 km) north. The Alaska Central went bankrupt in 1907 and was reorganized as the Alaska Northern Railroad Company in 1911, which extended the line another 21 miles (34 km) northward. On March 12, 1914, the U.S. Congress agreed to fund construction and operation of an all-weather railroad from Seward to Fairbanks and purchased the rail line from the financially struggling Alaska Northern.

As the government started building the estimated $35 million railroad, it opened a construction town along Ship Creek, eventually giving rise to Anchorage, now the state's largest city. In 1917, the government purchased the narrow gauge Tanana Valley Railroad, mostly for its railyard in Fairbanks. The railroad was completed on July 15, 1923, with President Warren G. Harding traveling to Alaska to drive a ceremonial golden spike at Nenana. Ownership of the railroad passed from the federal government to the state of Alaska on January 6, 1985. The state paid the United States the fair market value of the railroad.

In 2025, the system had a ridership of 227,600, or about 900 per weekday as of the second quarter of 2026. In 2019, the company generated a US$21.6 million profit on revenues of US$203.9 million, holding US$1.1 billion in total assets.

== History ==
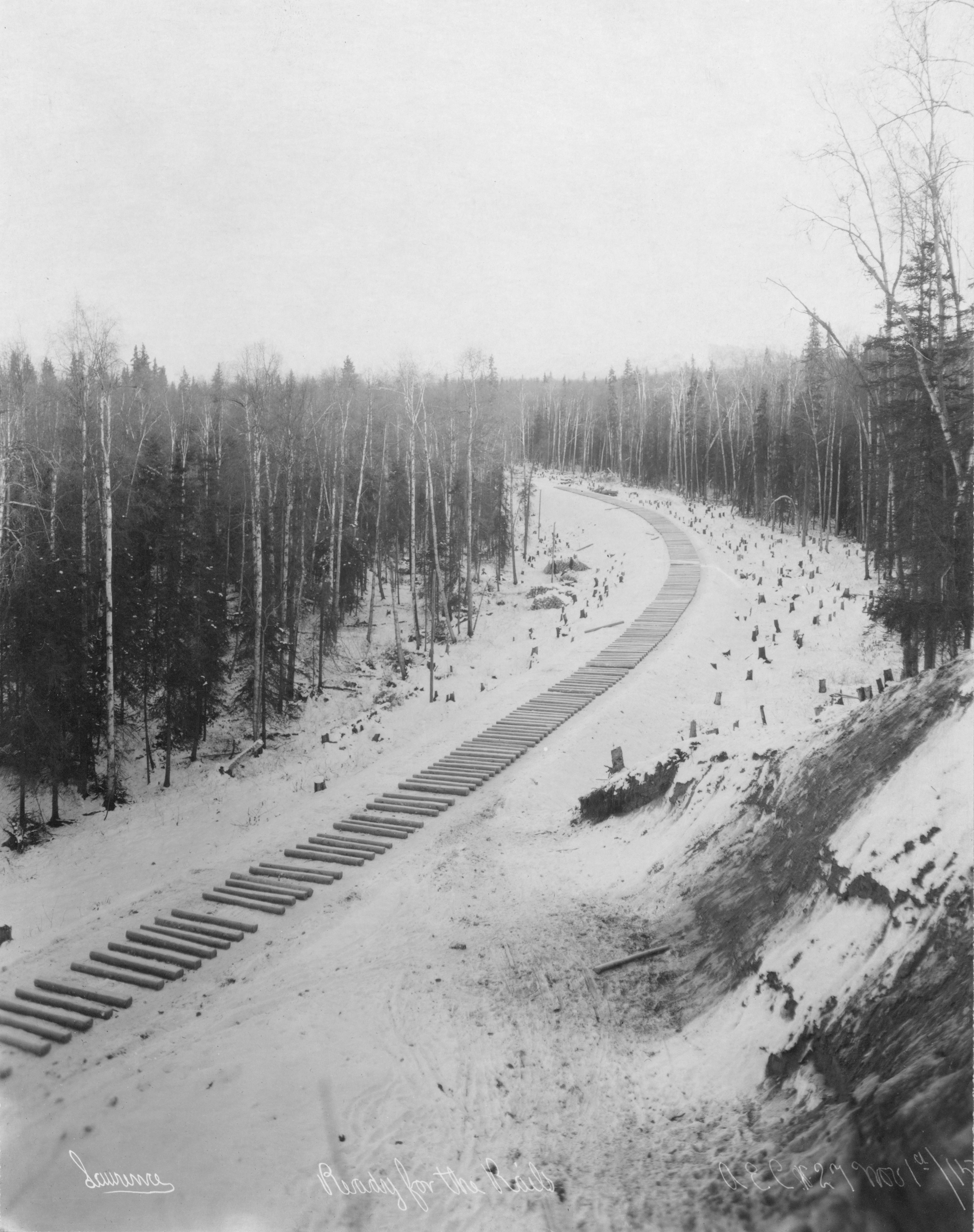
A 1915 photograph of the railroad under construction

In 1903 a company called the Alaska Central Railroad began to build a rail line beginning at Seward, on the Kenai Peninsula in Alaska, northward. The company built 51 miles (82 km) of track by 1909 and went into receivership. This route carried passengers, freight and mail to the upper Turnagain Arm. From there, goods were taken by boat at high tide, and by dog team or pack train to Eklutna and the Matanuska-Susitna Valley.

In 1909, another company, the Alaska Northern Railroad Company, bought the rail line and extended it another 21 miles (34 km) northward. From the new end, goods were floated down the Turnagain Arm in small boats. The Alaska Northern Railroad went into receivership in 1914.

At about this time, the United States government was planning a railroad route from Seward to the interior town of Fairbanks. President William Howard Taft authorized a commission to survey a route in 1912. The line would be 656 miles (1,056 km) long and provide an all-weather route to the interior.

In 1914, the government bought the Alaska Northern Railroad and moved its headquarters to Ship Creek, in what would later become Anchorage. The government began to extend the rail line northward.

In 1917, the Tanana Valley Railroad in Fairbanks was heading into bankruptcy. It owned a small 45-mile (72 km) 3 ft (914 mm) (narrow gauge) line that serviced the towns of Fairbanks and the mining communities in the area as well as the boat docks on the Tanana River near Fairbanks.

The government bought the Tanana Valley Railroad, principally for its terminal facilities. The section between Fairbanks and Happy was converted to dual gauge to complete the 4 ft 8 1/2 in (1,435 mm) standard gauge line from Seward to Fairbanks. The government extended the southern portion of the track to Nenana, and later converted the extension to standard gauge. The Alaska Railroad continued to operate the remaining TVRR narrow gauge line as the Chatanika Branch (the terminus was near the Yukon River), until decommissioning it in 1930.

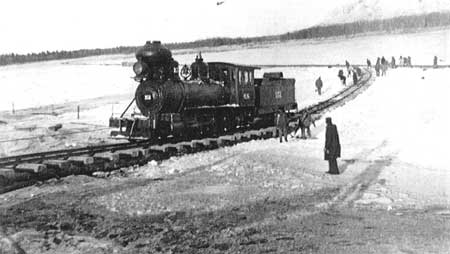
An Alaska Railroad steam locomotive crossing the Tanana River on the ice at Nenana just prior to completion of the railroad in 1923

In 1923 they built the 700-foot (213 m) Mears Memorial Bridge across the Tanana River at Nenana. This was the final link in the Alaska Railroad and at the time, was the second longest single-span steel railroad bridge in the country. U.S. President Warren G. Harding, visiting Alaska as part of his Voyage of Understanding, drove the golden spike that completed the railroad on July 15, 1923, on the north side of the bridge. The railroad was part of the US Department of the Interior.

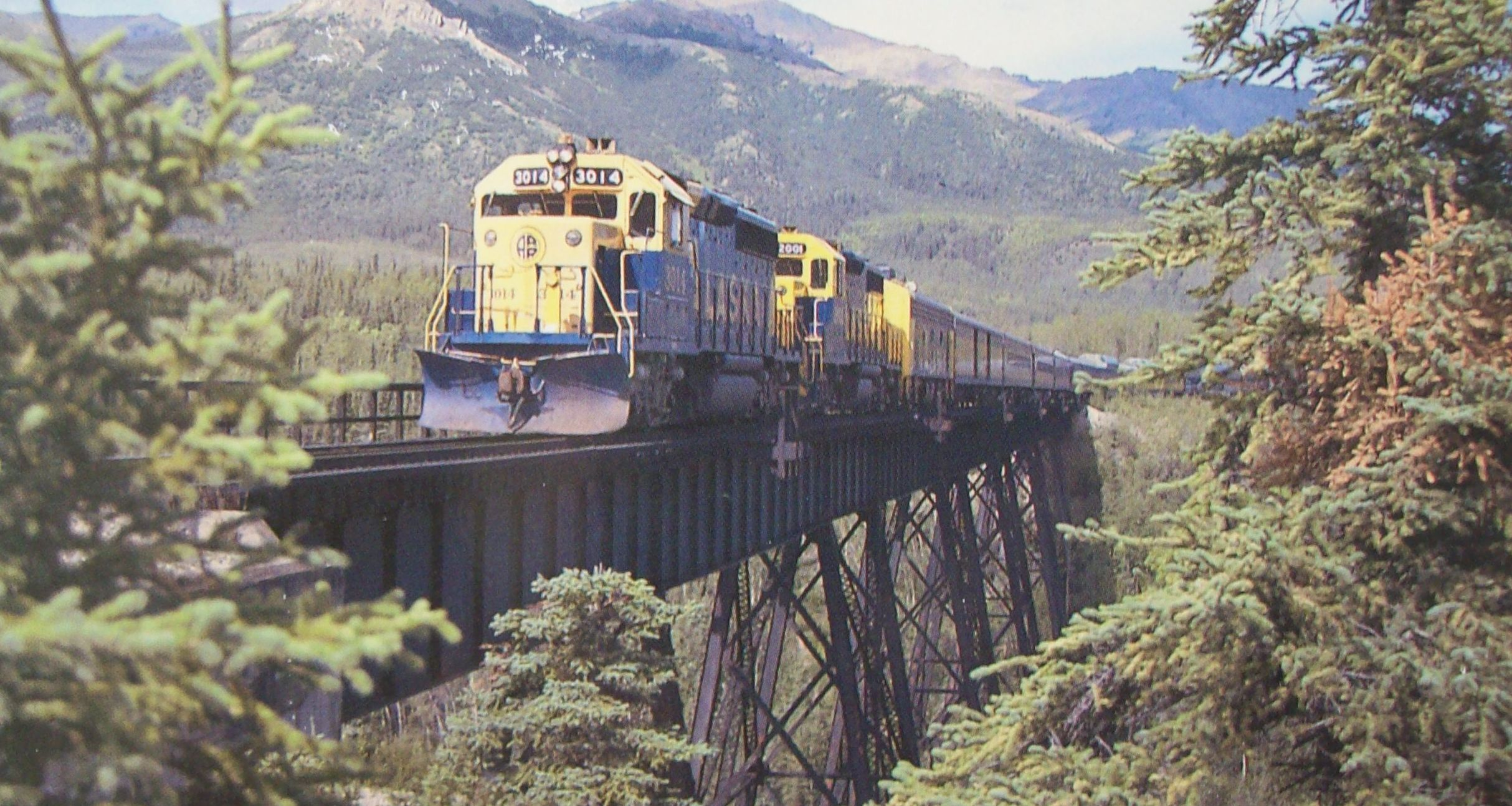
An Alaska Railroad passenger train rolling between Anchorage, Denali National Park and Fairbanks

The Alaska Railroad's first diesel locomotive entered service in 1944. The railroad retired its last steam locomotive in 1966.

In 1958, land for the future Clear Air Force Station was purchased. (Clear is about 15 kilometers (9.3 mi) south of Nenana.) Approximately 40,000 feet (12 km) of track were diverted, and later a spur was constructed to deliver coal to its power station.

The railroad was greatly affected by the Good Friday earthquake, which struck southern Alaska in 1964. The yard and trackage around Seward buckled and the trackage along Turnagain Arm was damaged by floodwaters and landslides. It took several months to restore full service along the line.

In 1967, the railroad was transferred to the Federal Railroad Administration, an agency within the newly created United States Department of Transportation.

In 1975–76, an infusion of $15 million from the DOT enabled various capital improvements including those to facilitate hauling materials for the Alaska Pipeline.

On January 6, 1985, the state of Alaska bought the railroad from the U.S. government for $22.3 million, based on a valuation determined by the US Railway Association. The state immediately invested over $70 million on improvements and repairs that compensated for years of deferred maintenance. The purchase agreement prohibits the Alaska Railroad from paying dividends or otherwise returning capital to the state of Alaska, unlike the state's other quasi-corporations: the Alaska Permanent Fund, the Alaska Housing Finance Corporation, and the Alaska Industrial Development and Export Authority.

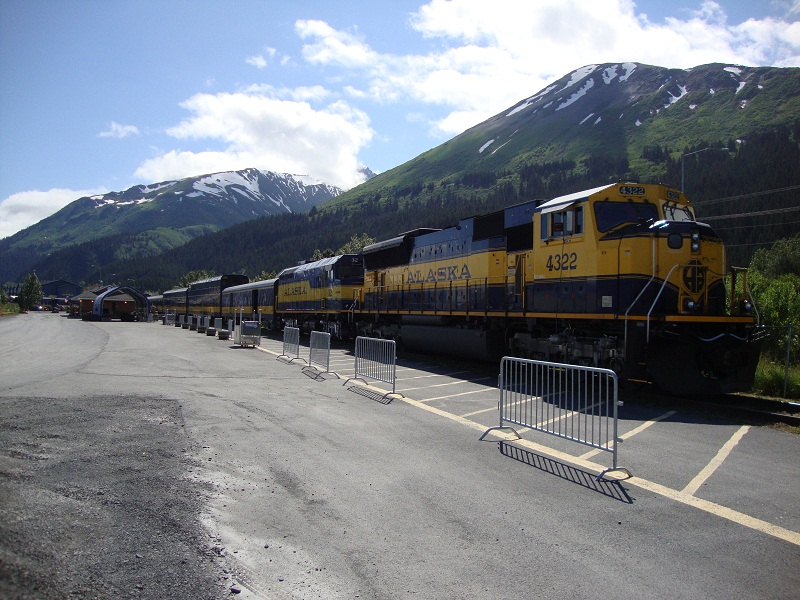
A northbound Alaska Railroad passenger train idles at the Seward, Alaska, depot on June 30, 2010

== Proposed expansion in Alaska ==
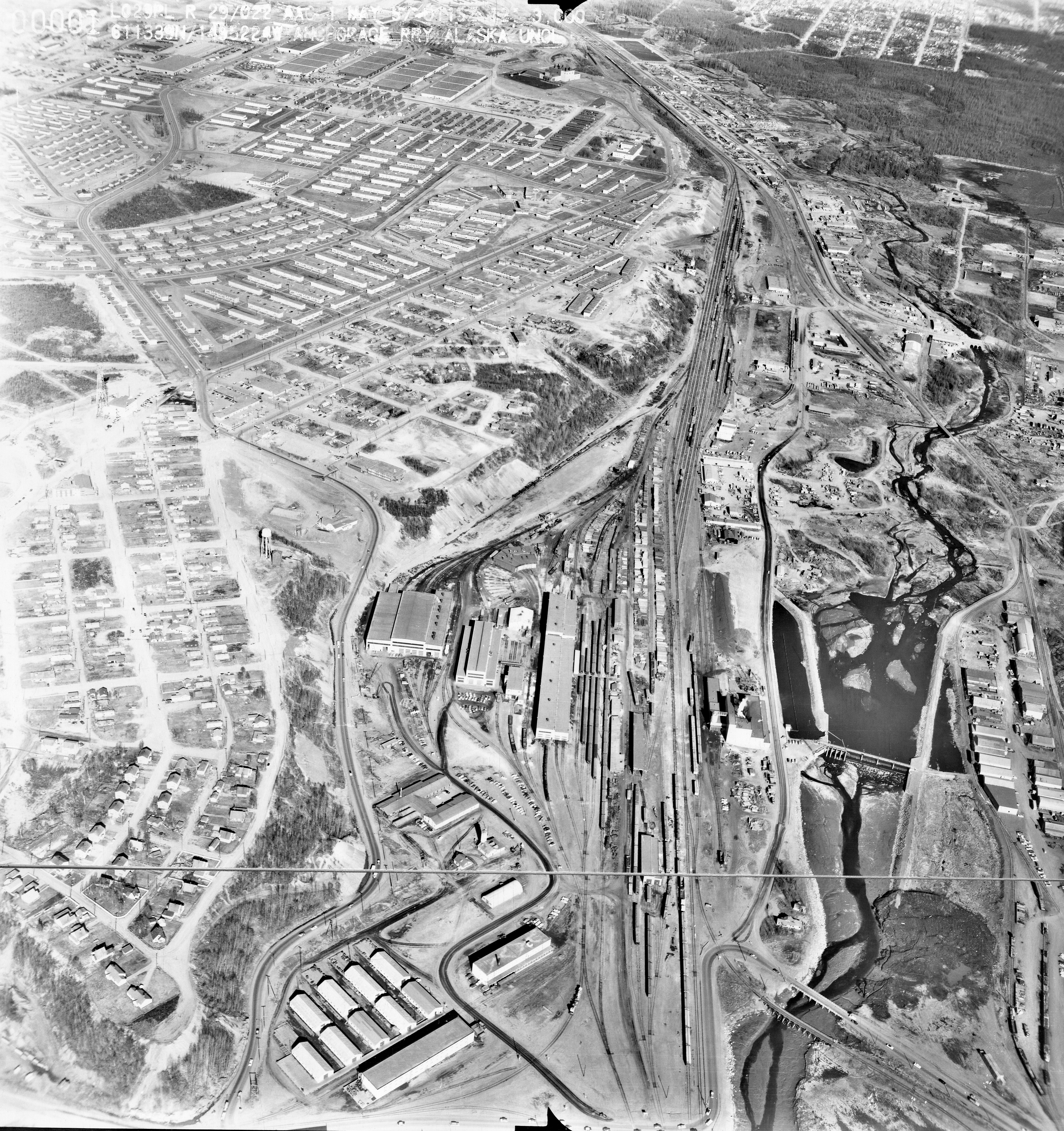
Anchorage Yard, ca. 1940s

=== Northern Rail Extension to Delta Junction ===
An extension of the railroad from Fairbanks to Delta Junction over a bridge spanning the Tanana River was envisioned as early as 2009. The 2011 Alaska state budget would provide $40 million in funding for the bridge, which initially be only for vehicular use. The United States Department of Defense would provide another $100 million in funds, as the bridge and a subsequent rail line would provide year-round access to Fort Greely and the Joint Tanana Training Complex. Groundbreaking ceremony for the Tanana River Bridge took place on September 28, 2011, and the new bridge was opened (for military road traffic only) in 2014.

=== Point MacKenzie Line ===
On 21 November 2011, the Surface Transportation Board approved the construction of a new 25-mile (40 km) line between Port MacKenzie and the existing main line at Houston, Alaska. As of May 2023 this spur line had not been completed.

=== Anchorage vicinity service ===
A spur line was built to Ted Stevens International Airport in 2003, along with a depot, officially named after Bill Sheffield. The line never received scheduled service but cruise lines charter trains to convey passengers between ships and the airport. The railroad currently leases the depot to citizens for private events such as conferences, seminars, and corporate functions.

There are plans to provide commuter rail service within the Anchorage metropolitan area (Anchorage to Mat-Su Valley via Eagle River, north Anchorage to south Anchorage); additional tracks would be necessary to accommodate the heavy freight traffic.

=== Proposed connection to the contiguous 48 states ===
In 2001 federal legislation, sponsored by Republican U.S. senator (and later Alaska governor) Frank Murkowski, formed a bilateral commission to study feasibility of building a rail link between Canada and Alaska; Canada was asked to be part of the commission, but the Canadian federal government did not choose to join the commission or commit funds for the study. However, the Yukon territorial government did show some interest.

A June 2006 report by the commission recommended Carmacks, Yukon, as a hub, with three possibilities: A line could go northward to Delta Junction, Alaska (Alaska Railroad's northern end-of-track). Another line could go from Carmacks to Hazelton, British Columbia (which is served by the CN), passing through Watson Lake, Yukon, and Dease Lake, British Columbia. The third line could go from Carmacks to either Haines or Skagway, Alaska. The latter path by way of Whitehorse, Yukon, the northern terminus of the 3 ft (914 mm) (narrow-gauge) White Pass and Yukon Route Railroad). However, currently the latter's trains only reach Carcross, Yukon, because service has not been completely restored following a 1982 embargo of the entire line.

Following the demise of the ill-fated Keystone XL Pipeline project, the Alaska Canada Rail Link (ACRL) was rekindled as an alternative. In November 2015, the National Post reported that a link between the southern provinces and the Alaska Railroad was again being considered by the Canadian federal government, this time routing to Alberta. In this scenario, the route would originate at Delta Junction and use Carmacks as a hub, as in prior plans. The route would continue through Watson Lake, Yukon, en route to a stop at Fort Nelson, British Columbia. It would continue to Peace River, Alberta, with its southern terminus at Fort McMurray. The route was endorsed by the Assembly of First Nations. It was unclear whether this rail connection would ever be utilized for passenger service.

On September 25, 2020, President Donald Trump announced he would issue a presidential permit to the Alaska-Alberta Railway Development Corporation (A2A Railway), which had an agreement with Alaska Railway to develop a joint operating plan for the rail connection to Canada. The proposed A2A Railway would have connected to the Alaska Railroad at North Pole, Alaska, and run through Yukon Territory to Fort Nelson, and from there to a terminus at Fort McMurray, Alberta. (The A2A Railway had also been negotiating with the Mat-Su Borough on an agreement to complete the Port Mackenzie Railway Extension.)

== Railroad Corporation Police ==
The Alaska Railroad Corporation has its own police force.

== Routes and tourism ==
Alaska Railroad route

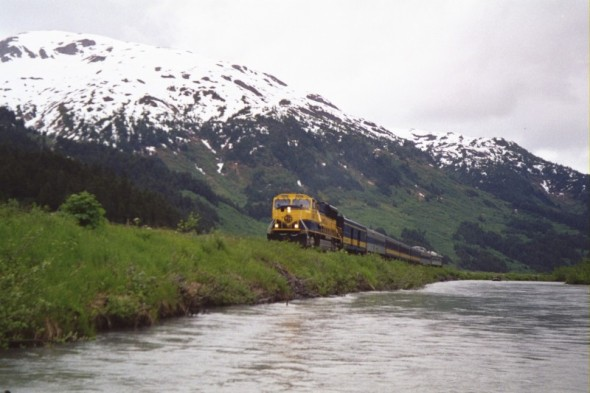
The Alaska Railroad's "Glacier Discovery" train

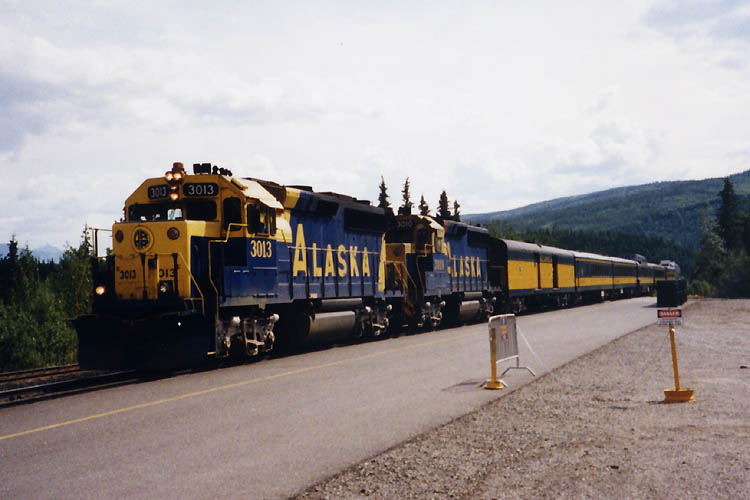
A passenger train pulls into the Denali Station in July 1998.

The railroad is a major tourist attraction in the summer. Coach cars feature wide windows and domes. Private cars owned by the major cruise companies are towed behind the Alaska Railroad's own cars, and trips are included with various cruise packages.

=== Routes ===
- The Denali Star runs from Anchorage to Fairbanks (approximately 12 hours one-way) and back with stops in Talkeetna and Denali National Park, from which various flight and bus tours are available. The Denali Star only operates between May 15 and September 15. Although the trip is only about 356 miles (573 km), it takes 12 hours to travel from Anchorage to Fairbanks as the tracks wind through mountains and valleys; the train's top speed is 59 miles per hour (95 km/h) but sometimes hovers closer to 30 miles per hour (48 km/h).
- The Aurora Winter Train is available in winter months (September 15 - May 15) on a reduced weekend-only schedule (Northbound, Saturday mornings; Southbound, Sunday mornings) between Anchorage and Fairbanks on the same route as the Denali Star.
- The Coastal Classic winds its way south from Anchorage along Turnagain Arm before turning south to the Kenai Peninsula, eventually reaching Seward. This 114-mile (183 km) trip takes around four and a half hours due to some slow trackage as the line winds its way over mountains.
- The Glacier Discovery provides a short (2-hour) trip south from Anchorage to Whittier for a brief stop before reversing direction for a stop at Grandview while returning to Anchorage in the evening.
- The Hurricane Turn provides rail service to people living between Talkeetna and the Hurricane area. This area has no roads, and the railroad provides the lifeline for residents who depend on the service to obtain food and supplies. One of the last flag-stop railway routes in the United States, passengers can board the Hurricane Turn anywhere along the route by waving a large white flag or cloth.
- The Grandview Cruise Train is a set of single-level passenger dome cars that Alaska Railroad makes available for charter to cruise line operators for the transportation of their passengers exclusively, typically between May 15 and September 15. On alternate Mondays this train operates under charter to NCL Holdings between Anchorage International Airport and the Whittier NCL Depot, where it meets Norwegian Cruise Line vessels. On Thursdays and Fridays this train operates under charter to Royal Caribbean Group between Anchorage International Airport and the Dale R. Lindsey Alaska Railroad Intermodal Terminal in Seward, where it meets Royal Caribbean International, Celebrity Cruises, and Silversea Cruises vessels. On Sundays this train operates under charter to HAP Alaska-Yukon between Anchorage Depot and the Whittier HAP Depot, where it meets Holland America Line vessels. On Saturdays and alternate Wednesdays this train operates under charter to HAP Alaska-Yukon between McKinley station, located 3.4 miles south of Talkeetna, and the Whittier HAP Depot, where it meets Princess Cruises vessels; this operation is known as the McKinley Express.
- The Denali Express uses a set of bilevel passenger dome cars that are owned by Tour Alaska, a subsidiary of Carnival, and a single bilevel passenger dome car that is owned by Alaska Railroad, with all cars operated under contract by Alaska Railroad. This train operates Saturdays, Sundays, and alternate Wednesdays exclusively for Holland America Line and Princess Cruises passengers. The train operates between Denali Park Depot and Whittier HAP Depot, where it meets Holland America Line and Princess Cruises vessels.
- The McKinley Explorer uses a set of bilevel passenger dome cars that are owned by Tour Alaska, a subsidiary of Carnival, operated under contract by Alaska Railroad. This train operates daily and is available to all persons, whether a cruise line passenger or not. The train operates between Denali Park Depot and Anchorage Depot.
- The Wilderness Express uses a bilevel passenger dome car that is owned by Premier Alaska Tours, and which is attached to the Denali Star train and operated by Alaska Railroad. This service operates daily and is available to all persons, whether a cruise line passenger or not. While the Wilderness Express is part of the same consist as the Denali Star, there is no passage between this car and the Denali Star cars. The train operates between Fairbanks Depot and Anchorage Depot.
- Note that the spur affording access to the Ted Stevens Anchorage International Airport is used during the summer season for cruise ship service only. It was activated temporarily during the Alaska Federation of Natives (AFN) 2006 convention to provide airport-to-hotel mass transit for delegates.

== Rolling stock ==
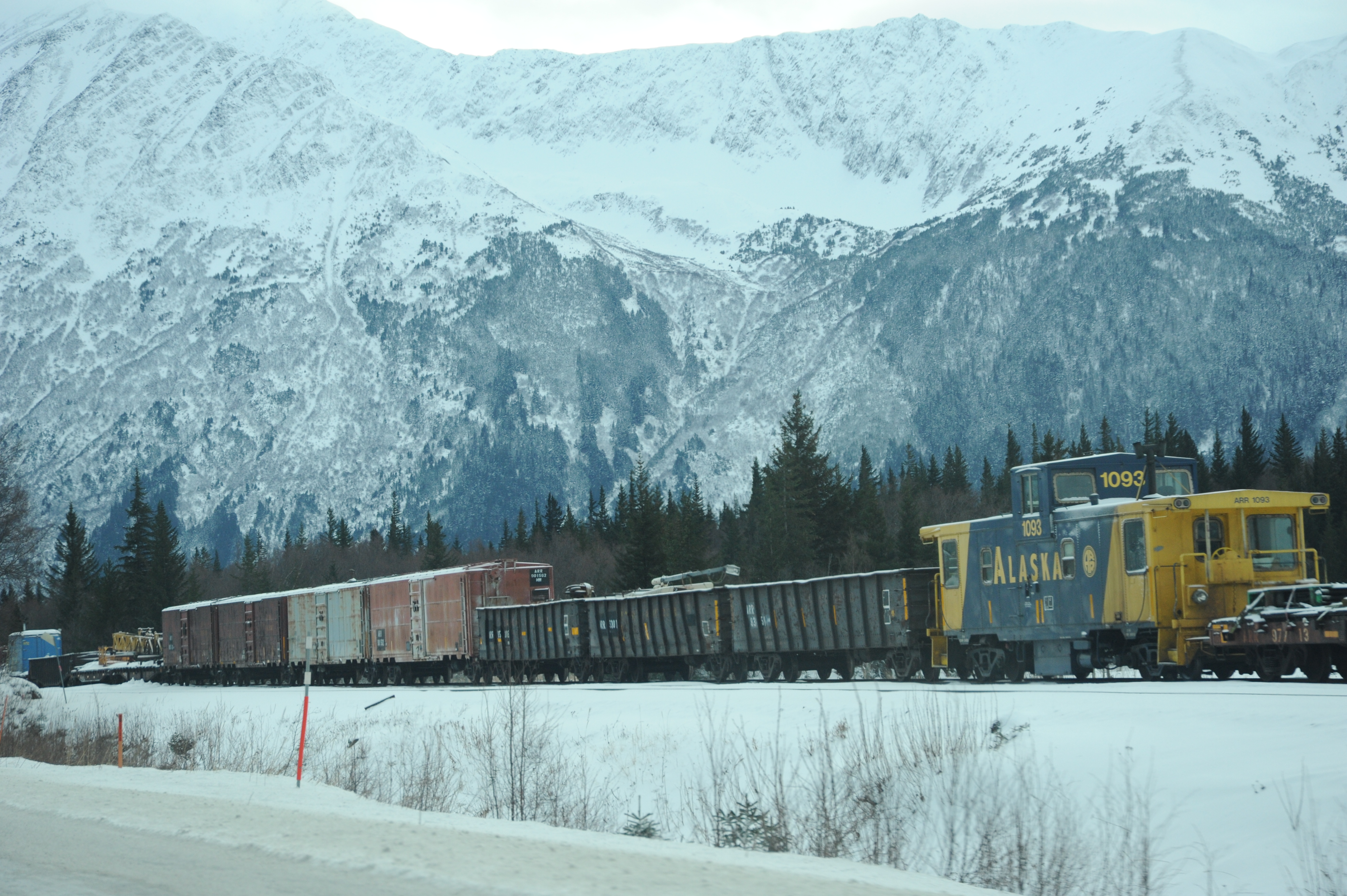
A work train with caboose ARR 1093 near Alyeska, in the winter of 2013

By 1936, the company had rostered 27 steam locomotives, 16 railcars, 40 passenger cars and 858 freight cars.

=== Active ===
As of 2022, Alaska Railroad rosters a total of 51 locomotives, two control cab units, and one DMU (self-propelled railcar):

- 28 EMD SD70MAC locomotives, Numbered 4001-4016, 4317-4328, 4129 and 4130. 12 (4317-4328) equipped with head-end power for passenger service. 4328 in a heritage livery.
- 15 EMD GP40-2 locomotives (Numbered 3001 to 3015)
- 8 EMD GP38-2 locomotives (Numbered 2001 to 2008)
- 2 EMD F40PH control cab units (Numbered 31 and 32)
- 1 Colorado Railcar DMU (Numbered 751)

=== Retired ===
- Budd Rail Diesel Car (RDC) (Retired 2009; sold to TriMet, in Oregon, as spare equipment for its WES Commuter Rail service)
- EMD MP15AC (Retired 2009)
- EMD GP49
- EMD F7
- EMD FP7 (Two units, 1510 and 1512 sold to Verde Canyon Railroad in Arizona for excursions)

=== Other ===
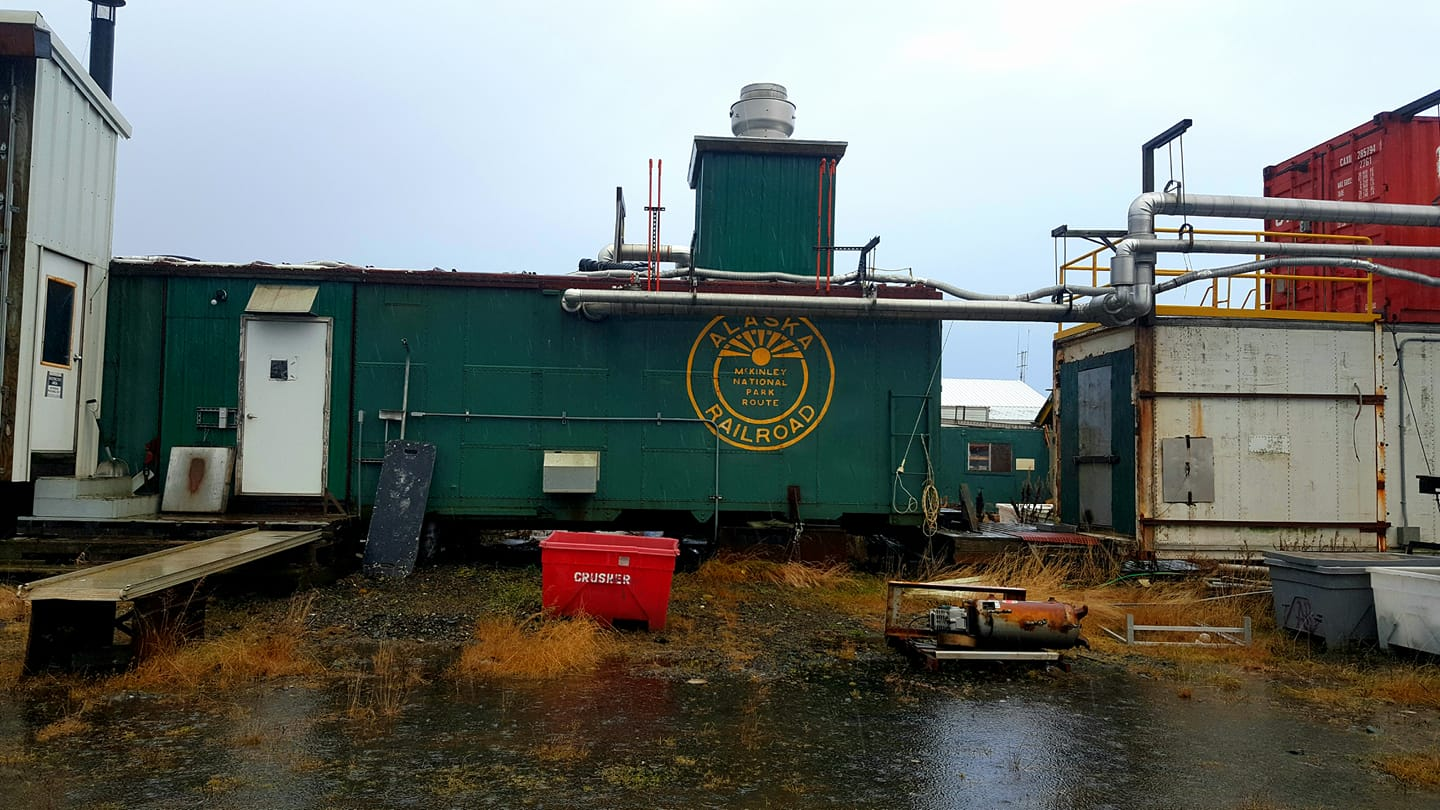
An older car repurposed as part of an ice plant on the Homer Spit

In 2011 the Alaska Railroad reacquired ARR 557, the last steam locomotive bought new by the railroad and the last steam locomotive used by the railroad, with the intent to refurbish and operate it in special excursions between Anchorage and Portage.

A USATC S160 "2-8-0 Consolidation" engine built in 1944 by Baldwin Locomotive Works, 557 was originally coal-fired but was converted to oil in 1955. It operated until 1964, when it was deemed surplus and sold as scrap. It was purchased by Monte Holm of Moses Lake, Washington and displayed in his House of Poverty Museum.

After Holm's death in 2006, Jim and Vic Jansen bought 557 from the museum and returned it to the Alaska Railroad on the condition that it be restored to operation and put into service.

The locomotive was sold to the non-profit Engine 557 Restoration Company for "One Dollar ($1.00) and other good and valuable considerations" and they have invested (as of January 2019) 77 months and over 75,000 hours of volunteer time in the restoration and overhaul.

== Ridership ==
The ridership statistics shown here are from the National Transit Database.

== See also ==
- Alaskan Engineering Commission, the Federal agency which constructed the Alaska railways
- Anton Anderson Memorial Tunnel
- Transportation in North America
- White Pass and Yukon Route
