= Davidson Ditch =

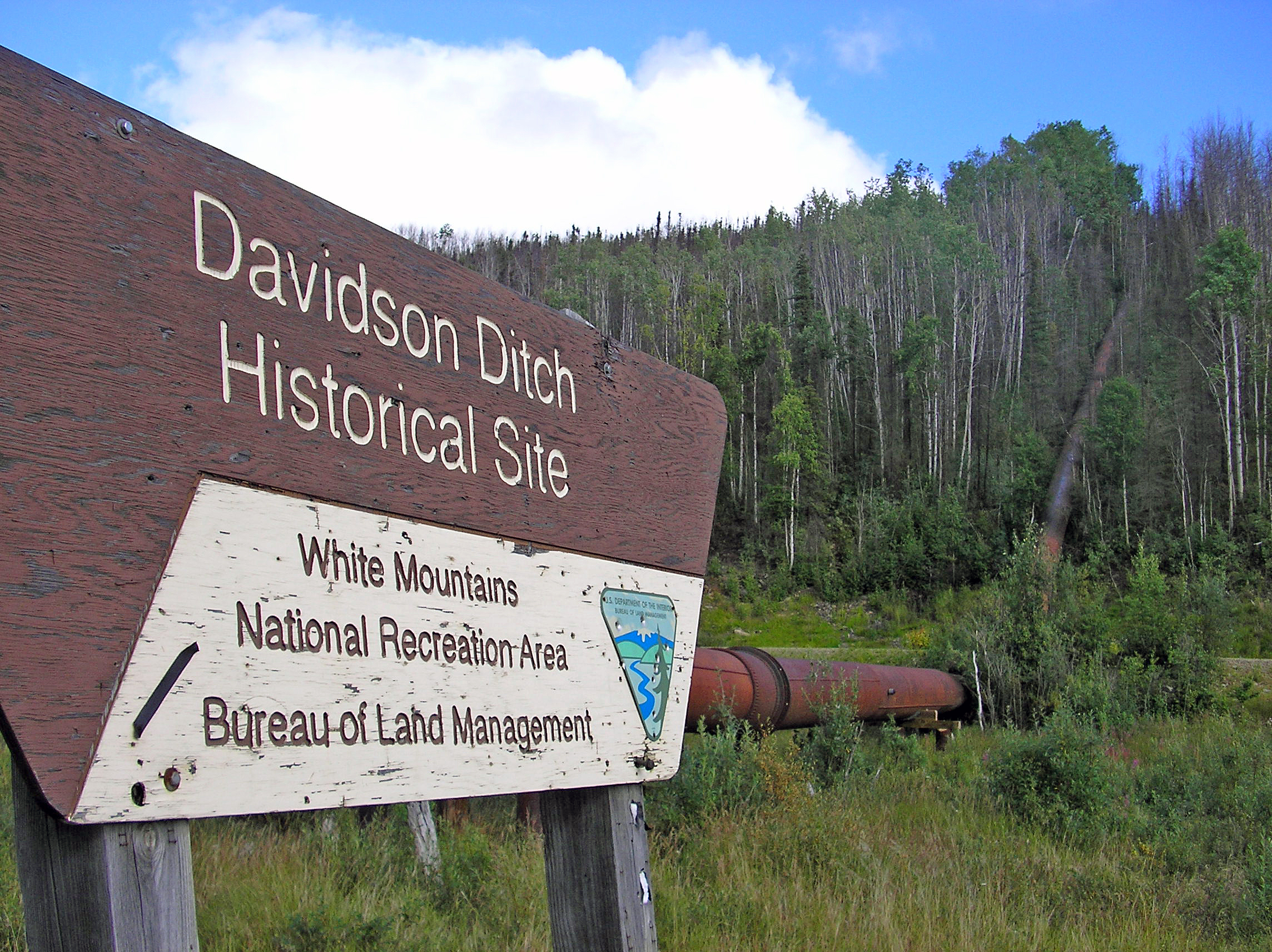
- An inverted siphon of Davidson Ditch, seen in 2008.

Location
- Country: Alaska, USA
- Coordinates: 65°13′35″N 146°57′9″W
- Direction: Northeast-Southwest
- Start: Chatanika River
- To: Goldstream Creek area
- Runs alongside: Steese Highway

General information
- Type: water
- Commissioned: 1928

Technical information
- Length: 90 mi (140 km)
- Maximum discharge: 180,000 US gallons (680 m^{3}) per day

Davidson Ditch is a 90-mile (140 km) conduit built in the 1920s to supply water to gold mining dredges in central Alaska. It was the first large-scale pipeline construction project in Alaska, and lessons learned in its construction were applied to the building of the Trans-Alaska Pipeline System. It is eligible for inclusion on the National Register of Historic Places, but has not been listed due to a lack of information. Despite this, the remains of the conduit are partially protected by its inclusion in the White Mountains National Recreation Area.

== Planning and surveying ==
In 1902, the discovery of gold north of the Chena River in central Alaska drew thousands of people who hoped to strike it rich. The town of Fairbanks, Alaska was founded as a result of the rush to mine ore. By 1910, most of the valuable claims had been staked and excavated by placer miners and people excavating mines by hand. Gold production declined, and by 1920, less than $1 million (1920 dollars) in gold was being produced annually.

Mining engineer Norman Stines observed the success of gold mining dredges near Nome and believed the same technique could be applied to Fairbanks. The problem was the lack of available water in the gold-mining areas. Dredges float on barges, and hydraulic mining, which uses water under pressure to remove overburden, requires a lot of water. The obvious solution was to construct an aqueduct of some kind to divert water from nearby rivers, but no aqueduct of the needed scale had ever been built in Alaska.

Stines contacted surveyor and engineer James Davidson, who had built the 50 miles (80 km) Miocene Ditch that allowed the use of dredges near Nome. In 1920, when Stines arrived in Nome, Davidson was working for a series of hydraulic mining operations and for a company supplying drinking water to Nome. Davidson was enthusiastic about the idea, and he traveled to Fairbanks in 1923 to study the water situation. One year later, Stines began drilling. His operations caught the attention of W.P. Hammon of the American Exploration Co. (later the United States Smelting, Refining and Mining Company). Hammon had been intrigued by the idea of a similar project and first examined it in 1907, but it was not cost-effective at that time. By 1923, the Alaska Railroad was in operation to Fairbanks, greatly cutting transportation costs, and coal from mines near Healy opened the door for the expansion of steam power in the area.

Hammon began negotiations with Stines, and together they formed the Fairbanks Exploration Company (FE Co.), a subsidiary of United States Smelting, Refining and Mining Company. The new company paid for the project and supervised construction. Stines was named general manager of the new company, and he contacted Davidson to head a 22-man survey crew to determine the best way to get water to the mining sites. Davidson's survey team determined that the best way to get sufficient water was to construct a 90 miles (140 km) conduit to divert water from the Chatanika River. In July 1924, Davidson's team began mapping the route.

== Construction ==
After the initial survey was complete, the 70-year-old Davidson retired. George Metcalfe was put in direct charge of the ditch, with Stines having supervision over both the ditch and the mining operations that would use the diverted water. J.B. Lippincott, an engineer from Los Angeles, was named the chief designer of the conduit.

The first crews began clearing the right of way for the ditch in April 1926. The route of the ditch roughly paralleled the Steese Highway, but because the territory of Alaska did not maintain the highway before June 1, the ditch workers also had to act as road crews. A handful of work camps were established up and down the route to house workers. In addition to scraping moss and clearing brush, the workers cleared loose rock and debris. In some places, solid schist had to be blasted out of the route of the ditch. As site clearing began, the final elements of the location survey were completed, allowing work to progress on the entire length of the project.

When the Davidson Ditch was constructed, bulldozers had not yet gained wide acceptance. Despite this, heavy machinery did much of the excavation work. Steam shovels, graders, and tractors worked through 1926 and 1927 after the site had been prepared. Because of the heavy winter snowfall and extreme cold temperatures, work typically halted in October and recommenced in April each year. In many places, it was necessary to employ gangs of workers equipped with shovels. The work parties excavated places inaccessible to the heavy machinery that performed much of the work on the project. In most places where water was conveyed in a canal, the ground was excavated to a depth of 4 feet (1.2 m). To avoid problems with permafrost and frozen ground, the excavation was accomplished in stages. The uppermost layer of soil was removed, exposing frozen ground. The sun would heat the newly exposed ground and thaw it. When thawed, it could be removed more easily and the process would repeat until the desired depth was reached.

In addition to the excavated portions of the ditch, the project also included the construction of several inverted siphons. These were required because the route of the ditch gradually descended along natural ridges so it could be built without requiring pumps to move the water. The inverted siphons carried the water across low points in the ridges (such as where they were crossed by streams or rivers), and were made of steel pipe. The pipe used in the siphons was cast in the Lower 48, transported by barge to an Alaska port, then by train and truck to the job site. The pipes ranged in diameter from 46 to 56 inches (120 to 140 cm) and were made from steel. They were supported by timber pilings created from wood harvested at the site of the ditch.

The project also required that a 0.7 miles (1.1 km) tunnel be excavated through solid rock near Fox. No specialized drilling equipment was available in Alaska, so the majority of work was performed with hand drills and explosives.

The construction project concluded on May 18, 1928, when the first water flowed into Davidson Ditch. It finished ahead of schedule but over budget. In total, Davidson Ditch cost $1,773,841 to build, about $100,000 more than its anticipated price of $1,662,894. Just over one million dollars was allocated to construction of the siphons alone, which made up less than ten percent of the route's length.

== Technical details ==
At maximum flow, the ditch was capable of transporting 180,000 US gallons (680 m^{3}) of water per day. It included 15 inverted siphons that covered a distance of 6.13 miles (9.87 km). A tunnel 0.7 miles (1.1 km) long also made up part of the ditch. The remainder was open canal. The longest section of pipeline was a 7,961 feet (2,427 m) siphon that crossed the Chatanika River with a head of 544 feet (166 m). The pipe had to cross its source because it had a gradient of 2.112 feet per mile (40.00 cm/km), which was less than the river's gradient.

A total of 1,555,754 cubic yards (1,189,459 m^{3}) of earth was moved in the course of the project. Of this, about 100,000 cubic yards (76,000 m^{3}) was solid rock, and 10,000 cubic yards (7,600 m^{3}) was "frozen earth", as defined by the project. Approximately 100,000 cubic yards (76,000 m^{3}) of earth was excavated by hand.

== Use and retirement ==
In the first year after the ditch's opening in May 1928, it was beset by problems. Numerous leaks and breakages occurred, often causing work stoppages at the dredges and mining operations that relied on its water. Eventually, FE Co. managers instituted a 24-hour watch of Davidson Ditch. Watchmen were employed to patrol its length, perpetually examining it for leaks and problems. In the winter, it was patrolled by dog team. Famed musher Leonhard Seppala was employed in this capacity by FE Co. and was named the chief watchman of the ditch. Seppala had telephone lines laid between watch cabins stationed every 15 to 20 miles (24 to 32 km) along the route. These allowed for quick repairs in the event of damage or for quick reaction if the water level became too high.

The same year that the ditch went online, three dredges were in operation just north of Fairbanks. In 1929, two more were built, and all five were operating in 1930. Gold production correspondingly increased from $347,000 in 1927 to $940,000 in 1928 and $2.7 million in 1930. Between 1928 and 1964, FE Co. produced $125 million (at $35 per ounce ($1.2/g)) from the dredges fed by Davidson Ditch. Mining was briefly halted by World War II, but restarted after the war and continued until 1952.

In that year, the price of gold fell and FE Co. went out of business. Davidson Ditch lay dormant until 1958, when the new Chatanika Power Company purchased it and used one of the siphons to power a hydroelectric plant that drove a dredging operation near Chatanika. The 1967 Fairbanks Flood ended this operation when it destroyed the dam on the Chatanika River that forced water into Davidson Ditch. The power plant was shut down and the ditch was abandoned.

In 1970, engineers working on the Trans-Alaska Pipeline visited the remains of Davidson Ditch to gain insights about cold-weather pipeline construction. They found many of the wooden pipe supports still intact, and they also took away lessons on the importance of having a support road and the need to excavate and protect frozen material. In 1974, some 50 short tons (45 t) of steel pipe were removed from the ditch and scrapped. Today, the Bureau of Land Management preserves the remains of the ditch as a portion of the White Mountains National Recreation Area. The portion of Davidson Ditch that parallels the Steese Highway can be seen at milepost 57.3 (92.2 km) of the highway, where a small display about the ditch has been constructed.
