= Nenana =

Nenana may refer to:

- Nenana (steamer), a five-deck, western river, sternwheel paddleship
- Nenana Depot, an Alaska Railroad depot built in 1922
- Nenana Municipal Airport, a city-owned public-use airport located one mile south of the central business district of Nenana
- Nenana River, a tributary of the Tanana River
- Nenana Valley, an archaeological site in the Yukon-Koyukuk Census Area of Alaska
- Nenana, Alaska, a Home Rule City in the Yukon-Koyukuk Census Area of the Unorganized Borough in the Interior of the U.S. state of Alaska
