= Orah Dee Clark =

American educator (1875–1965)

- Orah Dee Clark, 1962
- Born: 1875; Firth, Nebraska, United States
- Died: 1965 (aged 89–90); Alaska, United States
- Occupation: Educator
- Known for: First superintendent for the first school in Anchorage, Alaska

Orah Dee Clark (1875–1965) was an American educator. She was the first superintendent for the first school in Anchorage, Alaska. In 2009, she was inducted into the Alaska Women's Hall of Fame.

== Early life and work ==
Orah Dee Clark was born in Firth, Nebraska. Clark started teaching in 1906, which is when she moved to Alaska. She worked in Kodiak, Anvik, and Tanana, Alaska. Clark was the first superintendent of the first school in Anchorage, Alaska starting in 1915. After teaching in Anchorage, she co-founded schools along the Alaska Railroad. She would teach throughout Alaska, including the Aleutian Islands. She would never marry, per law that women teachers either had to be "married to the students" or leave the field to be married. She was a proponent of desegregated schools where Native American and white students could learn together. As of her retirement, in 1944, she was teaching in Moose Pass, Alaska.

== Later life and legacy ==
Clark Middle School, which opened in 1959, was named after her. In 1962, she was awarded the Scroll of Honor by the Cook Inlet Historical Society. In 1980, the school where she served as the first superintendent, the Pioneer School House, was added to the National Register of Historic Places. In 2009, Clark was inducted into the Alaska Women's Hall of Fame. Her papers are held in the collection of the University of Alaska Fairbanks. The Anchorage Woman's Club awards a high school scholarship for boys and girls named after Clark. The Anchorage Museum holds a collection of photographs once owned by Clark.
