= Pioneer School House =

- U.S. National Register of Historic Places
- Alaska Heritage Resources Survey
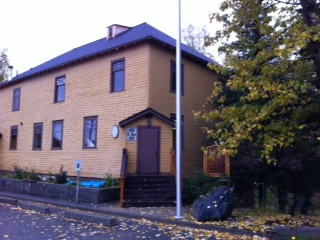

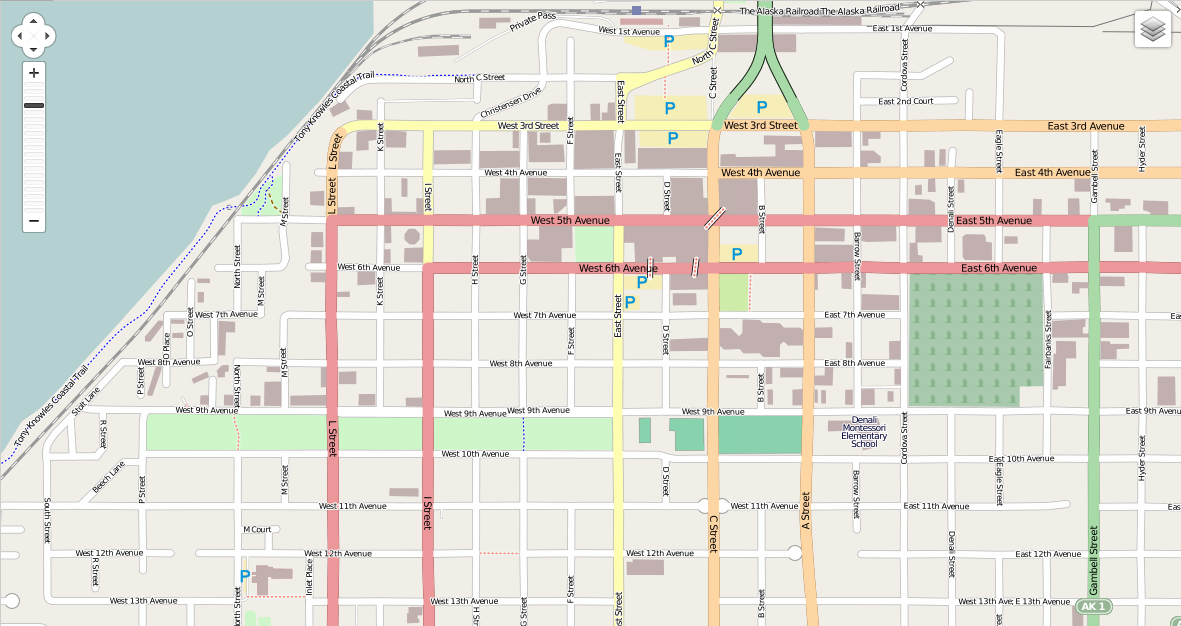
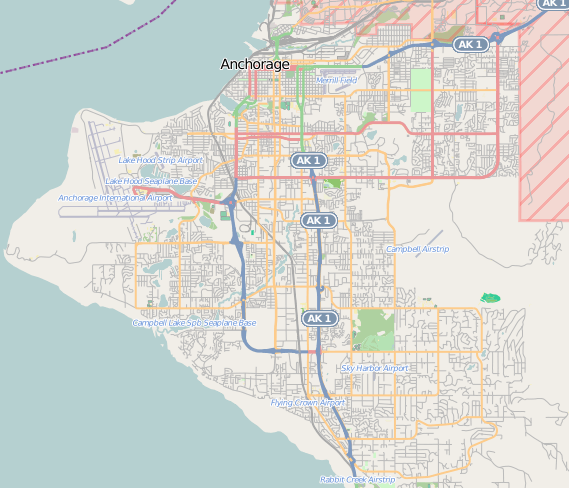
- Location within Downtown Anchorage Location within Anchorage Location within Alaska
- Location: 3rd Avenue and Eagle Street, Anchorage, Alaska
- Coordinates: 61°13′12″N 149°52′32″W
- Area: 1 acre (0.40 ha)
- Built: 1915
- Built by: Alaska Engineering Commission
- NRHP reference No.: 80000747
- AHRS No.: ANC-244
- Added to NRHP: December 3, 1980

The Pioneer School House is a historic former school building at 3rd Avenue and Eagle Street in Anchorage, Alaska.

== Background ==
In 1914–1915, Anchorage's population grew quickly when workmen and their families moved to the area to work on building the Alaska Railroad. In 1915 Frederick Mears's wife, Jane Mears, organized the Anchorage Woman's Club specifically to facilitate establishing a school for the children of the workers.

== Building ==
The two-story building was designed and built by the Alaska Engineering Commission in 1915 during the first year of the city's growth. It is a hipped roof building 30.3 by 48.3 feet (9.2 m × 14.7 m) in plan, covered by shiplap siding.

The school served about ninety elementary and high school students in 1915 and 1916. Orah Dee Clark was the first superintendent of the school. The town quickly outgrew the original schoolhouse and a second school was completed in 1917. The Pioneer School House was moved across the street to its current location in 1917 or after. The disused original schoolhouse was then used as a social hall by the Pioneers of Alaska Igloo 15 from the 1920s until 1964.

The building was saved from demolition after the earthquake of 1964 through the efforts and funds provided by the Anchorage Woman's Club.

The building was listed on the U.S. National Register of Historic Places in 1980. Its NRHP nomination notes:

In its era, the school was labeled "entirely inadequate," "insanitary," and was characteristically "of an order of the early eighteenth century." The school lacked paint, restrooms, running water, a satisfactory heating system, and a solid foundation. The unheated, outdoor toilets did not meet town site standards. Despite the shortcomings, the school was able to launch public education in Anchorage.

== See also ==
- National Register of Historic Places listings in Anchorage, Alaska
