= NCSD (disambiguation) =

The National Cyber Security Division is a division of the US Office of Cyber Security & Communications.

NCSD may also refer to:

- Nassau County School District, Florida
- Nenana City School District, Nenana, Alaska
- Novi Community School District, Novi, Michigan
- North Carolina School for the Deaf, Morganton, North Carolina
