= Kokomo Creek =

Kokomo Creek may refer to:

- Kokomo Creek a tributary of the Chatanika River, Alaska
- Kokomo Creek a creek in Hot Spring County, Arkansas
- Kokomo Creek (Indiana), a tributary of Wildcat Creek (Indiana)
