= Nenana Ice Classic =

Contest in Nenana, Alaska, United States

The Nenana Ice Classic is an annual ice pool contest held in Nenana, Alaska. It is an event in which individuals attempt to guess the exact time the Tanana River ice will break up at Nenana. Tickets are on sale from February 1 through April 5 of each year throughout Alaska. The Nenana Ice Classic is a non-profit charitable gaming organization. As such, the proceeds benefit many volunteer and non-profit organizations.

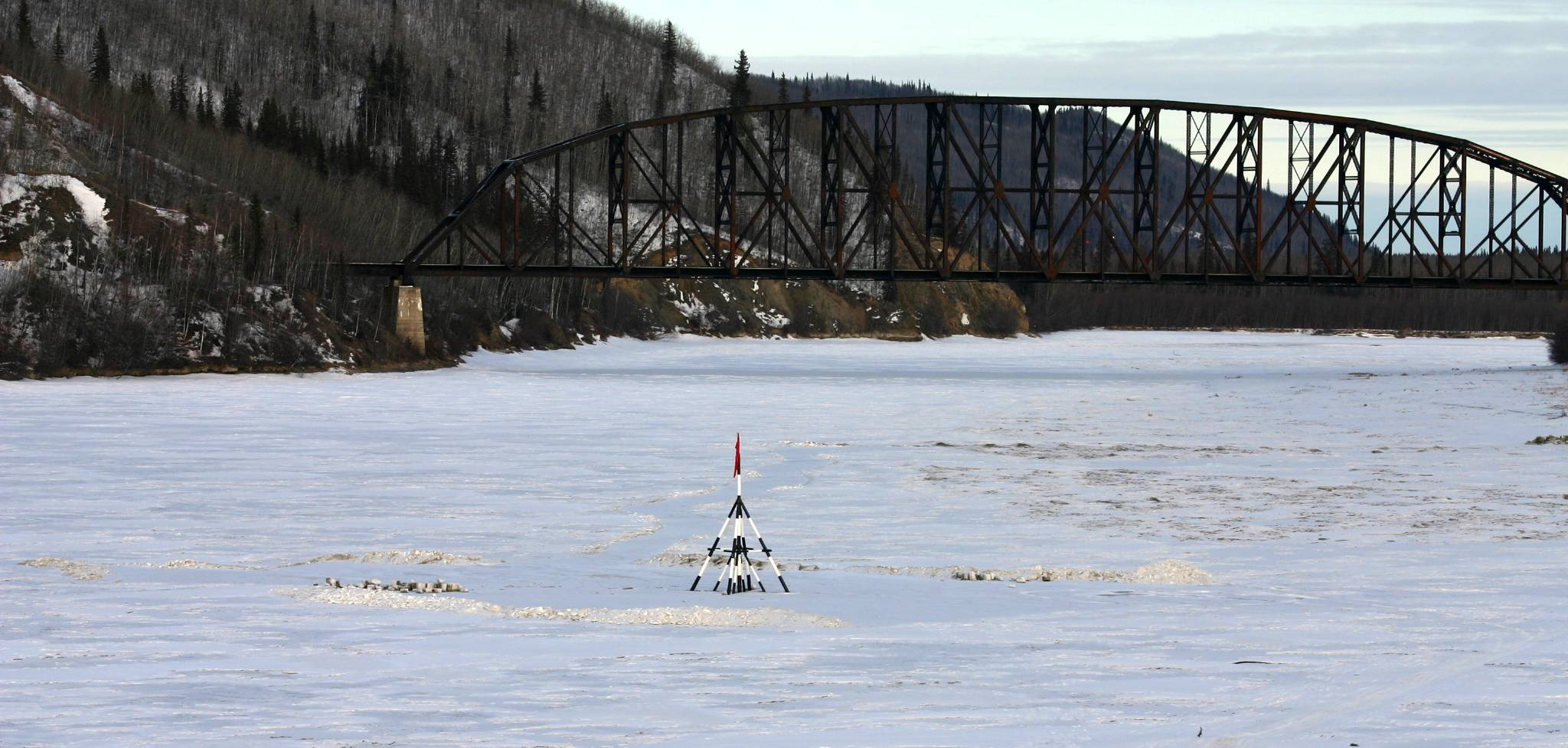
The Tanana River with the tripod on the ice during the 2008 Nenana Ice Classic. The Mears Memorial Bridge is in the background.

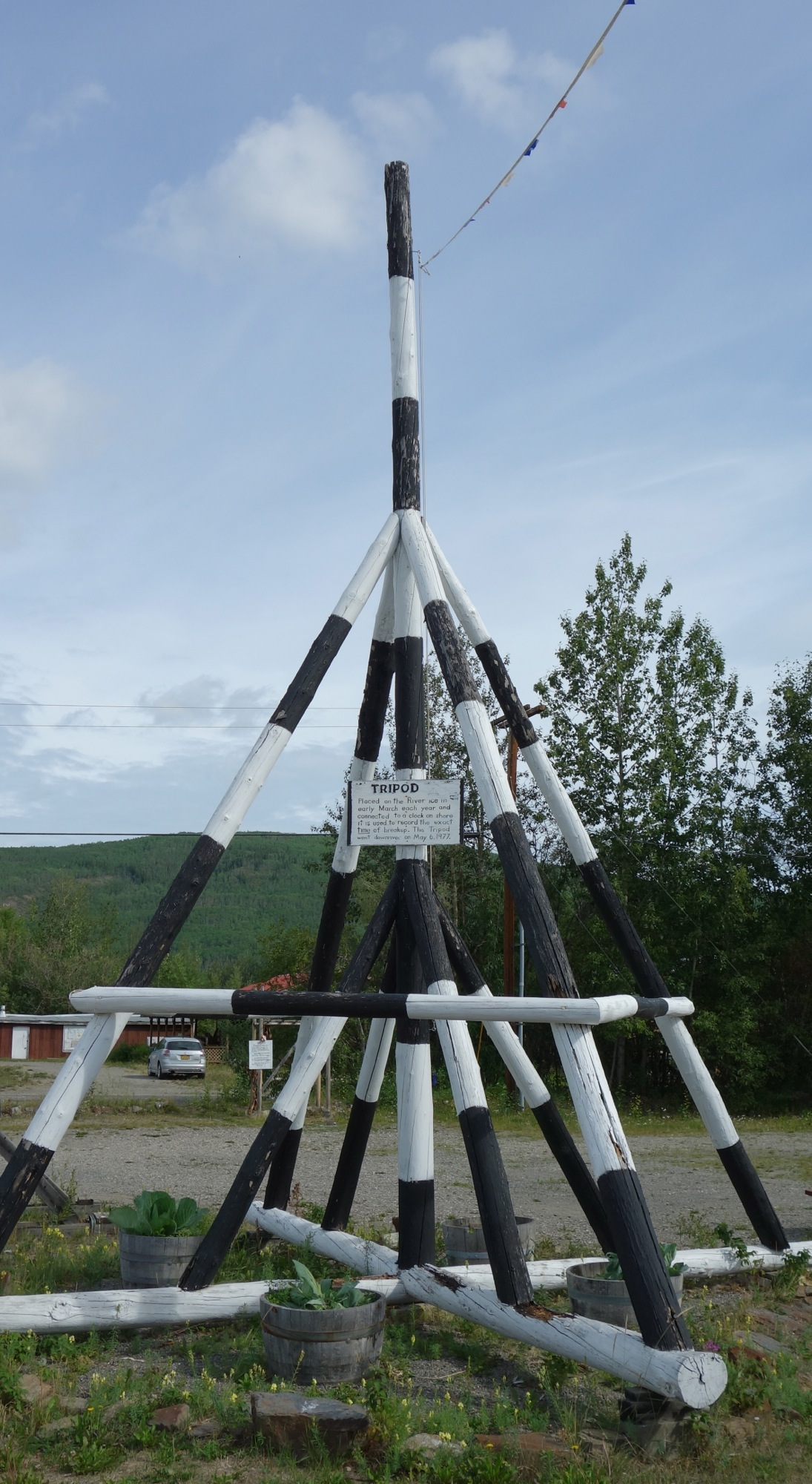
Closeup of the tripod, sitting on dry land. This large striped wooden structure is placed on the frozen Tanana River each year.

== History ==
The Ice Classic began as an ice betting pool in 1906 with six entries: Adolph Nelson, Jim Duke, Gunnysack Jack, Jonesy, Louis and Joe Johnson, and the first winner, Oliver Lee. After coming the closest to betting on breakup of the Tanana ice, Lee won an equivalent amount of "a couple of rounds at the trading post bar." The ice pool subsequently became inactive until 1916. In that year, railroad workers revived the betting through ticket sales at Jimmy Duke's Roadhouse, but limited the betting to Nenana residents. After word of the lottery spread to towns along the local railroad by Alaska Railroad Commission workers, the lottery was opened up to residents of the Alaska and Yukon territories in 1917.

In 1917, railroad engineers bet $801 on when the ice would break. In 2009 the 93rd annual prize money was $283,723. In 2014 the jackpot was a record $363,627. Since the Classic's beginning in 1906 over 10 million dollars in prize money has been given away.

Mid-March 2020 saw the COVID-19 pandemic as grounds for betting remotely.

== The Tripod ==
The "tripod", which actually has four supports, is planted on the river ice between the highway and railroad bridges in Nenana, 300 ft from the shore. The tripod is connected to a clock which stops as the ice goes out, moving the tripod with it. The Nenana Ice Classic annual festival is the time that the tripod is erected on the ice of the frozen Tanana River. The tripod parts are built and painted prior to the festival sourcing local timber and enlisting community members. Using a chainsaw, a trough is carved into the river ice which is usually around three feet thick at that time of year. The base of the tripod is lowered into the trough. An auger is implemented to bore a hole further into the ice until the river water is released, flooding the trough. This will freeze the tripod securely to the frozen river. As a high point during the festival the community gathers together and using ropes attached to the tripod uprights they work together to lift the uprights into place. The uprights are then secured to each other. A line is attached to the top of the tripod and once that end is anchored the other end is taken to the Ice Classic tower nearby on the banks of the river. Attached there to the clock inside the tower, when the ice goes out and moves the tripod 100 feet the line breaks and stops the clock.

== Ice measurements ==
The Tanana River at Nenana usually freezes between October and November, reaching an average peak thickness of 41 inches (104 cm) on April 1. The ice then melts on top due to weather and bottom due to water movement.

== Winning days ==
Through 2026, the earliest ice melt date has been April 14, and the latest May 20. The most common ice melt times have been in the afternoon, between noon and 4:00 PM.

=== Historical Ice Melt Days ===
April 14	2019
April 15	-
April 16	-
April 17	-
April 18	-
April 19	-
April 20	1940, 1998
April 21	-
April 22	-
April 23	1993, 2012, 2016
April 24	1990, 2004, 2015
April 25	2014
April 26	1926, 1995
April 27	1988, 2007, 2020, 2024, 2025
April 28	1943, 1969, 2005
April 29	1939, 1953, 1958, 1980, 1983, 1994, 1999, 2003, 2010
April 30	1917, 1934, 1936, 1942, 1951, 1978, 1979, 1981, 1997, 2021
May 1	1932, 1956, 1989, 1991, 2000, 2009, 2017, 2018
May 2	1960, 1976, 2006, 2022
May 3	1919, 1941, 1947
May 4	1944, 1967, 1970, 1973, 2011, 2026
May 5	1929, 1946, 1957, 1961, 1963, 1987, 1996
May 6	1928, 1938, 1950, 1954, 1974, 1977, 2008
May 7	1925, 1965, 2002
May 8	1930, 1933, 1959, 1966, 1968, 1971, 1986, 2001, 2023
May 9	1923, 1955, 1984
May 10	1931, 1972, 1975, 1982
May 11	1918, 1920, 1921, 1924, 1985
May 12	1922, 1937, 1952, 1962
May 13	1927, 1948
May 14	1949, 1992
May 15	1935
May 16	1945
May 17	-
May 18	-
May 19	-
May 20	1964, 2013

== In popular culture ==
On March 27, 2022, the contest was featured on HBO show Last Week Tonight with John Oliver where the host pledged a donation to the Food Bank of Alaska.
