= 2008 Tanana Valley flood =

2008 flood in Alaska, United States

Coordinates: 64.4°N 147.0°W

Tanana Valley Flood of 2008
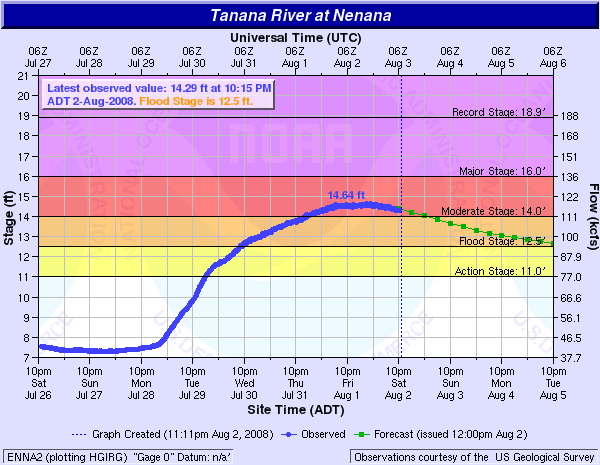
- Graph of flood depths of the Tanana River at Nenana
- Date: July 28–Aug. 3, 2008
- Location: Salcha, Fairbanks, Nenana
- Deaths: 0 deaths
- Property damage: $10 million+ (2008)

In late July and early August 2008, several floods affected several rivers in the central portion of the American state of Alaska. The city of Fairbanks, Alaska saw high water levels, while the towns of Nenana, Salcha, and Old Minto received heavy damage. The Salcha River and Tanana River reached their second-highest levels since record-keeping began (the highest was during the 1967 Tanana Valley Flood), while the Chena River, which bisects Fairbanks, was kept below flood stage by the use of the Chena River Lakes Flood Control Project.

Several hundred homes were inundated by the flood in Fairbanks, Salcha, unincorporated Fairbanks North Star Borough, Nenana, and smaller villages, but due to early warnings from the National Weather Service, volunteer fire departments, and the borough's emergency contact system, no one was injured. The area affected by the flood was declared a state disaster area, making residents whose homes were flooded eligible for state aid. The long-term effects of the flood, including its effect on the salmon spawning season, are as yet unknown.

== Background ==
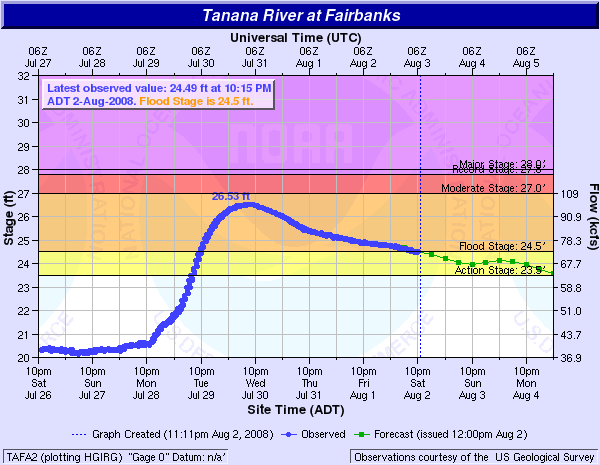
A National Weather Service hydrology graph of the Tanana River's height at Fairbanks during the flood

The summer of 2008 was an unusually wet one for central Alaska. In June, the National Weather Service recorded 2.1 inches (53 mm) of precipitation at the Fairbanks International Airport—the most in that month since June 1994, and 0.68 inches (17 mm) above average. By July 27, 1.47 inches of rain had fallen in July. This was slightly below the average for the month at that time (1.49 inches), but the year-to-date rainfall total was still one and two-thirds inches above normal. The next day, July 28, 1.14 inches of rain fell in Fairbanks, setting a single-day Fairbanks rainfall total for that date, with heavier amounts measured east of the town. Scattered locations between Salcha and Delta Junction received up to four inches of precipitation. On the 29th, another 0.77 inches of rain fell in Fairbanks—another record for the date—and again, locations outside of the town received greater amounts. Just 0.14 inches of rain fell on the 30th, but on the 31st, 0.6 inches fell. This amount was not a record for the date, but it brought the overall rainfall total in Fairbanks for the month of July to 4.12 inches—more than double the normal average of 1.73 inches (44 mm) of rain. At Eielson Air Force Base, which lies to the southwest of Fairbanks, 7.30 inches of rain were recorded as having fallen in July, making it the rainiest July ever recorded and the second-rainiest month ever recorded at the base. Though more rain fell on August 1 and afterward, the Tanana, Salcha, and Chena rivers had already crested.

== Flood ==
=== Salcha ===
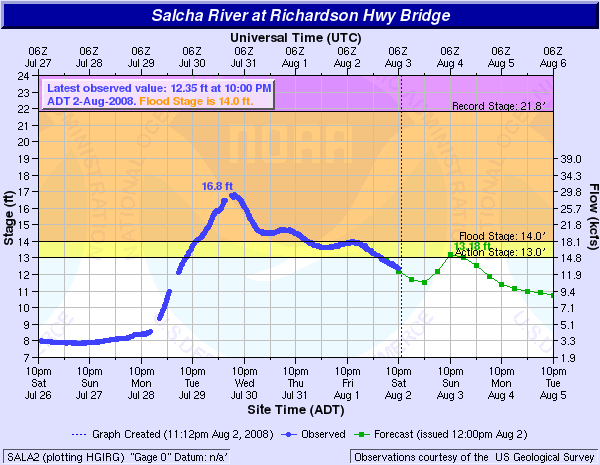
A National Weather Service graph recorded the height of the Salcha River during the flood

By the evening of July 28, the record-breaking rainfall that had fallen to that point caused the National Weather Service to issue a flood warning for the tributaries of the Tanana River east of Fairbanks. On the 29th, the continued rain forced the expansion of the flood warning to cover the entire Tanana and Salcha River basins between Salcha and Nenana, a stretch of land 320 miles (510 km) long. The rising Salcha River forced home evacuations on the 29th and caused the Old Richardson Highway to be closed in several locations as the Salcha overflowed its banks and covered the road near the town of Salcha. An emergency shelter was set up to handle refugees from the Salcha River's flooding, and forecasters predicted the river would continue to rise.

On the 30th, the Salcha River crested at 16.8 feet—almost three feet above flood stage—where it crosses the Richardson Highway. This was the sixth-highest crest since measurements began in the first half of the 20th century. The last time the river reached that height was October 15, 2000, when the river crested at 16.91 feet (5.15 m). More than 100 homes were at least partially underwater, and nearly two dozen Salcha town residents took advantage of the emergency shelter that had been set up at Salcha Elementary School the day before.

High water remained in Salcha through the 31st, though the crest of the flooding had passed. Water continued to cover roads in and around Salcha, and water-borne debris accumulated under several local bridges, causing impromptu dams. By August 1, the Salcha River had begun to recede to a noticeable extent. Though some roads remained underwater and falling trees knocked out power to areas of the town, residents began to pump out basements and begin recovery efforts. By early afternoon on the first, the Old Richardson Highway had been cleared of water and the National Weather Service canceled its flood warning for the Salcha area.

=== Fairbanks ===
The first effects of the flood began to be felt in Fairbanks late on the 29th, as the Tanana River overflowed its banks and covered low-lying areas of South Fairbanks. Thought was given on that date to closing the floodgates of the Moose Creek Dam, located on the Chena River as part of the Chena River Lakes Flood Control Project, but the Chena's rise was not as rapid as that of the Tanana, which lies to the south of the town, and no action was taken on the 29th. Engineers also considered lowering the gates on the 30th, but the flow of the Chena River had not reached a level where computer models mandated the closing of the gates to protect Fairbanks.

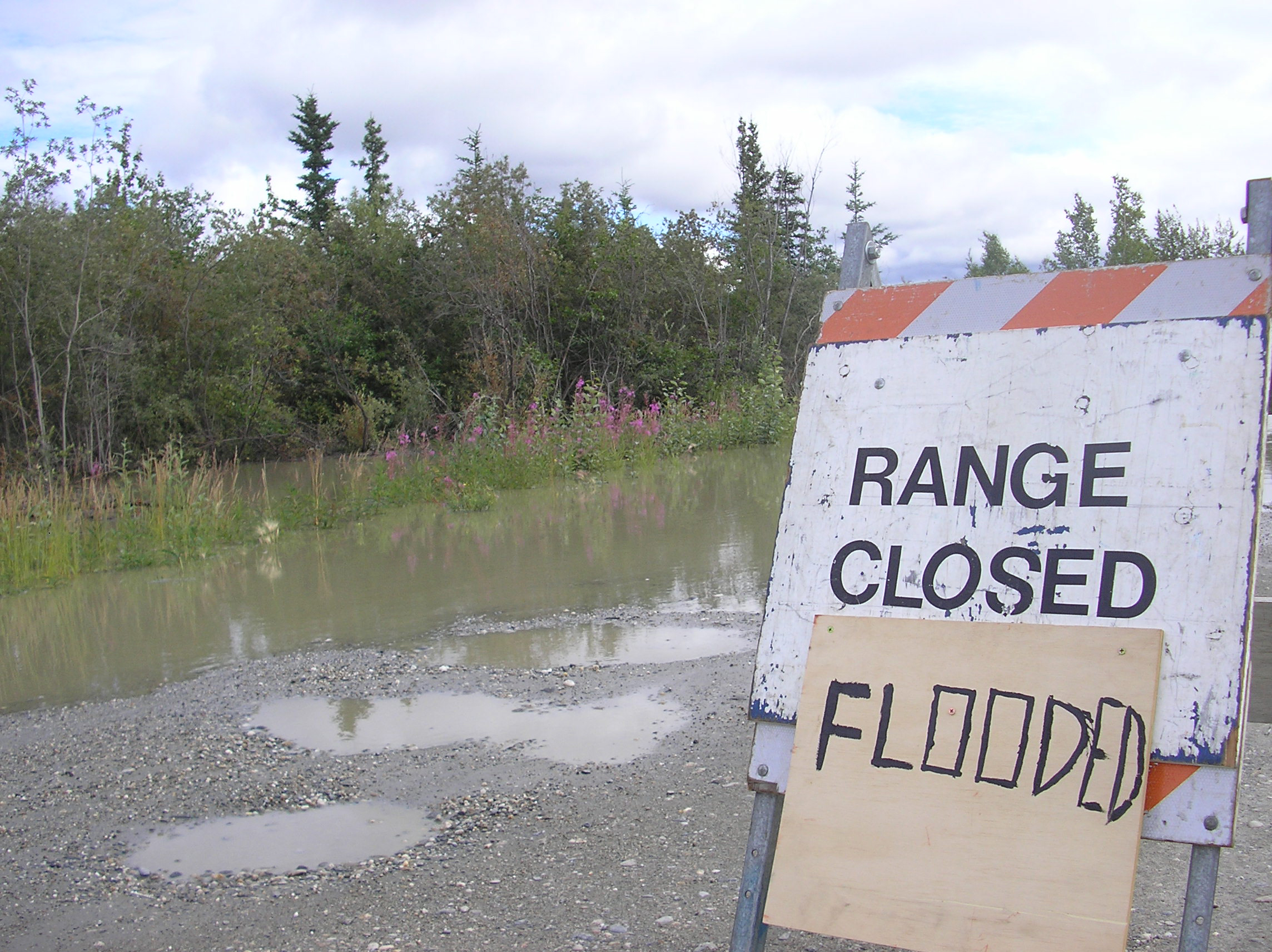
A Fairbanks shooting range is closed due to flooding.

The Tanana River, which is not controlled by the flood project, meanwhile reached a crest of 26.60 feet at Fairbanks on the 30th. This amount was more than two feet above flood stage and was the highest level seen since August 1967, when the river crested at 27.80 feet (8.47 m) during the great 1967 Fairbanks flood. The height of the water caused flooding in the Rosie Creek and Chena Pump neighborhoods west of Fairbanks, and caused some residents to evacuate. Residents who remained were placed under a boil-water order for fear that floodwater had contaminated the public drinking water system. In response to the continuing spread of the flood, Fairbanks and Fairbanks North Star Borough authorities opened an emergency operations center to handle the response to the flood and answer residents' questions. Residents of the Rosie Creek neighborhood were awakened in the early morning hours of the 31st by borough warnings and volunteer firefighters, who instructed them to evacuate. High water had surrounded the residents' homes, causing many to flee to a shelter set up at a nearby elementary school. No residents were injured in the evacuation, something many of them credited to prompt and efficient warnings. The continued high water of the Tanana River caused overflow to flood into the nearby Chena, normally a tributary of the Tanana. Despite that unusual flow, engineers at the Chena River Lakes Flood Control Project decided not to close the project's floodgates, forecasting that the Chena would not rise above flood stage, even with the increased flow.

By the morning of August 1, the Tanana River had begun to fall in Fairbanks, just as the Salcha River had begun to recede in Salcha. Though isolated roads continued to wash out from heavy water flow and residents were not allowed to return to their homes, the water level of the river continued to fall. Due to this fact, the opening of Fairbanks' Tanana Valley Fair—scheduled for August 1—was not delayed. Despite the falling water level in the Tanana, the Chena River continued to rise due to the differing water levels in the two rivers. This fact caused the U.S. Army Corps of Engineers to close the floodgates of the Chena River Lakes Flood Control Project at 3:30 a.m. on August 1. They remained closed throughout the day before being reopened at 5:30 a.m. on August 2.

=== Nenana ===
Though Nenana also received heavy rain from the storm system that began the flood, its position further downstream on the Tanana River meant that it did not receive the first effects of the flood until the 30th, when Alaska Railroad officials suspended operations south of Nenana due to track damage caused by rising water.

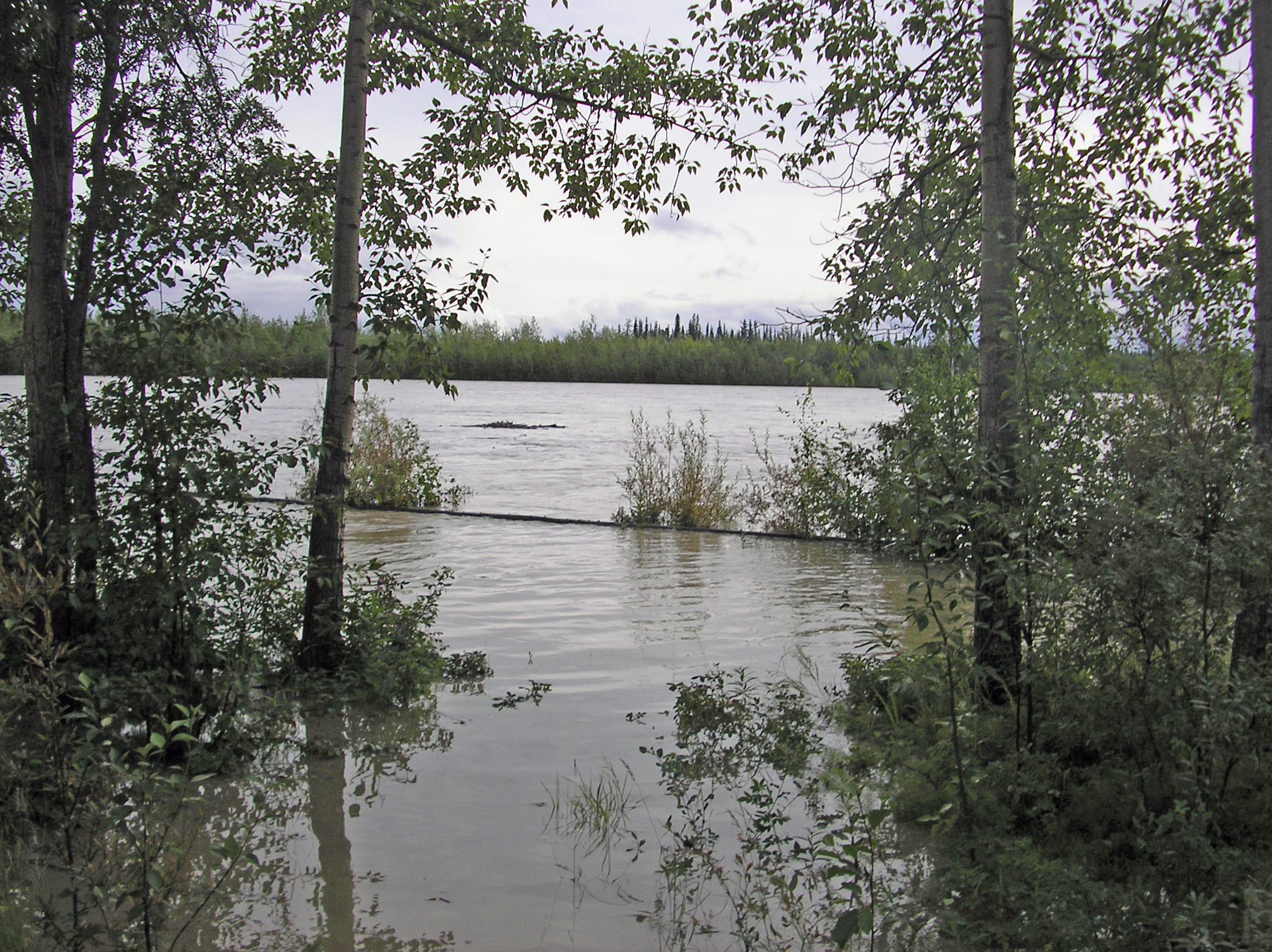
The Tanana River overflows its banks during the flood.

On July 31, the Tanana River began to overflow its banks in Nenana. Water flooded the rails of the Alaska Railroad in town, caused an evacuation of the town's clinic, and flooded low-lying areas throughout the town. By August 1, the entire town was at least partially flooded, with most basements and other low-lying areas being completely filled by floodwater. The flooding of the Alaska Railroad track in town forced a halt to all passenger and freight operations between Anchorage and Fairbanks, effectively cutting off Fairbanks from rail traffic.

On August 2, the Tanana River at Nenana crested at 14.64 feet. This total was more than four feet above flood stage and was the third-highest water level ever recorded, falling short of a 15.9-foot mark in 1948 and the record 18.9-foot mark recorded during the flood of 1967. The town shipyard was submerged under three feet of water, and the town's clinic was moved from its interim location in the fire station to the town airport after floodwater threatened the station. Town leaders encouraged residents to evacuate to higher ground until the flood receded. Nenana High School was saved from flooding by just eight inches of elevation. Water lapped around the school's base, but did not enter the school itself due to that small margin. High water lingered in the town until August 3, when a National Weather Service forecaster felt confident enough to say, "The worst is over."

== Aftermath ==
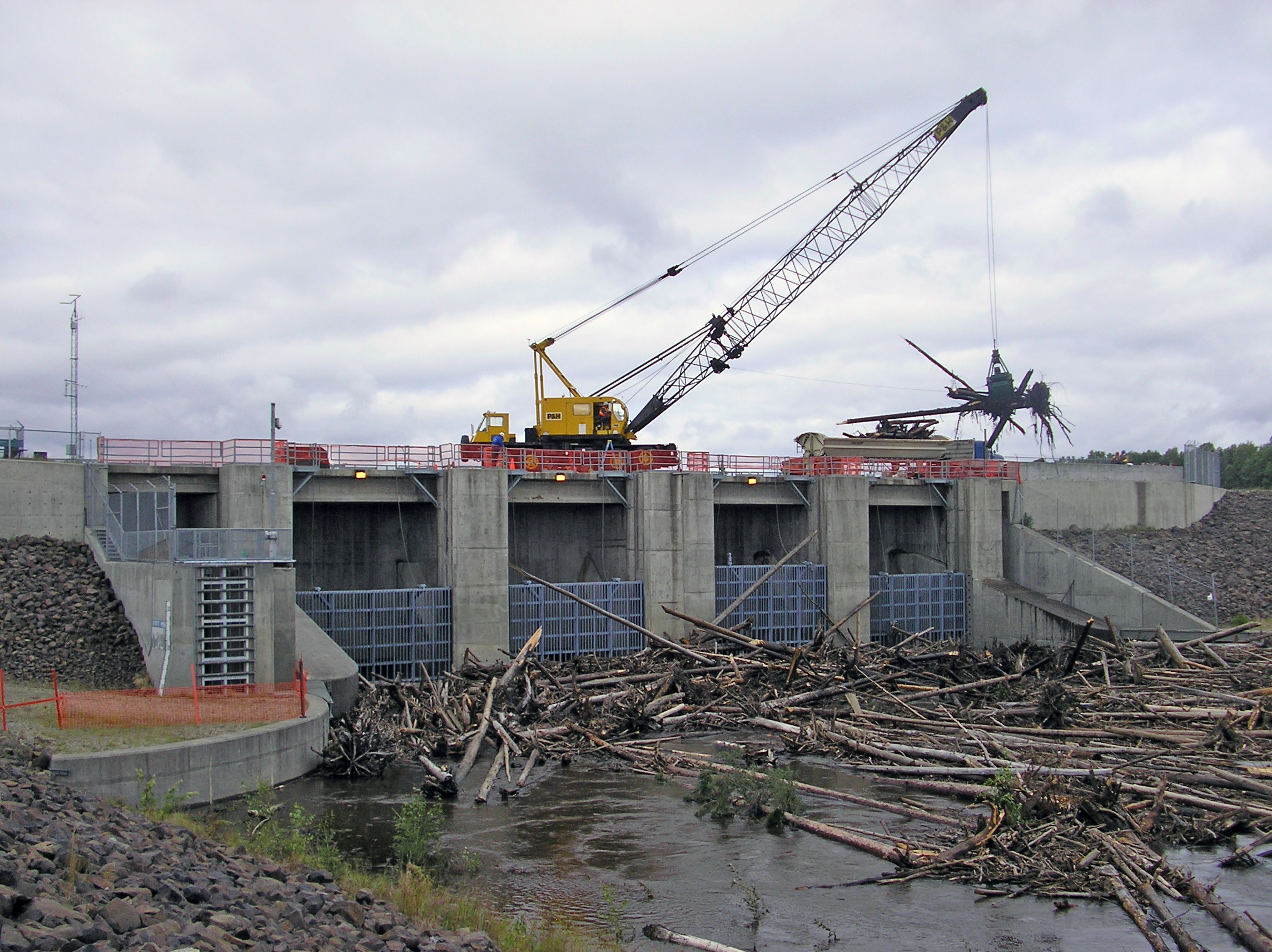
Engineers clear debris from behind Beaver Creek Dam at the Chena River Lakes Flood Control Project following the flood.

On the morning of August 1, the mayor of the Fairbanks North Star Borough, Jim Whitaker, issued a disaster declaration for the drainage area of the Tanana River. In the declaration, he appealed for help from state and federal governments in the recovery process, saying, "substantial damage is occurring due to high water and river current on the Tanana River, the Salcha River and the Chena River, resulting in damage to over 500 private residences with an estimated 1,000 inhabitants and to the road networks" maintained by the borough and the state. The next day, the Alaska commissioner of military and veterans affairs and the state director of homeland security and emergency management toured the flooded areas by helicopter. On August 4, Alaska governor Sarah Palin visited Fairbanks to officially sign the disaster declaration and tour the flooded area. By the middle of August, the total damage from the flooding was estimated to be more than $10 million. In late September, President Bush approved a federal disaster declaration for the affected area, allowing federal aid to be spent on reconstruction efforts for damaged homes and buildings.

Some Alaska subsistence fishermen feared the floods could exacerbate an already poor salmon fishing season by disrupting the spawning season for king salmon.
