= 1967 Fairbanks flood =

1967 flood in interior Alaska, United States

1967 Tanana Valley Flood
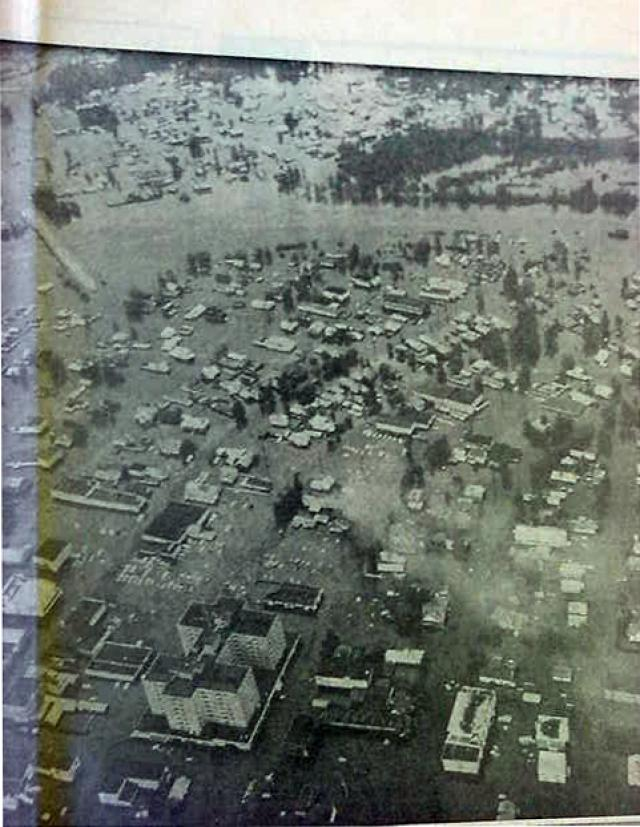
- Date: 12–20 August 1967
- Location: Salcha, Fairbanks, Nenana, Minto, Fort Wainwright
- Deaths: 6
- Property damage: $170+ million (1967)

The 1967 Tanana Valley Flood or 1967 Fairbanks Flood was a severe flood that affected east-central Alaska in August 1967. The city of Fairbanks, nearby Fort Wainwright, and Nenana saw record breaking water levels and widespread damage. Flooding was recorded over a large swath of the state, from Eagle on the east to Ruby on the west. Many major tributaries to the Yukon River saw flooding, including the Salcha, Chatanika, Tolovana, lower Tanana, and Birch Creek rivers. The worst flooding occurred in the White Mountains northeast of Fairbanks, although this area is sparsely populated.

All of Fairbanks was flooded, and more than 12,000 people were evacuated. Fairbanks and Nenana were declared national disaster areas. Six deaths were reported, along with damage exceeding $170 million. Due to repeated previous flood damage, the community of Minto relocated nearly 20 miles north after this flood.

As a result of the flood and to help prevent further disasters, stream and precipitation gauges were installed in the Chena River basin to monitor water levels. The U.S. Congress also approved the National Flood Insurance Act of 1968, authorizing the building of the Chena River Lakes Flood Control Project, which includes the Moose Creek Dam, the Tanana River Levee, and various drainage channels.

== Background ==
Historically, the Tanana River saw varied rates of flooding. Sediment studies at Luke's Slough, which is about 9 miles southwest of Fairbanks, show that between 1000 AD and 0 AD, flooding was relatively common. After that, floods were rare until around the 1500s. In the last 400 years, there were only three major floods in the sediment record, with a recurrence interval of 125 years.

On average, Fairbanks receives just over 11 inches of precipitation, either as rain or water equivalent. Roughly half of this is received from June through September as rain. By month, the averages are 1.39 inches for June, 1.84 inches for July, 2.20 inches for August, and 1.10 inches for September. Other months receive less than a water equivalent inch.

=== Geography ===
Fairbanks and nearby communities were established and expanded on the Tanana River floodplain and there were at least 15 serious floods recorded that happened in the area. The floodplain experiences two kinds of flooding, one from spring breakup and the other from short duration heavy rainfall in the summer. Major spring flooding from ice jams occurred in 1905, 1911, 1937 and 1948. Rain produced flooding happened only in August 1930 before the 1967 flood. The majority of the flood risk in the Fairbanks area is due to spring break up. However, ice jam flooding in the region is usually restricted, while rain-caused flooding affects a much larger area.

As early as 1930, residents of Fairbanks expressed concern about flooding from the Tanana River. Before 1945, a channel called Chena Slough branched off of the main channel of the Tanana River, and indicated that the Tanana River might be establishing its main channel further north upstream of Fairbanks.

=== Weather ===
Starting in July, a low north of Alaska and a high in the north Pacific set up a pattern of increased precipitation so that Fairbanks received over 3 inches of rain for the month. In August, a large scale pattern brought arctic air from the northwest of Alaska and increased winds from the southwest. This was in part due to the remnants of Tropical Storm Hope and an arctic front west of Fairbanks that brought in an atmospheric river from the Pacific on 8–11 August. On 12 August, weather conditions were similar to those found in squall lines in the Great Plains of the United States. From the 13th onwards, a low pressure system from Bristol Bay brought even more precipitation into the area. Rain was concentrated around central to eastern Interior Alaska, with much comparatively milder rainfall values in the Alaska Range and Denali National Park.

Significant rainfall occurred from 8 August and lasted until around 20 August, although it was variable at times. At the Fairbanks International Airport, a record breaking 6.15 inches of rain was reported between 8 and 15 August. On the 13th, the daily record of rain at the Fairbanks Airport was broken, with 3.61 inches of observed rain, which is still the highest daily total for that station. Between 10 and 15 August, several areas of heavy rain were recorded, as much as 7.18 inches just north of Talkeetna.

== Flood ==
=== Fairbanks Area ===
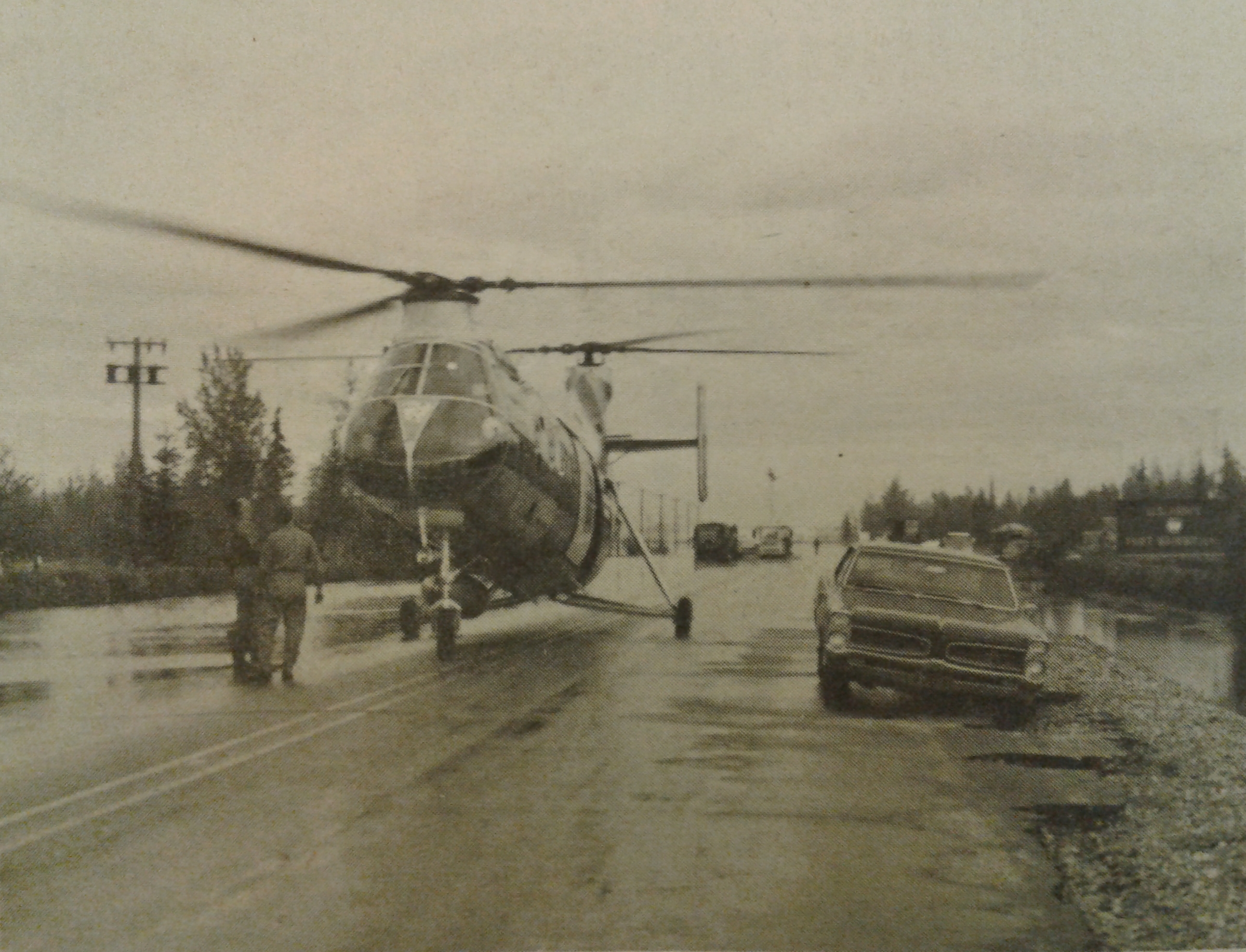
A Piasecki H-21 helicopter lands on Gaffney Road a short distance west of the main gate of Fort Wainwright during the flood.

The flood was the worst disaster in Fairbanks' history. Roughly 95% of Fairbanks was flooded, and the flood water's depth reached a maximum of 5 feet. Nearly every house received water damage, and there was at least an inch of brown mud on every submerged surface. The cost of damage in Fairbanks alone was estimated to be $85 million.

The Richardson Highway was washed out near Salcha for about half a mile.

=== Elsewhere ===
Upstream from Fairbanks there were numerous landslides caused by heavy rain, and several stream gauges were destroyed. Chena Hot Springs road also suffered washouts.

Nenana received widespread damage and was the only other community besides Fairbanks that had a population of over 300 at the time. Flooding was caused by both the Nenana and Tanana rivers. Estimated damages for Nenana ranged about $1 million.

Damage was reported by boaters along Birch Creek near Circle and a stream gauge within the Birch Creek basin was destroyed. The Steese Highway going to Circle was heavily damaged, both near Circle and along the Chatanika River corridor. Landslides were also reported in the area

Downriver from Nenana, the Tolovana River contributed to flooding, causing damage along the Elliot Highway.

Other damage included rural areas and the Alaska Railroad, valued at $7 million.

== Aftermath ==
Although flood control legislation was enacted in 1958, this flood brought new urgency. The U.S. Congress approved the National Flood Insurance Act of 1968, and the Flood Control Act of 1958 gave the authority to build the Chena River Lakes Flood Control Project, which includes the Moose Creek Dam, the Tanana River Levee, and various drainage channels.

In order to help prevent similar disasters, a network of precipitation and stream gauges was also installed along the Chena and Tanana river basins.

The community of Minto relocated from Old Minto to their current site in the years after this flood.

The severity of the flood of 1967 was so much higher in magnitude than any previously recorded flood that the frequency of such an event cannot be accurately.

== See also ==
- List of Alaska tropical cyclones
- 2008 Tanana Valley Flood
