= Firth, Nebraska =

- Village
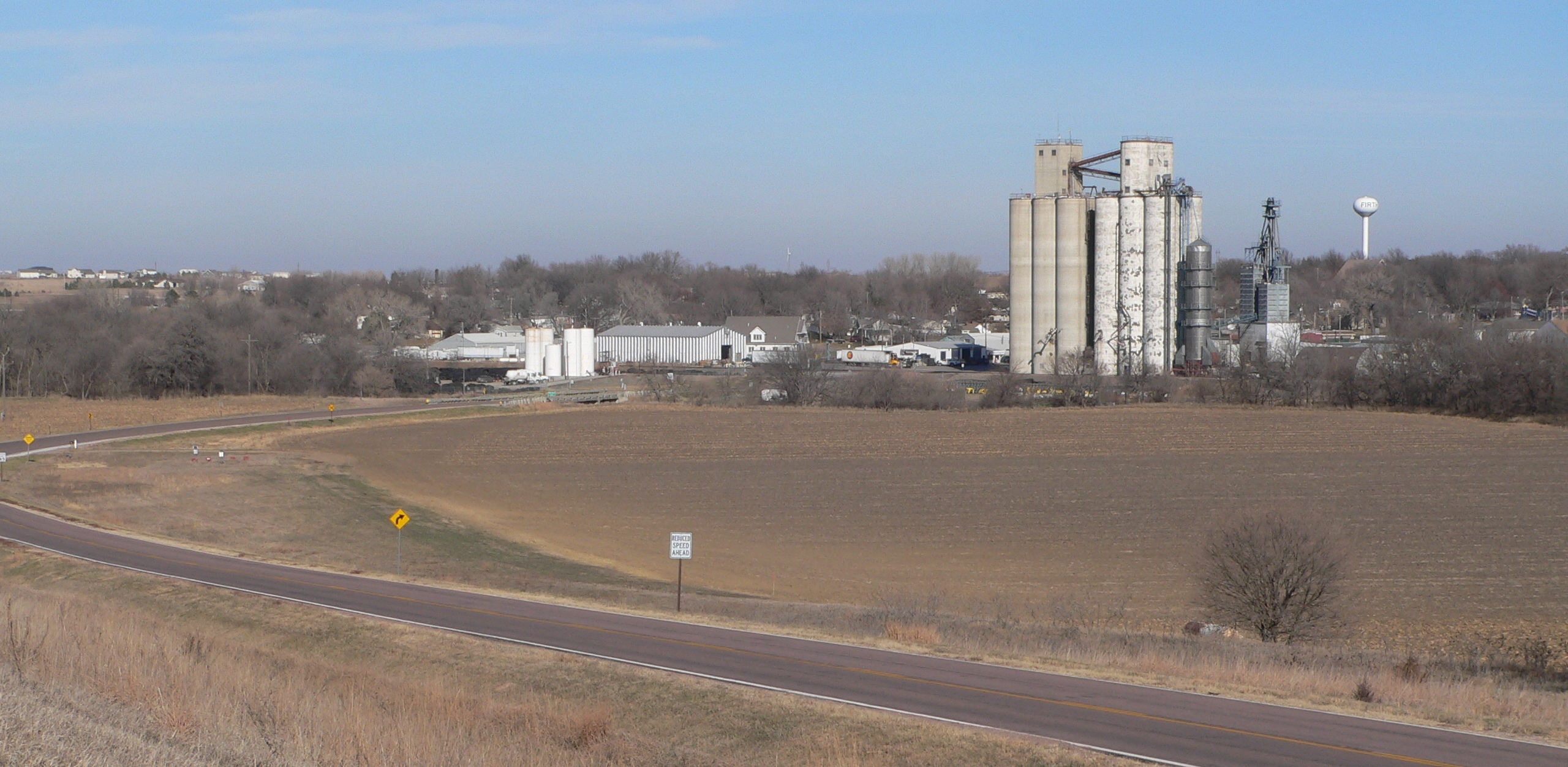
- Firth, seen from the southwest.

- Location of Firth, Nebraska
- Coordinates: 40°32′10″N 96°36′16″W
- Country: United States
- State: Nebraska
- County: Lancaster
- Township: South Pass

Area
  - Total: 0.36 sq mi (0.92 km^{2})
  - Land: 0.36 sq mi (0.92 km^{2})
  - Water: 0 sq mi (0.00 km^{2})
- Elevation: 1,355 ft (413 m)

Population (2020)
  - Total: 649
  - Density: 1,836.2/sq mi (708.98/km^{2})
- Time zone: UTC-6 (Central (CST))
  - Summer (DST): UTC-5 (CDT)
- ZIP code: 68358
- Area code: 402
- FIPS code: 31-16935
- GNIS feature ID: 2398879
- Website: http://www.firth.nebraska.gov

Firth is a village in Lancaster County, Nebraska, United States. It is part of the Lincoln, Nebraska Metropolitan Statistical Area. The population was 649 at the 2020 census.

== Geography ==
According to the United States Census Bureau, the village has a total area of 0.28 square miles (0.73 km^{2}), all land. Located in South Pass Township, which is now used as a county precinct, Firth is the southernmost community in Lancaster County. Firth is bordered to the east by Big Nemaha Reservoir.

== Demographics ==
Historical population
Census	Pop.	Note	%±
1880	230		—
1890	259		12.6%
1900	307		18.5%
1910	343		11.7%
1920	332		−3.2%
1930	322		−3.0%
1940	323		0.3%
1950	245		−24.1%
1960	277		13.1%
1970	328		18.4%
1980	384		17.1%
1990	471		22.7%
2000	564		19.7%
2010	590		4.6%
2020	649		10.0%
U.S. Decennial Census

=== 2010 census ===
As of the census of 2010, there were 590 people, 204 households, and 147 families living in the village. The population density was 2,107.1 inhabitants per square mile (813.6/km^{2}). There were 218 housing units at an average density of 778.6 units per square mile (300.6 units/km^{2}). The racial makeup of the village was 89.8% White, 0.2% African American, 1.2% Native American, 0.7% Asian, 6.8% from other races, and 1.4% from two or more races. Hispanic or Latino of any race were 9.0% of the population.

There were 204 households, of which 45.6% had children under the age of 18 living with them, 58.8% were married couples living together, 9.3% had a female householder with no husband present, 3.9% had a male householder with no wife present, and 27.9% were non-families. 23.5% of all households were made up of individuals, and 13.3% had someone living alone who was 65 years of age or older. The average household size was 2.73 and the average family size was 3.31.

The median age in the village was 34.2 years. 32.2% of residents were under the age of 18; 4.9% were between the ages of 18 and 24; 28.9% were from 25 to 44; 15.6% were from 45 to 64; and 18.3% were 65 years of age or older. The gender makeup of the village was 51.4% male and 48.6% female.

=== 2000 census ===
As of the census of 2000, there were 564 people, 192 households, and 139 families living in the village. The population density was 1,852.5 inhabitants per square mile (715.3/km^{2}). There were 200 housing units at an average density of 656.9 units per square mile (253.6 units/km^{2}). The racial makeup of the village was 98.76% White, 0.18% African American, 0.35% Native American, 0.18% Asian, 0.18% from other races, and 0.35% from two or more races. Hispanic or Latino of any race were 0.18% of the population.

There were 192 households, out of which 41.1% had children under the age of 18 living with them, 64.6% were married couples living together, 6.3% had a female householder with no husband present, and 27.1% were non-families. 22.9% of all households were made up of individuals, and 13.0% had someone living alone who was 65 years of age or older. The average household size was 2.67 and the average family size was 3.15.

In the village, the population was spread out, with 26.8% under the age of 18, 7.3% from 18 to 24, 30.3% from 25 to 44, 11.2% from 45 to 64, and 24.5% who were 65 years of age or older. The median age was 35 years. For every 100 females, there were 91.2 males. For every 100 females age 18 and over, there were 91.2 males.

As of 2000 the median income for a household in the village was $41,944, and the median income for a family was $52,083. Males had a median income of $34,375 versus $24,875 for females. The per capita income for the village was $20,471. About 5.6% of families and 6.4% of the population were below the poverty line, including 10.7% of those under age 18 and 13.8% of those age 65 or over.

== Schools ==
Norris School District 160 is located approximately two miles north and one mile west of Firth. Norris is made up of an elementary school, intermediate school, middle school, and a high school, all of which are in separate buildings but on the same campus. Norris provides Pre-K-12 education for students from Hickman, Holland, Firth, Cortland, Roca, Princeton, Panama, and parts of southern Lincoln. Norris School was named after a United States senator from Nebraska, George William Norris.

== History ==
A courthouse square was planned in the area that would become Firth sometime before 1860. However, due to Firth's remote location, residents would have had to travel to Nebraska City for supplies, meaning that the area remained largely uninhabited by non-Natives for many years. Firth was settled in the early 1870s, as the Atchison & Nebraska Railroad was extended toward Lincoln. The post office was established in 1872, named for Superintendent Frank Firth of the Atchison & Nebraska Railroad, and was incorporated in 1879.

Once the railroad was completed, Firth became an important hub of business on the Atchison & Nebraska line, shipping 700 carloads of grain and livestock daily. In 1916, a brick school was built to replace the two-story schoolhouse which had previously served the village. In 1964, Firth became one of several schools to consolidate and form the Norris School District. The brick school building was torn down in 1971 after years of vacancy. Fundraising in the area allowed for the Lakeview Rest Home to be built in the 1970s on land donated by Henry and Bertha TeKolste.

== Notable person ==
Orah Dee Clark, the first superintendent of Alaska schools, was born in Firth.
