= Miocene Ditch =

Coordinates: 64.738201°N 165.308889°W

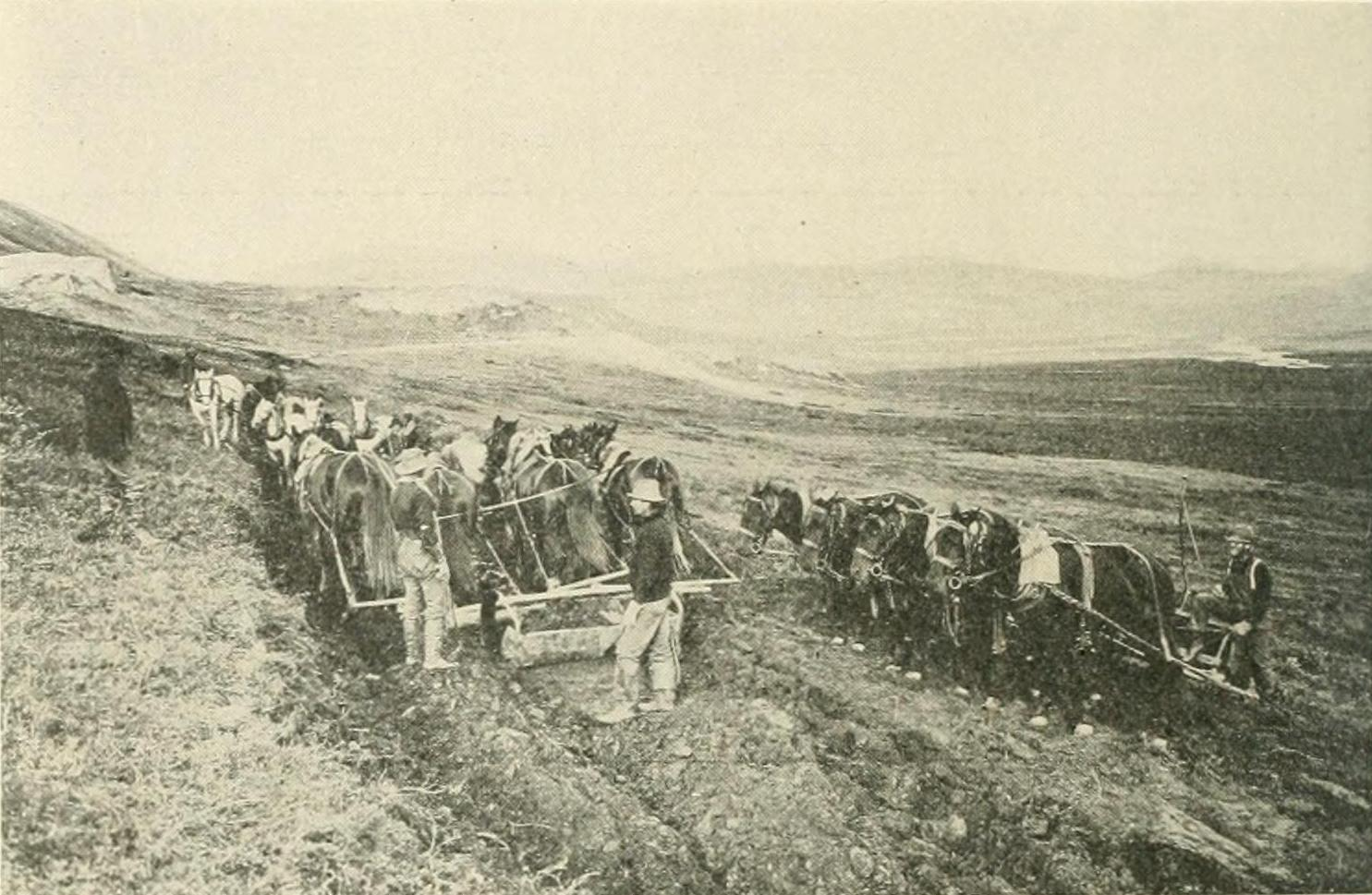
The Miocene Ditch.

The Miocene Ditch is one of three historic ditches along the west side of the Nome River, on the Seward Peninsula, Alaska. It and the other two, the Seward and Pioneer ditches, were built to provide water to early placer mining operations near Nome. The Miocene is the oldest and longest of the three ditches, and the highest in elevation. From suitable places along the Nome-Taylor Road the ditches form distinct parallel lines crossing tundra promontories west of the river.

The ditch begins on the Nome River near the confluence with Buffalo Creek. As recently as the mid-1990s, there was a substantial head gate visible at the upper end of the ditch (Smith 1997:cover photo). There is some difference of opinion regarding the precise length of the ditch. Purington puts the length of the ditch and its laterals at 54 miles (1905:124). Four years later, the length is stated to be 62 miles (Harrison 1909:553). On the north side of King Mountain, the ditch forks, carrying water to mines in both the Snake and Nome River drainages. The upper and lower sections of the ditch were built to be 8 feet wide at the bottom and 11 feet wide at the top, while the middle section was ten feet wide at the bottom and 14 feet at the top. It was designed to carry about 28,500 gallons per minute (Purington 1905:124).

Construction on the ditch began in 1901, making it the first major water conduit on the Seward Peninsula. It was conceived and built by W. L. Leland and J. M. Davidson. Major extensions in 1902 and 1903 lengthened the ditch to what appears to be its current length (Brooks 1908:29-33). In the period between 1910 and 1912 the ditch was widened using steam shovels, and two large tunnels were excavated to avoid problem areas (Daily Nome Industrial Worker 1911).

Horse-drawn plows and graders, along with gangs of men constructed the ditch. Once the ditch line was surveyed, plows were used to break up the soil, then graders cast the loosened soil to the downhill side of the ditch, building a large berm. When the graders finished, men with shovels leveled the bottom of the canal and that concluded basic construction. Construction crews consisted of 60 to 70 men and between 50 and 100 horses. There were problem areas, of course, where additional construction methods had to be applied. These included areas of permafrost, rocky outcrops where stonework was necessary to support the ditch, and the need to cross several creeks tributary to Nome River. To seal the bottom of the canal through permafrost and rocky locations, clay was hauled in small boats and dumped into the ditch. Originally, two inverted syphons were constructed to cross Manila and Dorothy creeks (Purington 1905:123-126).

Water from the Miocene Ditch was crucial for mining placer gold deposits in important creeks near Nome. It was used on Anvil Creek, in the Snake River drainage, and on Dexter Creek, a tributary of the Nome River. At least in the early years, mining on Dexter Creek was highly dependent on this water (Nome Nugget 1902; Nome News 1903).

In general, the working season of the ditch was from late June to early to mid-October (Henshaw 1908:279). Considerable work was required to get the ditch ready each season, and a small force maintained the ditch during the operating season (Purington 1905:126).

In 1987 the company that held the Miocene Ditch right-of-way across federal lands applied to relinquish the right-of-way. In response to this, the federal Bureau of Land Management conducted historical research and on-the-ground inventory of the Miocene Ditch and other water conduits in the area, and in 1990 the Miocene Ditch was determined to be eligible for the National Register of Historic Places.
