= Nenana City School District =

School district in Alaska, United States

Coordinates: 64°32′17″N 149°05′06″W

Address
- 406 East Second Street Nenana, Alaska, 99760; United States

District information
- Type: Public
- Grades: Pre-K–12
- NCES District ID: 0200540

Students and staff
- Students: 2,279
- Teachers: 27.32
- Staff: 59.5
- Student–teacher ratio: 83.42

Other information
- Website: www.nenanalynx.org

Nenana City School District (NCSD) is a school district in Nenana, Alaska.

It operates one public school, the Nenana City School (NCS), which has 179 students as of 2017–2018. Some students live in the Nenana Student Living Center, the district's boarding facility. The district also runs CyberLynx Correspondence Program.

== Boarding house ==
The Nenana Student Living Center (NSLC) is a boarding home for high school students (grades 9–12) operated by the NCSD. As of 2018, it houses about 77 students who originate from various parts of Alaska. It is one of three in the state of Alaska. The students attend the regular Nenana City School and are not segregated in a separate education program. The center's students make up about 70% of the high school's enrollment.
