= Frederick Mears =

American Army officer and engineer (1878-1939)

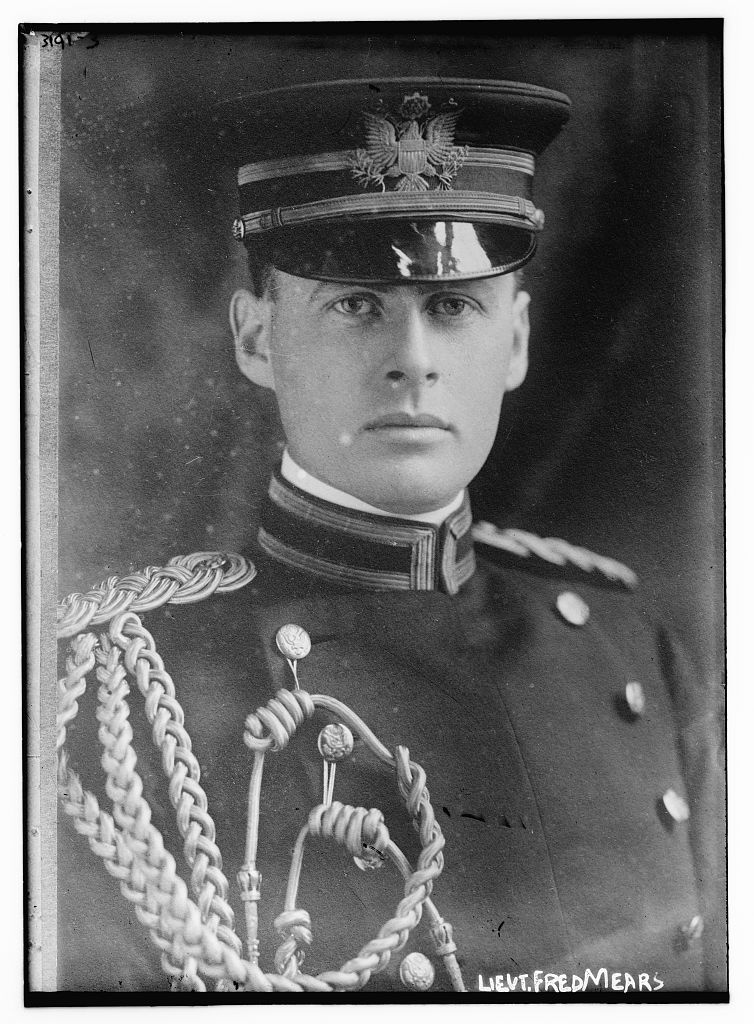
- Fredrick Mears circa 1919.
- Born: Frederick Mears; May 25, 1878; Omaha Barracks Hospital, Nebraska
- Died: January 11, 1939; Seattle, Washington
- Occupation: Civil Engineer
- Known for: Railroads, bridges, Fort Mears
- Spouse: Jennie “Jane” Wainwright
- Children: Frederick Mears III
- Parent: Lt. Col Frederick Mears Sr.
- Relatives: Major Edward C. Mears

Colonel Frederick Mears (May 5, 1878 – January 11, 1939) was an American military officer in the US Army and railroad engineer and executive. He was the son of a career army officer and his brother Major Edward C. Mears was also in the US army. Mears was principal engineer of the Alaska Railroad. Mears took advanced engineering courses at the Infantry and Cavalry School, located at Fort Leavenworth, Kansas and became a cavalry officer in the US Army.

== Panama Canal ==
In May 1906, Mears went to work relocating portions of the Panama Railroad. In 1907, Mears received a promotion to first lieutenant. That same year he married Jennifer (also known as Jennie, Jane, or Johnnie) Wainwright at Fort Clark, Texas. having been next in authority to General Goethals in the work of constructing the canal. Together they went back to Panama and started their family.

== Alaska Railroad ==
In April 1914, President Woodrow Wilson appointed Mears to the Alaska Engineering Commission. With Mears’s help Ship Creek’s tent city was moved and transformed in the town of Anchorage with 4,000 permanent residents.

== World War I ==
When World War I broke out, Mears left Alaska and returned to Leavenworth where he organized and took command of the United States Army Thirty-first Railway Engineers regiment. He then went on to France to build the railroad system for the Allied forces. After World War I, Colonel Mears and his family returned to Alaska; he was appointed Chief Engineer to help complete the railroad.

== Leaving Army and Alaska ==
On July 7, 1923, Colonel Mears resigned from the army and the Alaska Engineering Commission and, with his family, left Anchorage for Seattle to start with the Great Northern Railroad. In civilian life Frederick Mears continued his association with the Great Northern Railroad. His crowning achievement as an engineer and project manager was the Great Northern Railroad Cascade Tunnel under Stevens Pass in Washington State. The 7.9-mile-long tunnel was completed in 36 months and the dedication on January 12, 1929, was a nationwide radio media event. The event was broadcast over a coast-to-coast network of NBC stations – a radio network established on December 28, just two weeks prior to the Cascade Tunnel broadcast. Colonel Mears died on January 11, 1939, at the age of 60 at Seattle, Washington, from pneumonia. He is buried at Fort Lawton Cemetery, now part of Discovery Park in Seattle.

== Early life ==
He spent virtually all of his formative years immersed in army life as his father spent 31 years in the military. At 15 years old, Mears enrolled at Shattuck Military Academy, Faribault, Minnesota, the same institution his father had attended. Upon graduating from Shattuck in 1897, Mears wanted to continue his father’s tradition by becoming a cavalry officer in the US Army.

== Legacy ==
The US Army honored Frederick Mears’ service in Alaska by dedicating one of its posts in his memory during World War II. Fort Mears was built on Dutch Harbor in the Aleutian Islands during the summer of 1941. At its peak, the number of troops stationed at Fort Mears reached 10,000 people. tribute to Colonel Mears can be found at the site of the Tanana River Bridge on the Alaska Railroad which when built under the management of Col Mears was the longest single span bridge in North America at 702 ft. The bridge is known as the Mears Memorial Bridge. Mrs. Frederick Mears, on September 16, 1915 organized the Anchorage Woman's Club specifically to raise funds for a new school in Anchorage. For this and other civic leadership, Jane Mears Middle School was named in her honor. His son Frederick Mears III was born on Christmas Day 1915. He later attended Yale and joined the navy as pilot in Guadalcanal and other Pacific Battles.

His son Frederick Mears III was a pilot in the US Army Air Corps and was awarded the Distinguished Flying Cross. Mears III died June 26, 1943.
