= Mears Memorial Bridge =

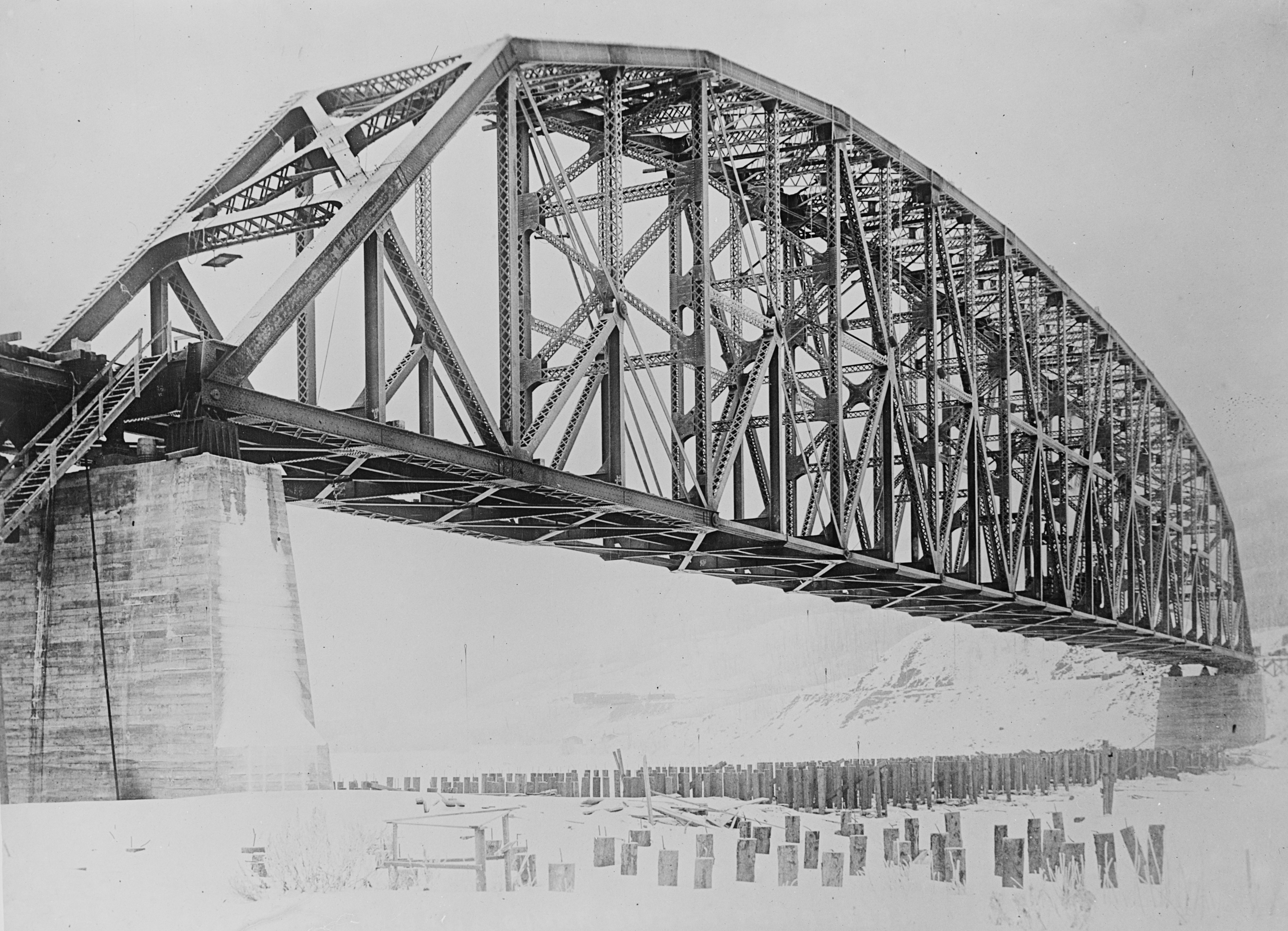
- View of bridge shortly after completion in 1923
- Coordinates: 64.5670978°N 149.0786362°W
- Carries: Single track of Alaska Railroad
- Crosses: Tanana River
- Locale: Nenana, Alaska
- Owner: Alaska Railroad

Characteristics
- Design: Simple truss bridge (Pennsylvania through truss)
- Material: Steel
- Longest span: 700 feet (210 m)

History
- Designer: Modjeski and Angier
- Constructed by: American Bridge Company
- Opened: February 1923

The Mears Memorial Bridge is a truss bridge on the Alaska Railroad, completed in 1923. The bridge spans the Tanana River at Nenana and at 700-foot-long (210 m), it is among the largest simple truss-type bridges in the world.

== History ==
The bridge's namesake, Colonel Frederick Mears, was chairman and chief engineer of the Alaska Engineering Commission, the railroad's builder and original operator.

The bridge was the final link in the railroad, entering service in February 1923, a year after the rest of the 470 miles (760 km) line was finished. The AEC hired the Chicago firm of Ralph Modjeski and Angier to design the bridge, and the American Bridge Company to fabricate and erect it. When completed, this 700-foot-long (210 m) Pennsylvania through-truss bridge was the longest truss span in the United States and its territories.

This bridge still ranks as the longest span of any kind in Alaska. As of 1999 it was then the third-longest simple truss bridge in North America.

President Warren G. Harding, becoming the first president to visit Alaska, traveled to the state to drive the ceremonial last spike at the north end of the bridge on July 15, 1923. It was one of Harding's last public appearances, as he died 18 days later during his ongoing western tour.

== See also ==
- Juneau–Douglas Bridge, next longest span in Alaska
