= Nenana Municipal Airport =

Coordinates: 64°32′50.28″N 149°4′26.41″W

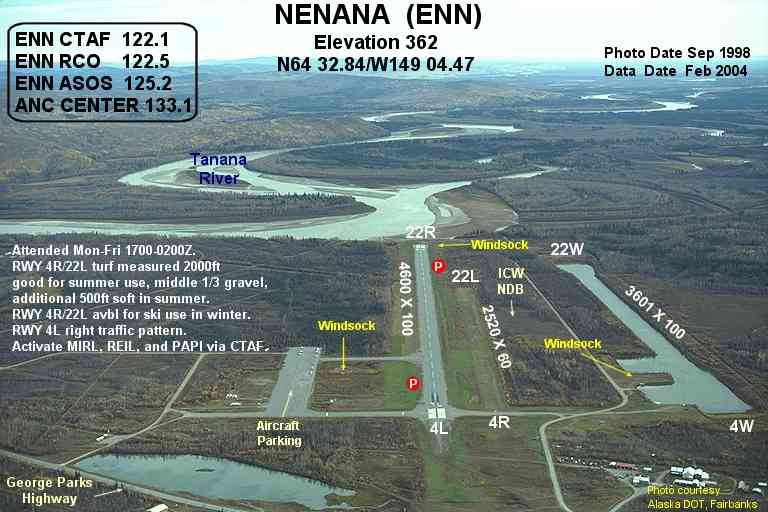
- IATA: ENN; ICAO: PANN; FAA LID: ENN; WMO: 70260

Summary
- Airport type: Public
- Owner: City of Nenana
- Location: Nenana, Alaska
- Elevation AMSL: 362 ft / 110 m

Map
- Location of airport in Alaska

Runways
Direction	Length		Surface
Direction	ft	m	Surface
4L/22R	4,600	1,402	Asphalt
4R/22L	2,520	768	Turf
4W/22W	3,601	1,098	Water

Statistics (2005)
- Aircraft operations: 6,000
- Based aircraft: 15
- Source: Federal Aviation Administration

Nenana Municipal Airport (IATA: ENN, ICAO: PANN, FAA LID: ENN) is a city-owned public-use airport located one mile (1.6 km) south of the central business district of Nenana, a city in the Yukon-Koyukuk Census Area of the U.S. state of Alaska.

== Facilities and aircraft ==
Nenana Municipal Airport covers 1,030 acres (420 ha) which contains two runways: 4L/22R with a 4,600 x 100 ft (1,402 x 30 m) asphalt pavement and 4R/22L with a 2,520 x 60 ft (768 x 18 m) turf surface. It also has a seaplane landing area designated 4W/22W which measures 3,601 x 100 ft (1,098 x 30 m).

For 12-month period ending December 31, 2005, the airport had 6,000 aircraft operations, an average of 16 per day: 58% general aviation and 42% air taxi. There are 15 aircraft based at this airport: 93% single engine and 7% multi-engine.

== See also ==
- List of airports in Alaska
