= Chatanika River =

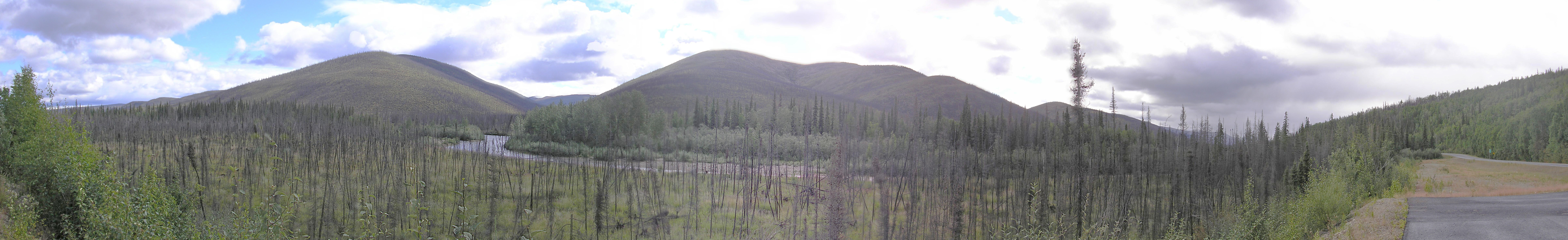
- Chatanika River panorama

- Location of the mouth of the Chatanika River in Alaska
- Native name: Ch'edenano' (Lower Tanana)

Location
- Country: United States
- State: Alaska
- District: Fairbanks North Star Borough, Yukon–Koyukuk Census Area

Physical characteristics
- Source: confluence of McManus and Smith creeks
  - location: Yukon–Tanana Uplands, Fairbanks North Star Borough
  - coordinates: 65°17′28″N 146°20′38″W
  - elevation: 1,569 ft (478 m)
- Mouth: Tolovana River
  - location: 48 miles (77 km) northwest of Fairbanks, Yukon–Koyukuk Census Area
  - coordinates: 65°04′36″N 149°16′38″W
  - elevation: 302 ft (92 m)
- Length: 128 mi (206 km)

The Chatanika River /ˌtʃætəˈniːkə/ (Lower Tanana: Ch'edenano) is a 128-mile (206 km) tributary of the Tolovana River in the U.S. state of Alaska. The Chatanika River is a clear or lightly tannic stained rapid-runoff stream that has its headwaters in the White Mountains and flows westward through valleys between summits and uplands for about four-fifths of its length before it enters Minto Flats. Once in the flats—a marshy area in which multiple streams, rivers, and lakes are located— the Chatanika joins the Tolovana, which flows into the Tanana River and on to the Yukon River. The Chatanika is thus a portion of the Yukon River drainage basin.

During the first portion of the 20th century, the Chatanika was dominated by the gold-mining industry, which used its flow to operate gold dredges. The most visible example of this was the construction of the Davidson Ditch, a dam-and-pipeline system used to divert water to gold-mining operations closer to Fairbanks. The Ditch was abandoned in the 1950s, and during the 1967 Tanana Valley flood, the dam was damaged and became inoperable. In January 2002, the Alaska Department of Fish and Game and the United States Fish and Wildlife Service removed the dam in conjunction with other groups, restoring the Chatanika's original flow. Today, the upper Chatanika is a moderately popular rafting and fishing destination, and vacation cabins have been built at spots along its banks.

Chatanika, Alaska, located near the river, shares its name with the river.

The river contains Arctic grayling, Arctic lamprey, burbot, chum salmon, humpback whitefish, king salmon, least cisco, longnose suckers, northern pike, sheefish, and slimy sculpins.

== Boating ==
Boaters can float the Chatanika River in many kinds of non-motorized watercraft. The Elliott Highway, which crosses the river below the village of Chatanika, and the Steese Highway, which parallels the river further upstream, offer multiple places to begin and end boating trips. Several public campgrounds and waysides along these highways afford access to the river. The entire river is rated Class I (easy) on the International Scale of River Difficulty. Dangers include logjams and overhanging trees and stumps.

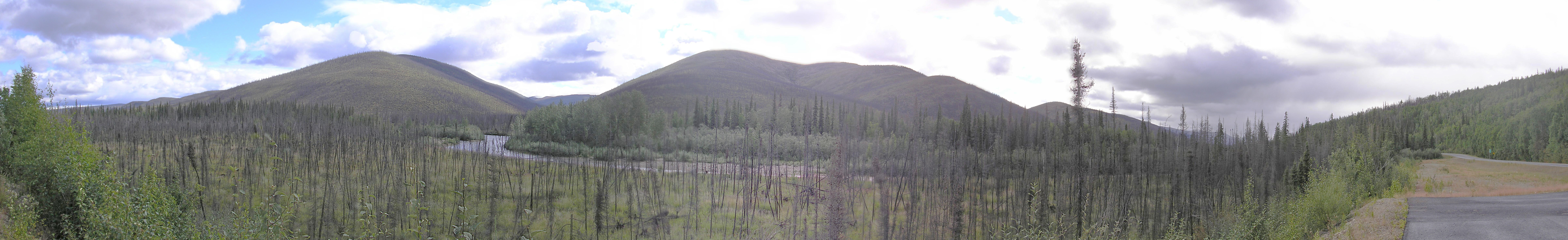
The Chatanika River, as seen from the Steese Highway, northeast of Fairbanks, Alaska.

== Parks ==
The Upper Chatanika River State Recreation Site is at mile 39 of the Steese Highway. It is a relatively small park at 73 acres (30 ha). There is a campground, boat launch and access road to a gravel bar on the river for various recreational activities. The gravel bar is susceptible to flooding during rainy periods.

The Lower Chatanika River State Recreation Area is a 400 acres (160 ha) park at mile 11 of the Elliott Highway. It has two small campgrounds, picnic areas, river access, and a stocked fishing pond. The two parks are situated such that one can put in a canoe or other small boat at the upper and paddle to the lower in a day.

The Davidson Ditch Historic Site is the remains of the Davidson Ditch operation, preserved by the Bureau of Land Management.

== See also ==
- List of rivers of Alaska
- Fairbanks North Star Borough
