= Anchorage Woman's Club =

Women's club in Alaska, US

Anchorage Woman’s Club
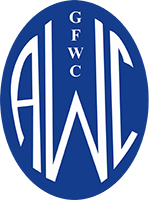
- Formation: 1915
- Founded at: Anchorage, Alaska
- Type: Woman's club
- Website: gfwcanchoragewomansclub.com

The Anchorage Woman’s Club (AWC) is a woman's club founded in 1915. It was instrumental in organizing the construction of the first schoolhouse in Anchorage.

== History ==
Mrs. Fredrick Mears and other women organized the Anchorage Woman’s Club in 1915 with the specific goal of establishing a school for the children of the workers building the Alaska Railroad. The women were successful in building the Pioneer School House, the first schoolhouse in Anchorage.

The AWC is a member of the General Federation of Women’s Clubs. It is community service organization with programs in Arts, Conservation, Education, Home Life, International Outreach, and Public Issues.

== Activities ==
In 1964 the AWC worked to preserve the Pioneer School House after it survived an earthquake. The building was moved eleven blocks and set on a cinder block foundation.

The AWC continues to manage the Pioneer School House, now owned by the city of Anchorage listed on the U.S. National Register of Historic Places. It is facilitating renovations following the structure's centennial in 2015.
