= Chatanika, Alaska =

Unincorporated community in the state of Alaska, United States

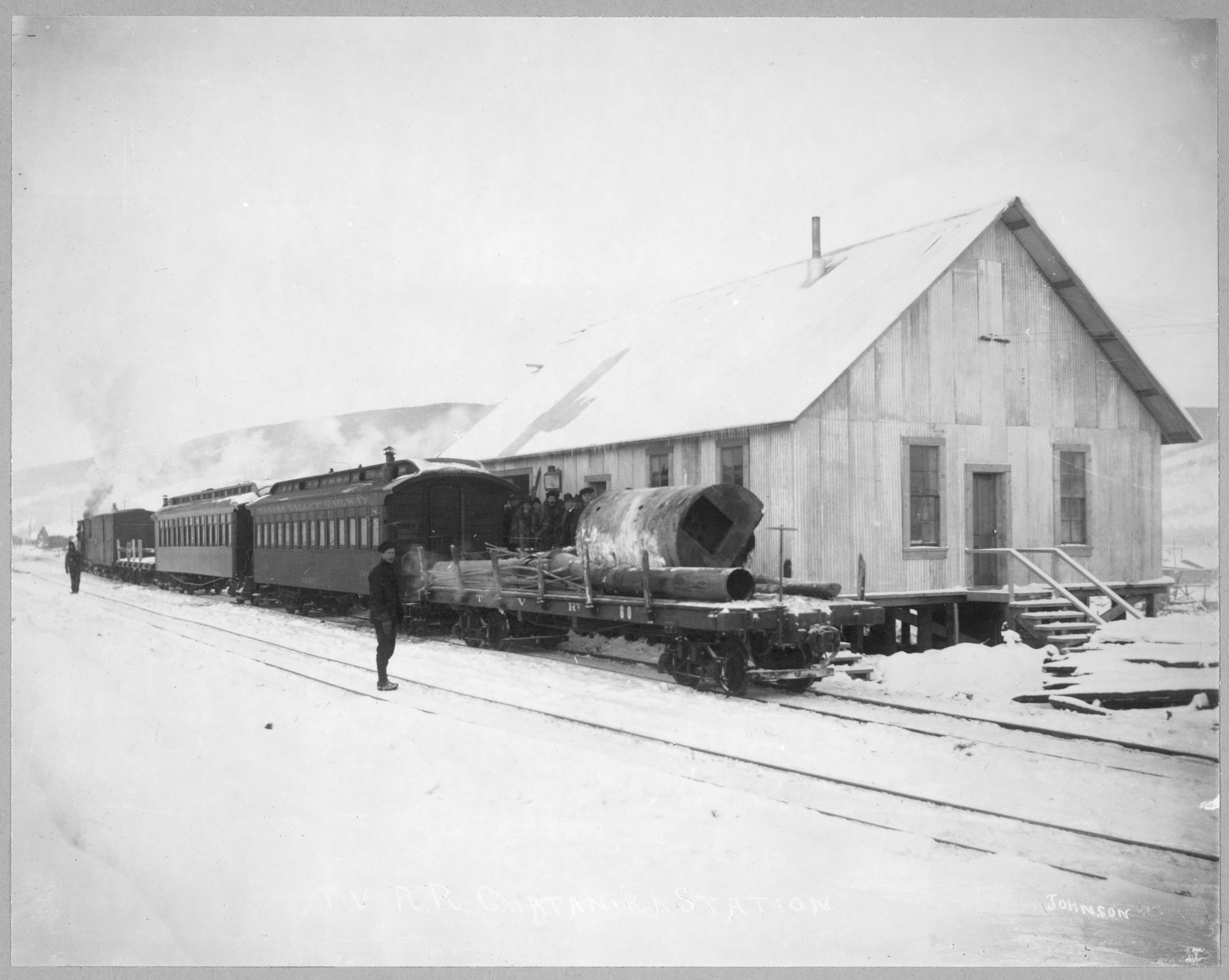
- Train of the Tanana Valley Railroad at the station in Chatanika, Alaska, 1916

- Location in the U.S. state of Alaska
- Coordinates (USGS GNIS 1400167): 65°06′44″N 147°28′38″W
- Country: United States
- State: Alaska
- Borough: Fairbanks North Star
- Township: T N R W Meridian
- Settled: 1904
- Named for: Chatanika River

Government
  - Borough mayor: Bryce J. Ward
  - State senator: Click Bishop (R)
  - State rep.: Dave Talerico (R)
- Elevation: 896 ft (273 m)
- Time zone: UTC-9 (Alaska (AKST))
  - Summer (DST): UTC-8 (AKDT)
- ZIP code: 99712
- Area code: 907 (local exchange phones use the 389 prefix)
- FIPS code: 02-12460
- GNIS feature ID: 1400167

Chatanika /ˌtʃætəˈniːkə/ is a small unincorporated community located in the Fairbanks North Star Borough, Alaska, United States, north-northeast of the city of Fairbanks. The community runs along an approximately 20-mile (32 km) stretch of the Steese Highway, the majority of which sees the highway paralleled by the Chatanika River. The community consists of sparsely scattered residential subdivisions, several roadside businesses, a boat launch where the Steese Highway crosses the Chatanika River, relics of past gold mining operations in the area and the Poker Flat Research Range operated by the Geophysical Institute of the University of Alaska Fairbanks.

Chatanika was one of over a dozen small communities in the vicinity of Fairbanks whose prosperity was tied to gold mining during the Fairbanks Gold Rush. Chatanika, as the northern terminus of the narrow-gauge Tanana Valley Railroad, also owed much of its early prosperity to railroad operations, which were closely tied to the mining activity. Chatanika, along with Fox, are the only two of the numerous communities in the hills immediately north of Fairbanks which has managed to remain populated and maintain a distinct community identity.

== History ==
A mining settlement established about 1904, it received a railroad station when the Tanana Valley Railroad was completed in 1907. The Chatanika post office was established in 1908.

== Demographics ==
Historical population
Census	Pop.	Note	%±
1910	193		—
1930	63		—
1940	106		68.3%
U.S. Decennial Census

Chatanika first appeared on the 1910 U.S. Census as an unincorporated village. It did not appear on the 1920 census. It appeared again in 1930 as Chatanika River, but the name was restored to Chatanika in 1940. That was the last time it appeared on the census to date (as of 2010).

=== Etymology ===
The community was named after the Chatanika River.

== Geography ==
Located 2 miles (3.2 km) east of the confluence of Cleary Creek and the Chatanika River, Chatanika lies 20 miles (32 km) northeast of Fairbanks. Its altitude is 896 feet (273 m).

== Gold dredge ==
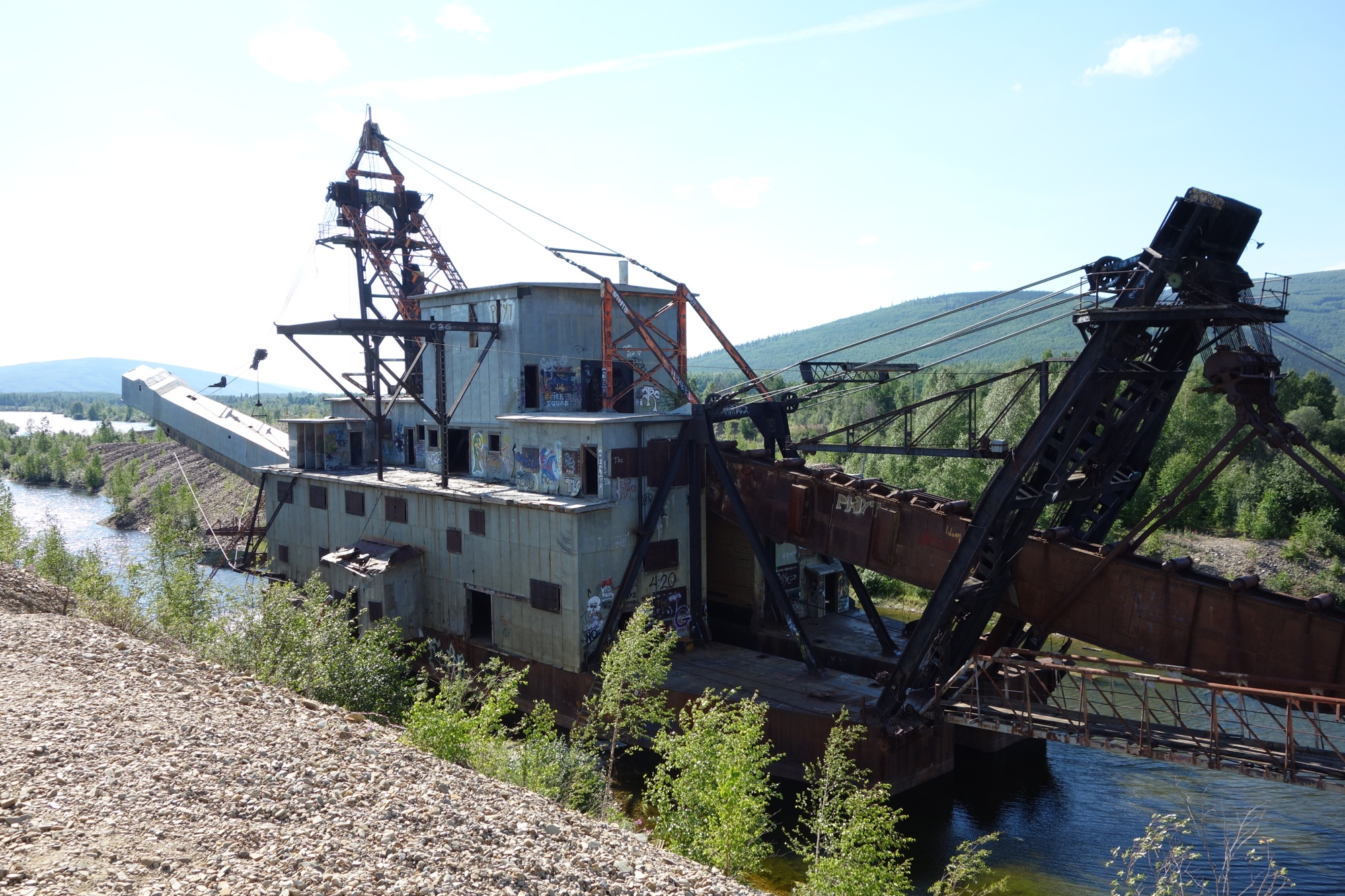
Gold mining dredge in Chatanika, Alaska

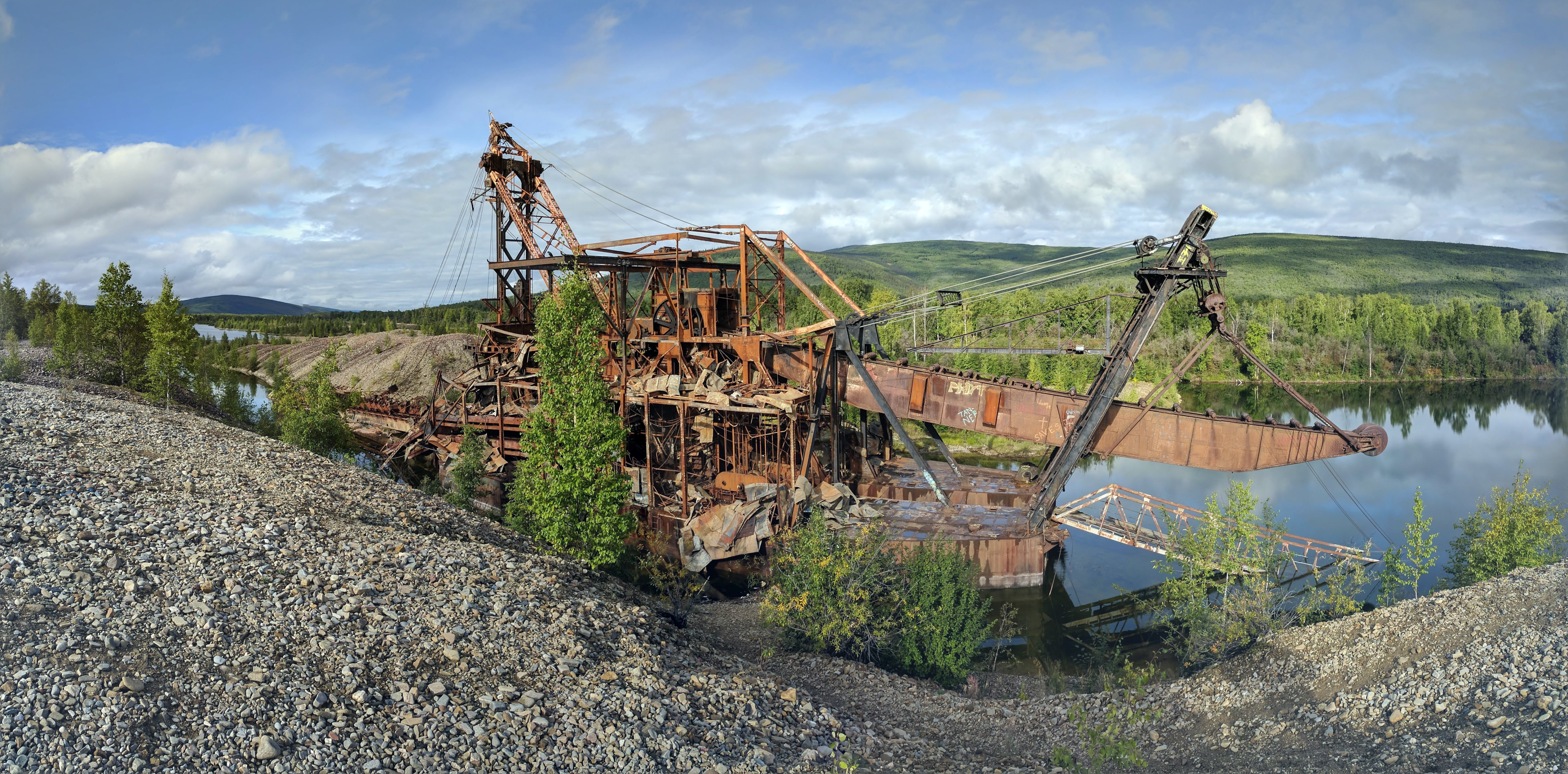
The dredge in 2017, after the fire

The Chatanika gold dredge was a historic relic of gold dredge #3 owned and operated by F.E. Company between 1928 and 1958. The dredge is located at about 27.5 miles (44.3 km) along the Steese Highway east of Fairbanks in a 60 acres (24 ha) pond it dug itself, directly across the road from the Chatanika Lodge. The dredge was private property and off-limits to the public. In August 2013 an accidental fire destroyed the dredge.
