= Nenana, Alaska =

Nenana Toghotili
- City
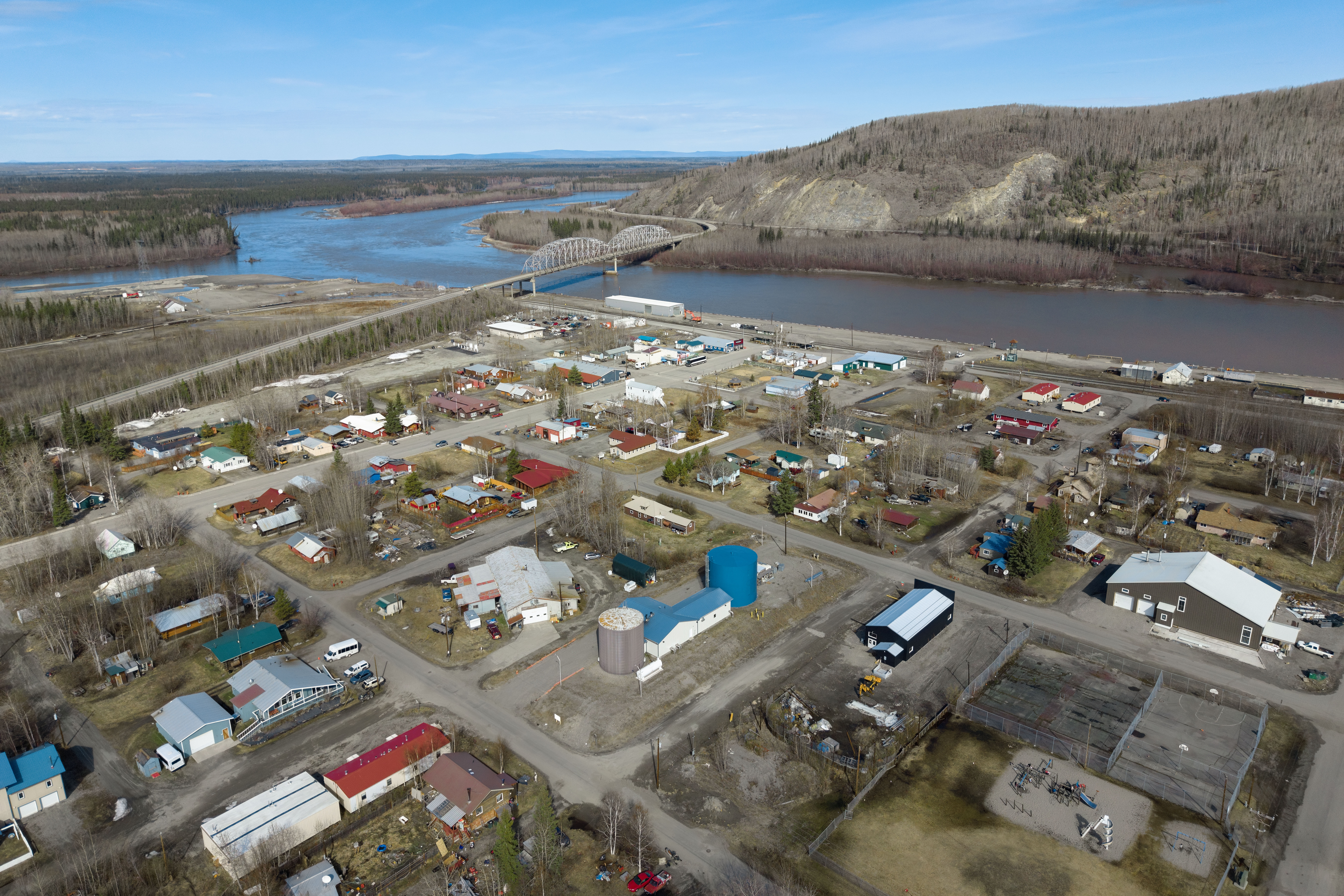
- Downtown (2026)

- Location in Alaska
- Coordinates: 64°33′29″N 149°5′26″W
- Country: United States
- State: Alaska
- Census Area: Yukon-Koyukuk
- Incorporated: November 17, 1921

Government
  - Mayor: Joshua K Verhagen
  - State senator: Mike Cronk (R)
  - State rep.: Rebecca Schwanke (R)

Area
  - Total: 6.25 sq mi (16.18 km^{2})
  - Land: 5.95 sq mi (15.42 km^{2})
  - Water: 0.29 sq mi (0.76 km^{2})
- Elevation: 351 ft (107 m)

Population (2020)
  - Total: 358
  - Density: 60.1/sq mi (23.22/km^{2})
- Time zone: UTC-9 (Alaska (AKST))
  - Summer (DST): UTC-8 (AKDT)
- ZIP code: 99760
- Area code: 907
- FIPS code: 02-53050
- GNIS feature ID: 1406940

Nenana /nɛˈnænə/ (Lower Tanana: Toghotili) is a home rule city in the Yukon-Koyukuk Census Area of the Unorganized Borough in Interior Alaska. Nenana developed as a Lower Tanana community at the confluence where the tributary Nenana River enters the Tanana. As of the 2020 census, Nenana had a population of 358.

Completed in 1923, the 700-foot-long (210 m) Mears Memorial Bridge was built over the Tanana River as part of the territory's railroad project connecting Anchorage and Fairbanks.

== History and culture ==
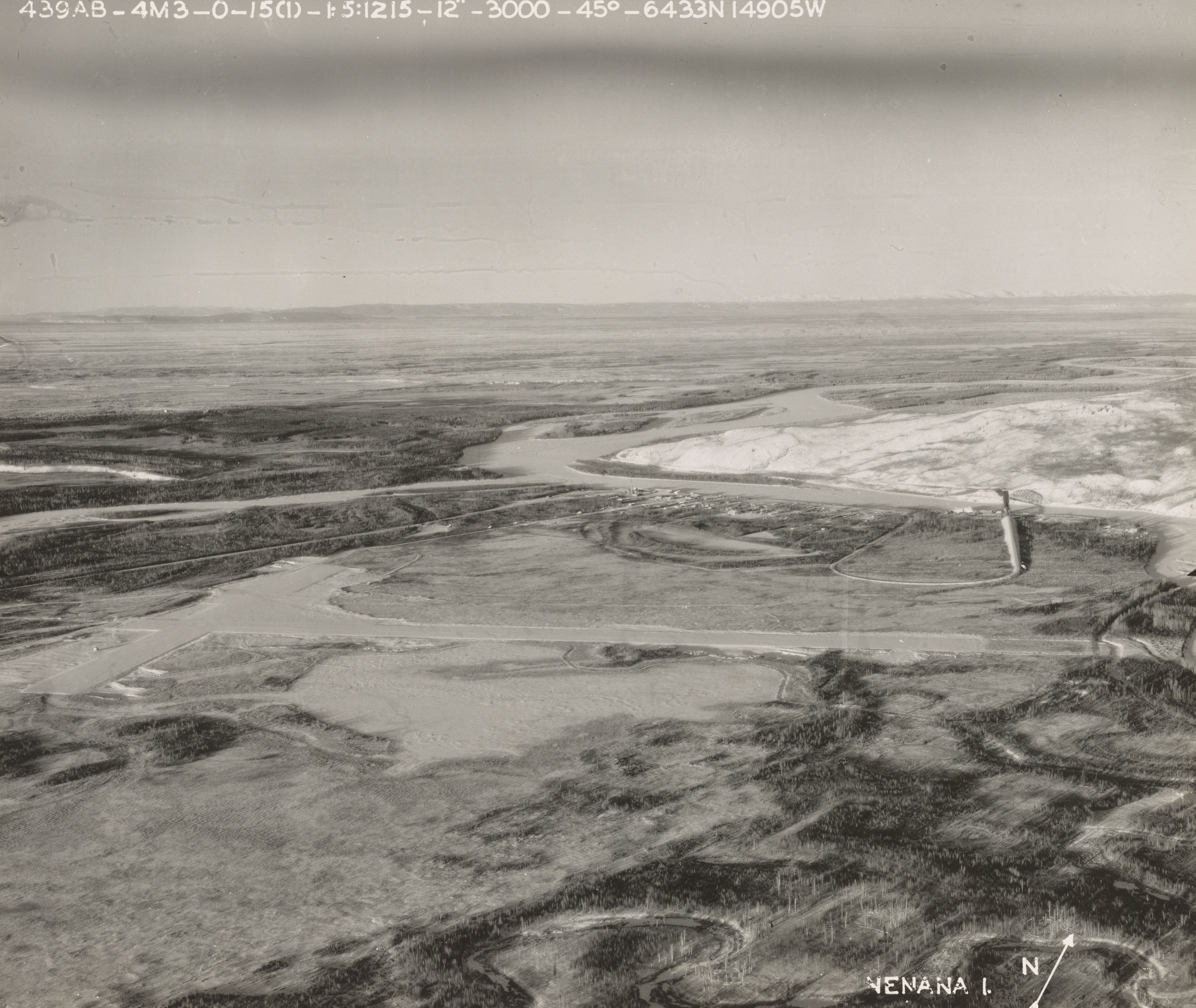
Nenana, 1944

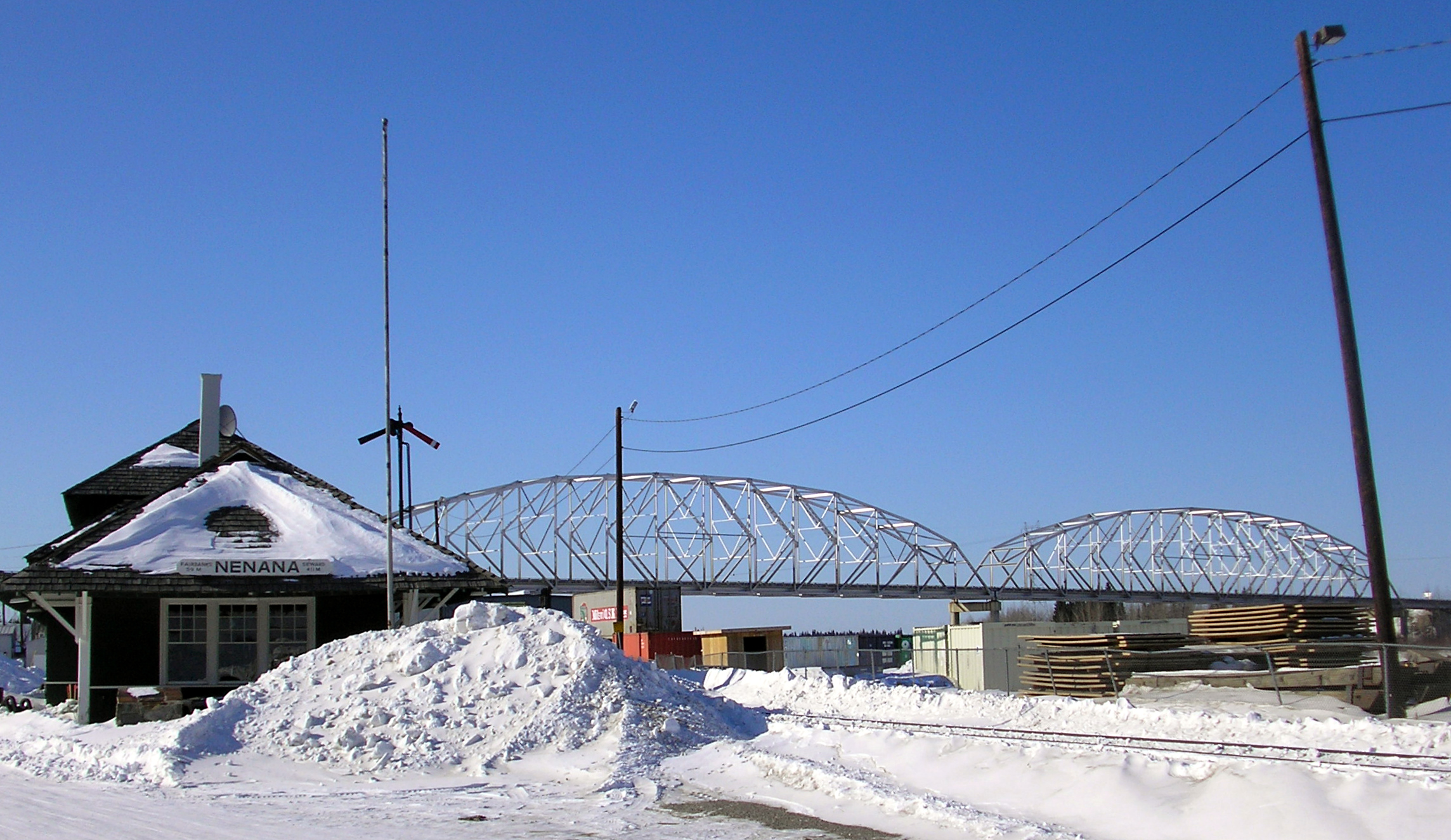
Nenana train station and Parks Highway bridge

Nenana is in the westernmost portion of Tanana territory. (The Tanana are among the large Dené language family, also known as Athabascan.) The town was first known by European Americans as Tortella, a transliteration of the Indian word Toghotthele, which means "mountain that parallels the river." It was later named for the river and the Nenana people who live nearby. The Nenana people became accustomed to contact with Europeans, due to trading journeys to the Village of Tanana, where Russians bartered Western goods for furs from 1838.

The United States purchased Alaska from Russia in 1867. Early American explorers and traders, such as Henry Tureman Allen, Arthur Harper and Bates, first entered the Tanana Valley in 1874 and 1885.

In 1902, the discovery of gold in Fairbanks brought intense activity to the region. The next year, Jim Duke built a trading post or roadhouse to supply river travelers and trade with the Nenana community.

In 1905, the Episcopal Church, which had missionaries in Alaska, built the St. Mark's Episcopal mission and Tortella School a short distance upriver. The boarding school taught about 28 children of various ages at a time. Hudson Stuck, the Archdeacon of the Yukon, regularly visited the settlement, part of the 250,000 square-acre territory of the Interior he administered. Native children from other communities, such as Minto, also attended school in Nenana.

A post office opened in 1908. In 1915, construction of the Alaska Railroad brought new settlers, who doubled Nenana's population. The railroad connected Nenana to the southern port city of Anchorage. The community incorporated as a city in 1921.

The Railroad Depot was completed in 1923. That year, United States President Warren Harding arrived to drive the final, golden spike at the north end of the 700-foot-long (210 m) Mears Memorial Bridge built over the Tanana River as part of the state's railroad project.

This railroad truss bridge, the longest in the United States and its territories when completed, gave Nenana a rail transportation link north to Fairbanks and south to Seward, Alaska. The bridge still ranks as the longest span in Alaska and the third-longest truss bridge in the United States.

The construction had encouraged businesses and settlement in town. According to local records, 5,000 residents lived in Nenana by the early 1920s. After the railroad was completed, however, contractors and construction workers left the area. The city suffered an economic slump, and most of the residents migrated to seek work in other places. By 1930, the population had dropped to 291.

Nenana was the starting point for the 1925 serum run to Nome, after diphtheria antitoxin had been transported by rail from Anchorage. It was carried by dog sled to Nome to treat people in an epidemic.

In 1961, Clear Air Force Station was constructed 21 miles southwest. During this construction, many civilian contractors commuted from Nenana. A road was constructed south to Clear, but northbound vehicles had to be ferried across the Tanana River.

In 1967, the community was devastated by one of the largest floods ever recorded in the valley. In 1968, a $6 million bridge for vehicles was completed across the Tanana River, which gave the town a modern road link to Fairbanks and replaced the river ferry. The George Parks Highway was completed in 1971, providing a shorter, direct route to Anchorage.

The federally recognized tribe in the community is the Nenana Native Association, who traditionally spoke the Lower Tanana language. Under the Alaska Native Claims Settlement Act of 1971, they have rights of self-government and manage some of their traditional territory. According to the 2000 Census, 41% of the city's residents were Native American (or Alaska Natives).

Residents of Nenana sponsor the Nenana Ice Classic, a nature-based lottery. Entrants buy a ticket and pick a date in April or May and a time, to the closest minute, when they think the winter ice on the Tanana River will break up. This lottery began in 1917 among a group of surveyors working for the Alaska Railroad. They formed a betting pool as they waited for the river to open and boats to arrive with needed supplies.

The competition is run as follows: a large striped tripod is placed on the frozen Tanana River and connected to a clock. The winner is whoever comes closest to guessing the precise time when the ice beneath weakens to the point that the tripod moves and stops the clock. Interest in the pool has increased and attracts bettors statewide. This lottery has paid out nearly $10 million in prize money, with the winning pool in recent years being near $300,000.

In the summer of 2008, Nenana suffered heavy damage due to flooding. The Tanana River reached its second-highest level since written record keeping began.

== Geography and climate ==
Nenana is located at 64°33′50″N 149°5′35″W, (Sec. 14, T004S, R008W, Fairbanks Meridian) in the Nenana Recording District.

According to the United States Census Bureau, the city has a total area of 6.1 square miles (16 km^{2}), of which, 6.0 square miles (16 km^{2}) of it is land and 0.1 square miles (0.26 km^{2}) of it (0.99%) is water.

Nenana is located 55 road miles southwest of Fairbanks on the George Parks Highway and 304 road miles north of Anchorage. It is at mile 412 of the Alaska Railroad. The river is ice-free from early May to late October.

Nenana has a transitional humid continental/subarctic climate (Köppen Dfb/Dfc) with long, cold and dry winters and warm summers with cool nights.

Climate data for Nenana Municipal Airport, Alaska, 1991–2020 normals, extremes 1948–present
Month	Jan	Feb	Mar	Apr	May	Jun	Jul	Aug	Sep	Oct	Nov	Dec	Year
Record high °F (°C)	53 (12)	52 (11)	55 (13)	74 (23)	87 (31)	93 (34)	92 (33)	91 (33)	77 (25)	75 (24)	54 (12)	52 (11)	93 (34)
Mean daily maximum °F (°C)	5.3 (−14.8)	14.8 (−9.6)	24.4 (−4.2)	45.2 (7.3)	62.5 (16.9)	72.4 (22.4)	73.2 (22.9)	66.8 (19.3)	55.4 (13.0)	34.5 (1.4)	15.2 (−9.3)	8.2 (−13.2)	39.8 (4.3)
Daily mean °F (°C)	−3.2 (−19.6)	4.7 (−15.2)	12.5 (−10.8)	33.9 (1.1)	50.5 (10.3)	60.8 (16.0)	63.0 (17.2)	57.4 (14.1)	46.4 (8.0)	27.7 (−2.4)	7.9 (−13.4)	−0.3 (−17.9)	30.1 (−1.0)
Mean daily minimum °F (°C)	−11.6 (−24.2)	−5.5 (−20.8)	−0.6 (−18.1)	22.7 (−5.2)	38.5 (3.6)	49.2 (9.6)	52.8 (11.6)	48.0 (8.9)	37.4 (3.0)	20.8 (−6.2)	−0.5 (−18.1)	−8.7 (−22.6)	20.2 (−6.5)
Record low °F (°C)	−66 (−54)	−65 (−54)	−59 (−51)	−33 (−36)	2 (−17)	24 (−4)	31 (−1)	24 (−4)	1 (−17)	−28 (−33)	−48 (−44)	−69 (−56)	−69 (−56)
Average precipitation inches (mm)	0.58 (15)	0.44 (11)	0.36 (9.1)	0.29 (7.4)	0.62 (16)	1.76 (45)	2.32 (59)	2.34 (59)	1.43 (36)	0.87 (22)	0.79 (20)	0.57 (14)	12.37 (313.5)
Average precipitation days	7.4	5.9	4.5	3.5	5.9	10.1	12.0	13.0	9.9	7.7	7.5	6.9	94.3
Source 1: NOAA
Source 2: xmACIS2

== Demographics ==
Historical population
Census	Pop.	Note	%±
1910	190		—
1920	634		233.7%
1930	291		−54.1%
1940	231		−20.6%
1950	242		4.8%
1960	286		18.2%
1970	382		33.6%
1980	470		23.0%
1990	393		−16.4%
2000	402		2.3%
2010	378		−6.0%
2020	358		−5.3%
U.S. Decennial Census

Nenana first reported on the 1910 U.S. Census as an unincorporated village. It formally incorporated in 1921.

The Nenana native village reported separately on the 1920, 1940 and 1960 U.S. Censuses with 172, 86 & 33 residents respectively.

=== 2020 census ===
As of the 2020 census, Nenana had a population of 358. The median age was 44.0 years. 24.6% of residents were under the age of 18 and 20.7% of residents were 65 years of age or older. For every 100 females there were 95.6 males, and for every 100 females age 18 and over there were 90.1 males age 18 and over.

0.0% of residents lived in urban areas, while 100.0% lived in rural areas.

There were 169 households in Nenana, of which 29.0% had children under the age of 18 living in them. Of all households, 36.1% were married-couple households, 20.1% were households with a male householder and no spouse or partner present, and 30.2% were households with a female householder and no spouse or partner present. About 37.3% of all households were made up of individuals and 15.4% had someone living alone who was 65 years of age or older.

There were 219 housing units, of which 22.8% were vacant. The homeowner vacancy rate was 5.5% and the rental vacancy rate was 27.3%.

Racial composition as of the 2020 census
Race	Number	Percent
White	207	57.8%
Black or African American	0	0.0%
American Indian and Alaska Native	147	41.1%
Asian	0	0.0%
Native Hawaiian and Other Pacific Islander	0	0.0%
Some other race	0	0.0%
Two or more races	4	1.1%
Hispanic or Latino (of any race)	0	0.0%

=== 2000 census ===
As of the 2000 census, there were 402 people, 171 households, and 87 families residing in the city. The population density was 66.6 inhabitants per square mile (25.7/km^{2}). There were 210 housing units at an average density of 34.8 per square mile (13.4/km^{2}). The racial makeup of the city was 50.75% White, 0.25% Black or African American, 41.04% Native American, 0.50% Asian, and 7.46% from two or more races. Hispanic or Latino of any race were 2.49% of the population.

There were 171 households, out of which 24.0% had children under the age of 18 living with them, 31.0% were married couples living together, 12.3% had a female householder with no husband present, and 49.1% were non-families. 42.1% of all households were made up of individuals, and 17.5% had someone living alone who was 65 years of age or older. The average household size was 2.35 and the average family size was 3.30.

In the city, the population was spread out, with 27.6% under the age of 18, 7.7% from 18 to 24, 22.6% from 25 to 44, 28.9% from 45 to 64, and 13.2% who were 65 years of age or older. The median age was 40 years. For every 100 females, there were 112.7 males. For every 100 females age 18 and over, there were 118.8 males.

The median income for a household in the city was $33,333, and the median income for a family was $40,938. Males had a median income of $46,125 versus $26,094 for females. The per capita income for the city was $17,334. About 13.4% of families and 17.8% of the population were below the poverty line, including 13.9% of those under age 18 and 19.4% of those age 65 or over.

== Public services ==
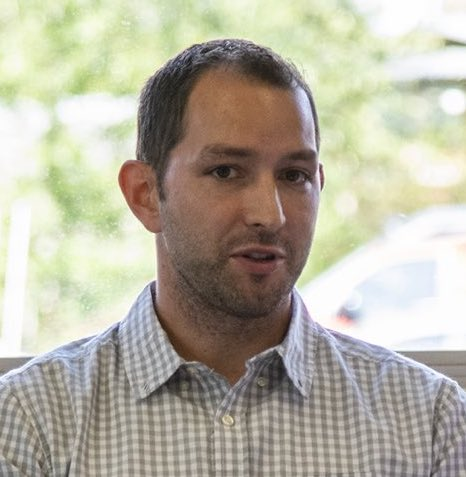
Josh Verhagen, Mayor of Nenana

Water is drawn from wells, then treated and distributed via circulating loops. A piped gravity system collects sewage, which is treated at a secondary treatment plant. Most of the City is connected to the piped water and sewer system: 215 homes and the school are served. The remaining homes have individual wells and septic systems.

Refuse is collected by a private firm and hauled to the new Denali Borough regional landfill, located south of Anderson. Electricity is provided by Golden Valley Electric Association. A school provides education for grades kindergarten through 12 (200 students). The Nenana Student Living Center, one of three statewide boarding schools for high school students, attracts students from around the state to attend the local school. The school has an extensive arts program (music, artistic and performing programs), strong academic quality, and vocational studies.

The City has a library with a full-time librarian, internet access and full library services, including inter-library loans. Health clinic services are provided by the Nenana Native Clinic. A regional hospital is located in Fairbanks, 55 miles away. Specialized services include the Railbelt Mental Health & Addiction Services.

Emergency Services have highway, river and airport access. 911 emergency service is available in Nenana; auxiliary health care is provided by Nenana Volunteer Fire/EMS or Fairbanks hospitals. Police service is provided by the Alaska State Troopers.

== Economy and transport ==
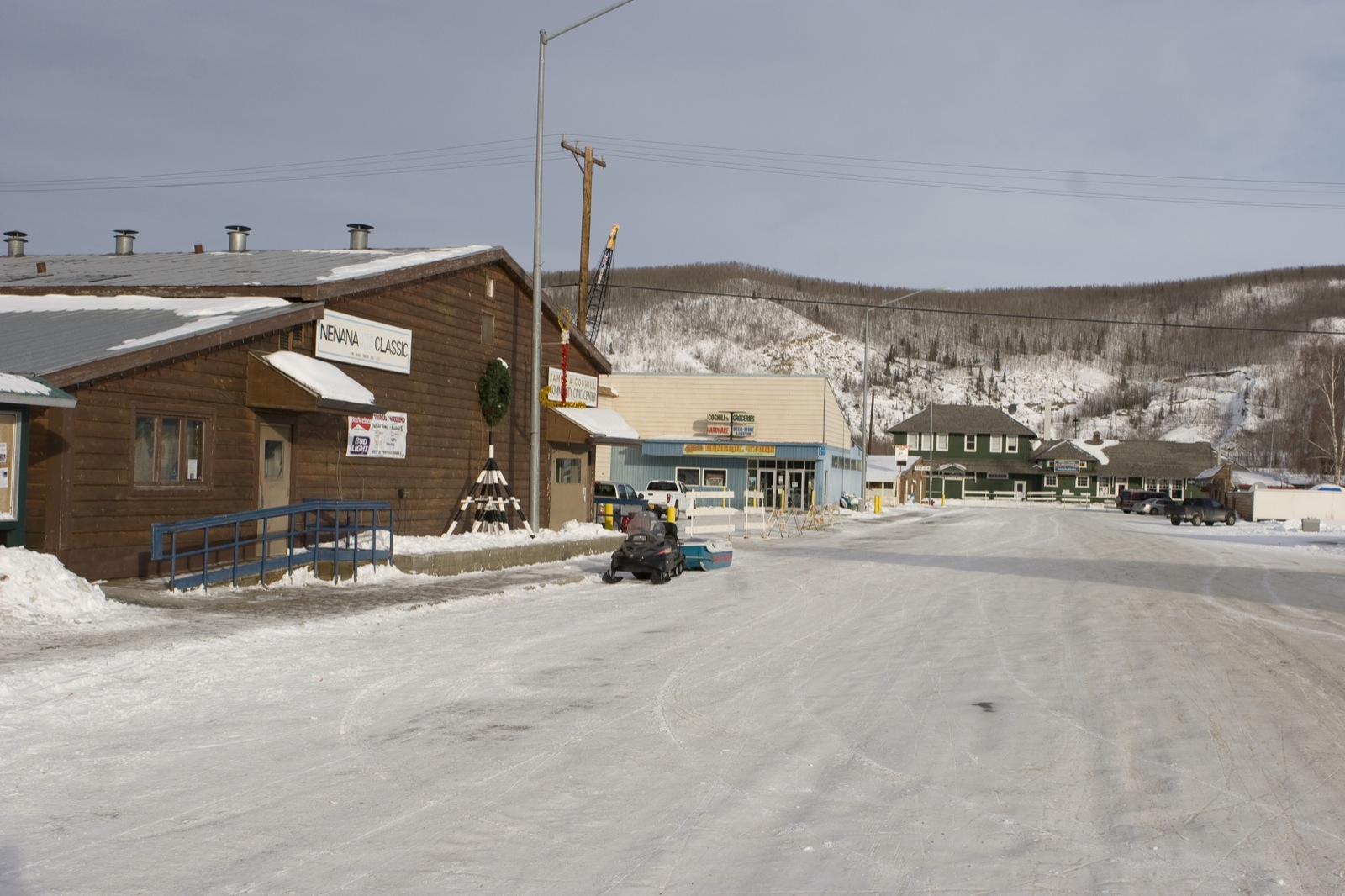
A Street is the main street of the Nenana townsite. The larger buildings seen in this view, from left to right: the Nenana Civic Center (which doubles as headquarters for the Nenana Ice Classic), Coghill's Store and the Nenana Depot of the Alaska Railroad.

Over 40% of the year-round jobs are with the government, including the City, Tribe, Nenana School District, Yukon–Koyukuk School District, and highway maintenance by the Alaska Department of Transportation and Public Facilities. Golden Valley Electric Association has a regional office in Nenana. Nenana has a rural lifestyle but has good access to Fairbanks on the major north-south George Parks Highway.

Nenana has affordable housing and low rents. The private sector economy is based on its role as the center of rail-to-river barge transportation for the Interior. Crowley Marine is a major private employer, supplying villages along the Tanana and Yukon rivers each summer with cargo and fuel.

The City also attracts independent travelers with such attractions as the Alaska Railroad Museum, the Golden Railroad Spike Historic Park and Interpretive Center, the historical St. Mark's Episcopal Church (built in 1905), Iditarod dog kennels, and a replica of the sternwheeler Nenana. A heritage center features displays of local culture and history, and is open during the summer tourist season from May to September.

Nenana is a center of dog mushing; a number of world-class teams train in the area. It is also home to a number of artists whose works reflect the local frontier lifestyle. A number of large farms produce quality and specialized crops in some of the best growing conditions in Alaska. The Nenana Ice Classic administration provides employment for nearly 100 locals during the counting and tabulation of entries for the Tanana River ice breakup. Twenty-seven residents hold commercial fishing permits. Numerous Native and non-Native households rely on traditional subsistence foods, such as salmon, moose, caribou, bear, waterfowl and berries.

Taxes: Sales: 4%, Property: 12.0 mills, Special: None

Nenana has air, river, road and railroad access. The George Parks Highway provides road access to Fairbanks and Anchorage. A boat landing at the end of 10th street turning west off the George Parks Highway provides free boat access to the Nenana River. A short distance north of the landing is the confluence of the Nenana and Tanana rivers, so boaters have easy access to the river system of the Tanana River and Minto Flats. The boat landing is used by hundreds of hunters and outdoor enthusiasts each year.

The railroad provides daily freight service. The Nenana Municipal Airport offers two landing areas: a lighted, asphalt runway 5,000 feet long by 100 feet wide, and an airstrip, turf, 2,520 feet long by 80 feet wide. The airport also has landing areas for float planes and ski planes. The Nenana Port Authority operates the dry cargo loading and unloading facilities, dock, bulkhead, and warehouse. The Tanana River is shallow, with a maximum draft for loaded river barges of 4.5 feet; by comparison, the Yukon River has few shallow areas.

== In popular culture ==
Nenana and the Ice Classic were featured in the 1938 movie Call of the Yukon. Richard Arlen and Beverly Roberts played a mismatched pair on a trek to Nenana to escape a village famine.

Nenana was also featured in the 1995 animated movie Balto and the 2019 live-action film Togo. Nenana was where the antitoxin was unloaded from the Alaska Railroad and run to Nome by dogsled.

Nenana was also featured in Season 6 of Life Below Zero 2015 depicting Jesse who lives with his 25 sled dogs and lives off the land.

Season 1 Episode 20 of Molly of Denali, 'Welcome Home Balto' is centered on the antitoxin delivery and is set mainly in Nenana.

It was also featured in the BBC World Series Alaska.

The documentary Classic, by director Tim Kaminski, was released on VOD in April 2021. The film chronicles the 100th anniversary of the Ice Classic which took place in 2016.

Nenana and the Nenana Ice Classic were featured on Last Week Tonight with John Oliver near the end of the show's March 27, 2022, episode.
