= List of memorials to Warren G. Harding =

Among the memorials to and namesakes of Warren G. Harding, the 29th president of the United States, are the following:

== Memorials ==
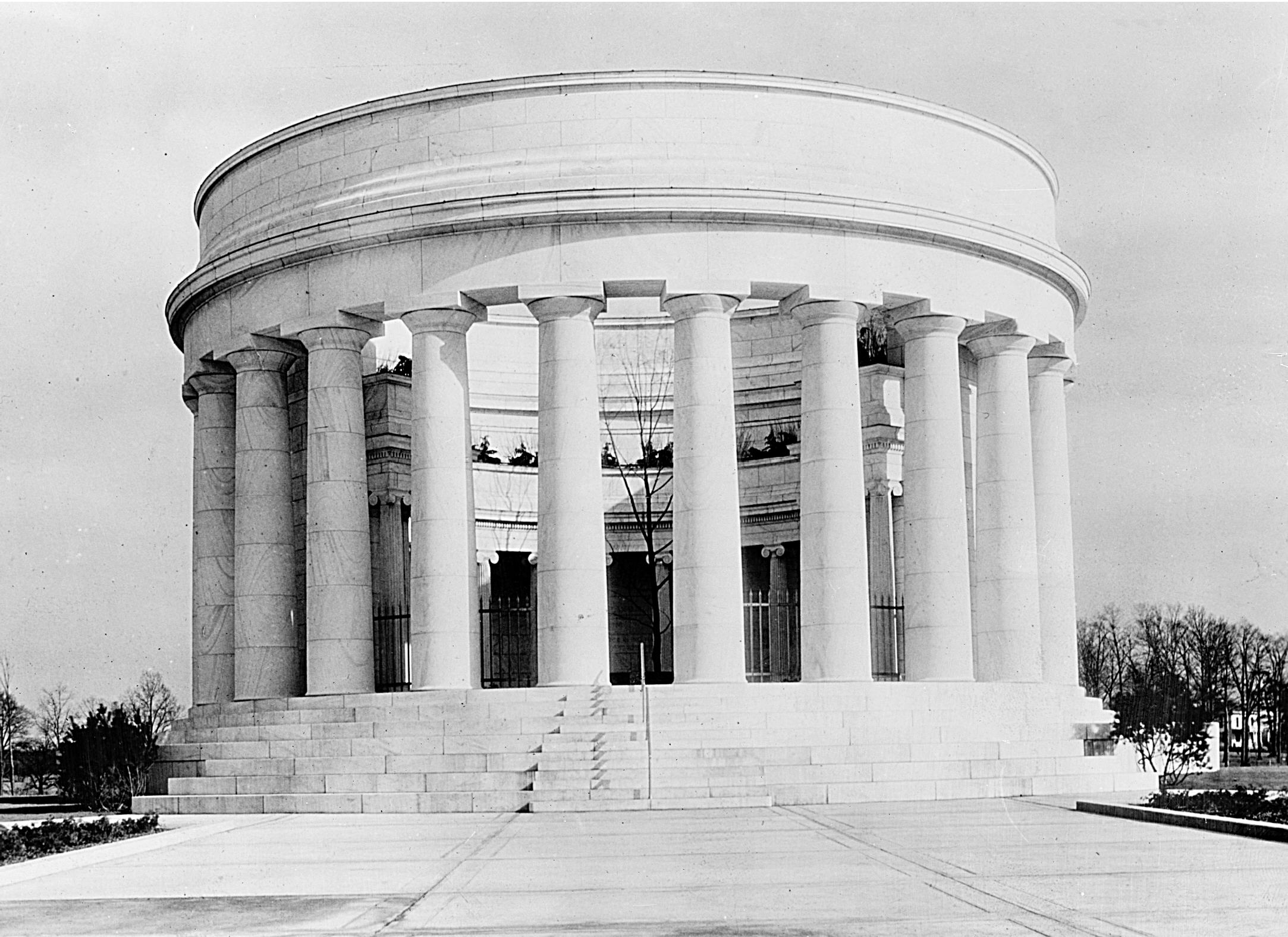
Harding Memorial shortly after completion

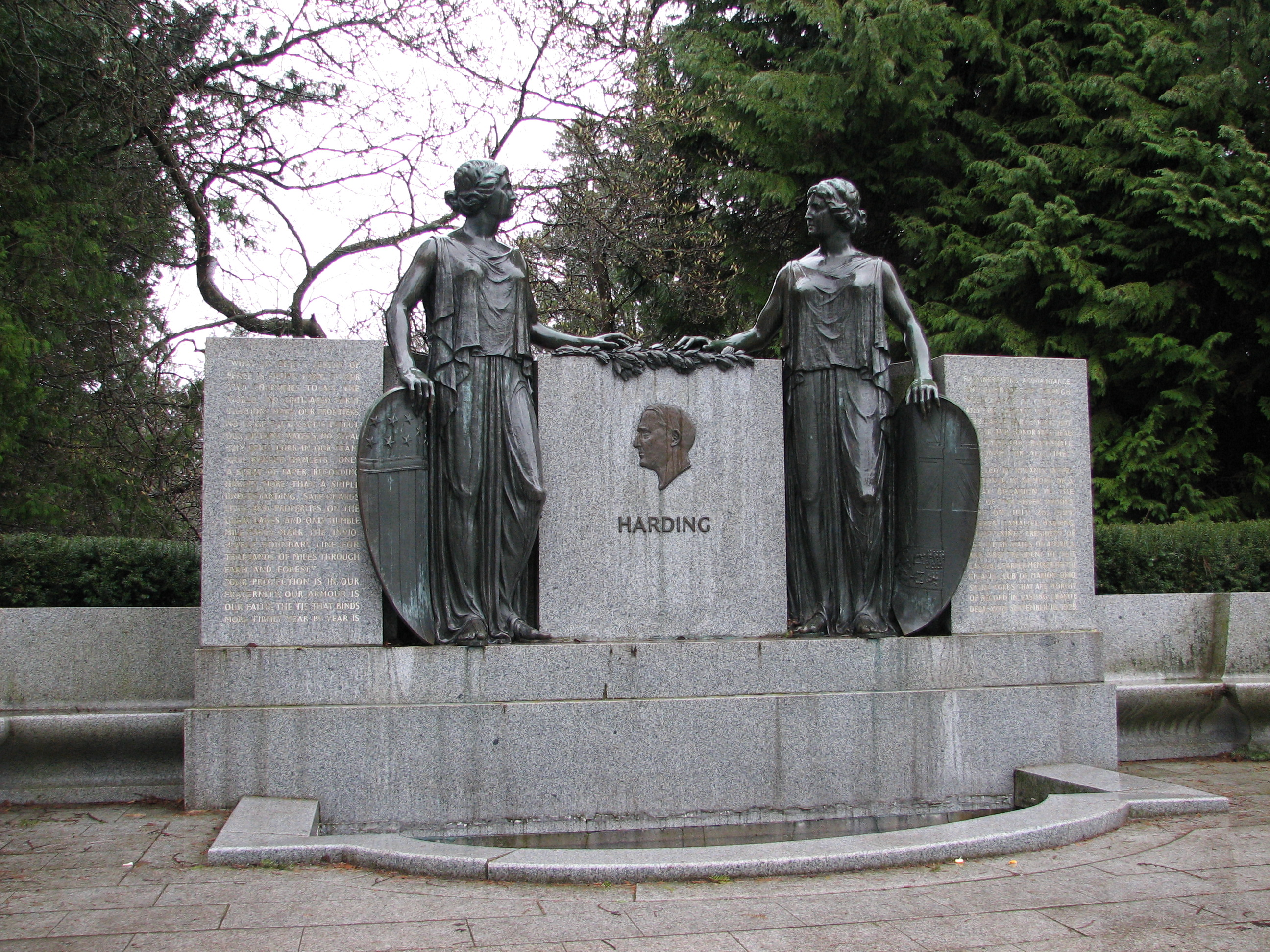
A statue honoring Harding on a speech he delivered on relations between the United States and Canada in Stanley Park, Vancouver, British Columbia, Canada

- Harding Memorial, Marion, Ohio, listed on the National Register of Historic Places, is the president's burial site
- Peace Treaty Marker in Somerville, New Jersey. In 1921, at the estate of New Jersey Governor Joseph S. Frelinghuysen, Warren Harding signed the peace treaty that ended America's involvement in World War I. Today, the estate has been replaced with mini-malls. The marker remains in a patch of grass near a Burger King parking lot along Route 28, just north of the Somerville traffic circle.
- Harding Memorial, Seattle, Washington. In 1925, a memorial was erected in Seattle at Woodland Park to commemorate the site of Harding's next-to-last public address on July 27, 1923. In 1977, the memorial was demolished and buried under the Woodland Park Zoo's African Savanna exhibit. The memorial's only surviving elements—two life-sized bronze statues of Boy Scouts that once saluted the image of Harding—were donated to the Chief Seattle Council of the Boy Scouts of America. One stands at the Boy Scouts headquarters in Seattle; the other at Camp Parsons, a Boy Scouts camp in Brinnon, Jefferson County, Washington.
- The President, a giant sequoia in Sequoia National Park dedicated to Harding in 1923.

== Schools ==
- Warren G. Harding High School, Warren, Ohio
- Warren G. Harding Middle School, Steubenville, Ohio
- Warren G. Harding High School; Bridgeport, Connecticut
- Warren G. Harding Middle School, Philadelphia, Pennsylvania
- Harding Senior High School, Saint Paul, Minnesota
- Harding Middle School, Cedar Rapids, Iowa
- Harding Elementary School, Santa Barbara, California
- Harding Elementary School, El Cerrito, California
- Warren G. Harding Elementary School, Hammond, Indiana
- Marion Harding High School, Marion, Ohio
- Ohio Northern University's College of Law was once named after him but was later renamed.
- Harding Charter Preparatory High School, Oklahoma City, Oklahoma
- Harding Fine Arts Academy, Oklahoma City, Oklahoma
- Harding Elementary in Kenilworth, New Jersey
- Harding Middle School in Des Moines, Iowa

== Places ==
- Harding County, New Mexico
- Harding Park Golf Club in San Francisco
- Warren G. Harding Masonic Lodge in Poulsbo, Washington.
- Montana Highway 2 over Pipestone Pass near Butte, Montana is named "The Harding Way" in his honor.
- Harding Icefield in Southcentral Alaska
- Mount Harding near Skagway, Alaska
- Harding Mountain in Washington state
- Harding Township, New Jersey, Named in 1922 for the incumbent president.
- In a neighborhood of Ketchikan, Alaska, north of the original townsite (or present-day downtown), three adjoining streets were named Warren, G and Harding following Harding's visit to the city.

== Other ==
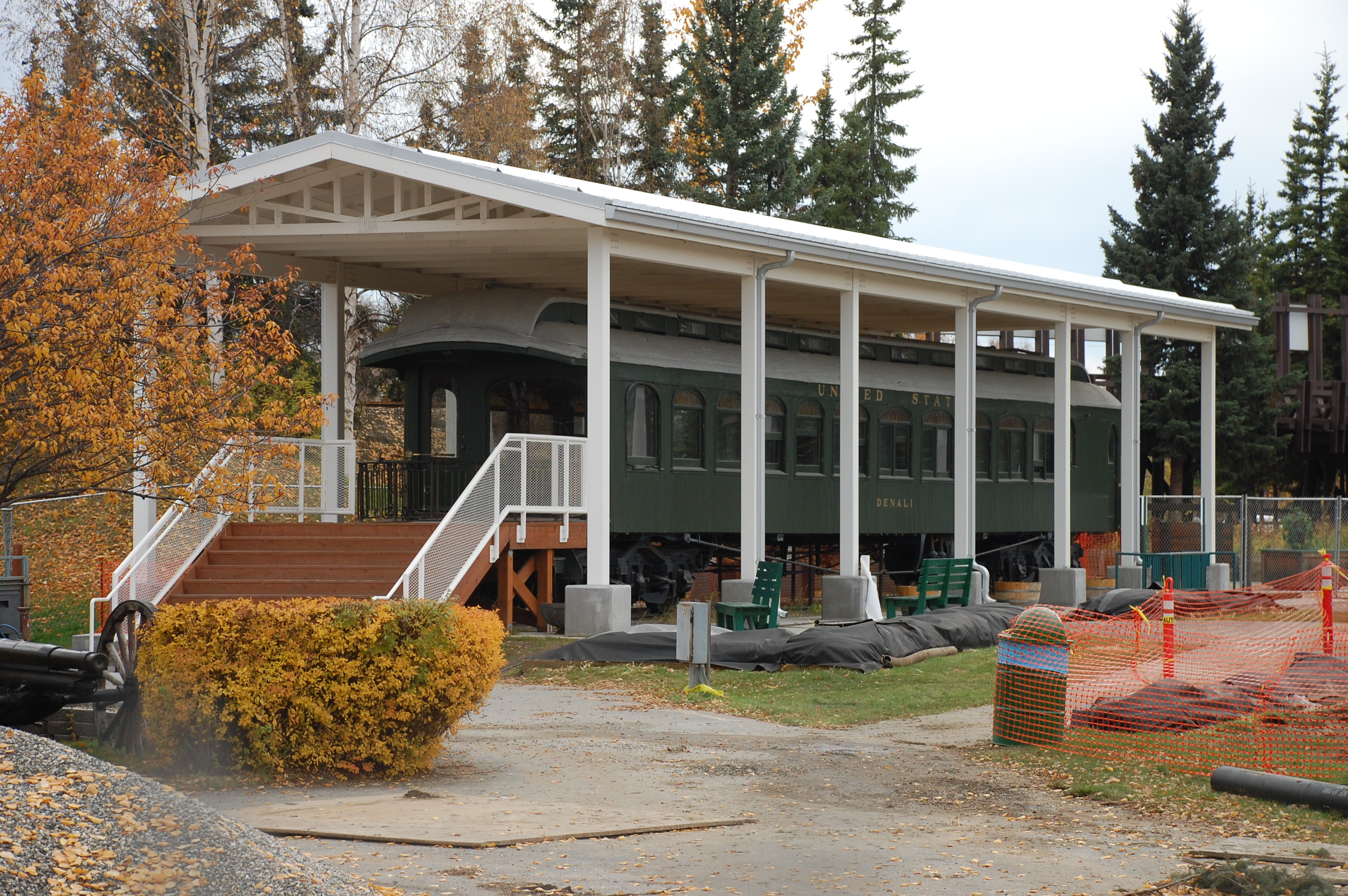
The "Harding Railroad Car" on display in Fairbanks, Alaska.

- The railroad car in which Harding toured Alaska's "Westward" is on display at Pioneer Park in Fairbanks, Alaska, directly inside the main entrance to the park. The car is also listed on the National Register of Historic Places.
- The railroad car that returned Harding's body to Washington, The Superb, is on display at the Southeastern Railway Museum and, as of 2013, is undergoing restoration for public viewing. The car is also listed on the National Register of Historic Places.

== See also ==
- Presidential memorials in the United States
