= Museum of Alaska Transportation & Industry =

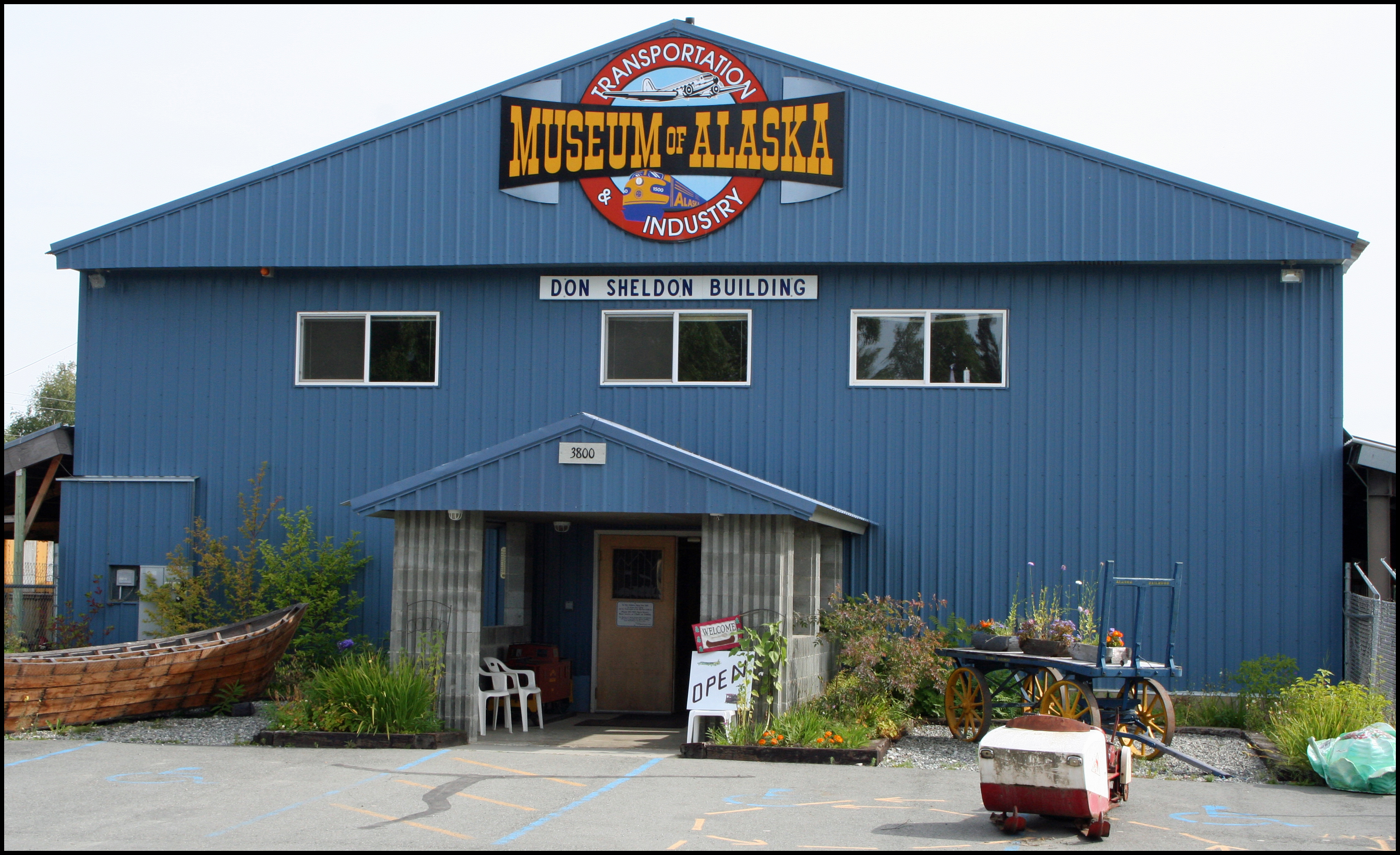
- The front of the Don Sheldon Building

- Location within Alaska
- Former name: Centennial Aviation Progress Museum; Alaska Historical and Transportation Museum
- Established: 1967
- Location: Wasilla, Alaska
- Coordinates: 61.5774°N 149.5450°W
- Type: Transportation museum
- Director: James Grogan
- Curator: James Grogan
- Website: www.museumofalaska.org

The Museum of Alaska Transportation & Industry is a transportation museum located near Wasilla Airport in Wasilla, Alaska.

== History ==
=== Background ===
As part of the 1967 Alaska Centennial celebrations, an effort was begun to collect the history of Alaskan aviation. (Note: Ironically, a different aviation museum, the Pioneer Air Museum, ended up being located at Pioneer Park, which was the site of the centennial.) In June of that year, the Centennial Aviation Progress Museum Committee first met under the chairmanship of Jack Peck. However, within a year the project was taken over by the state, which expanded the scope to all transportation in Alaska. It was developed into the Centennial Train – six former World War II troop cars with exhibits that toured the state. Afterwards, it was placed on display next to the museum.

=== Fire and move to Palmer ===
On 5 September 1973, the museum was destroyed by a fire. 85 to 90 percent of the collection, including at least seven airplanes and many other vehicles, were lost. (Note: A display of moon rocks lost from the museum after the fire was recovered by the Alaska State Museum in 2012.) The museum was already suffering from financial problems before the fire and requested funding from the state to help it recover. Plans were accelerated when nearby road construction forced the train to move.

It moved to an 8,000 sq ft (740 m^{2}) building at the Alaska Stair Fairgrounds in Palmer in 1976 where it became the Alaska Historical and Transportation Museum. The funding from the state; $80,000; came through the following year.

=== Move to Wasilla ===
However, in 1985, the Alaska State Fair announced it would not renew the museum's lease when it ended in 1987. As a result, the museum changed its name to the Museum of Alaska Transportation & Industry and began searching for a new location. In October 1990, it began moving to 10 acres (0.040 km^{2}) it purchased on Jacobsen Lake near Wasilla. (Note: In the meantime, the museum had received parts of three Curtiss P-40 Warhakws that had been illegally removed from Unalaska and Umnak Islands in 1986.)

== Exhibits ==
Exhibits at the museum include radio communication vacuum tubes, automobile fuel and the Whitney Section House. There are also collections of vehicles including snowmobiles, and agricultural machinery.

== Collection ==
=== Aircraft ===
- Bell UH-1H Iroquois
- Cessna UC-78
- Convair F-102A Delta Dagger
- Douglas C-47A Skytrain
- Douglas DC-3A
- Fairchild C-123J Provider
- Kaman UH-2B Seasprite
- Piasecki CH-21B Workhorse
- Rand Robinson KR-1
- Sikorsky H-5H

=== Rail vehicles ===
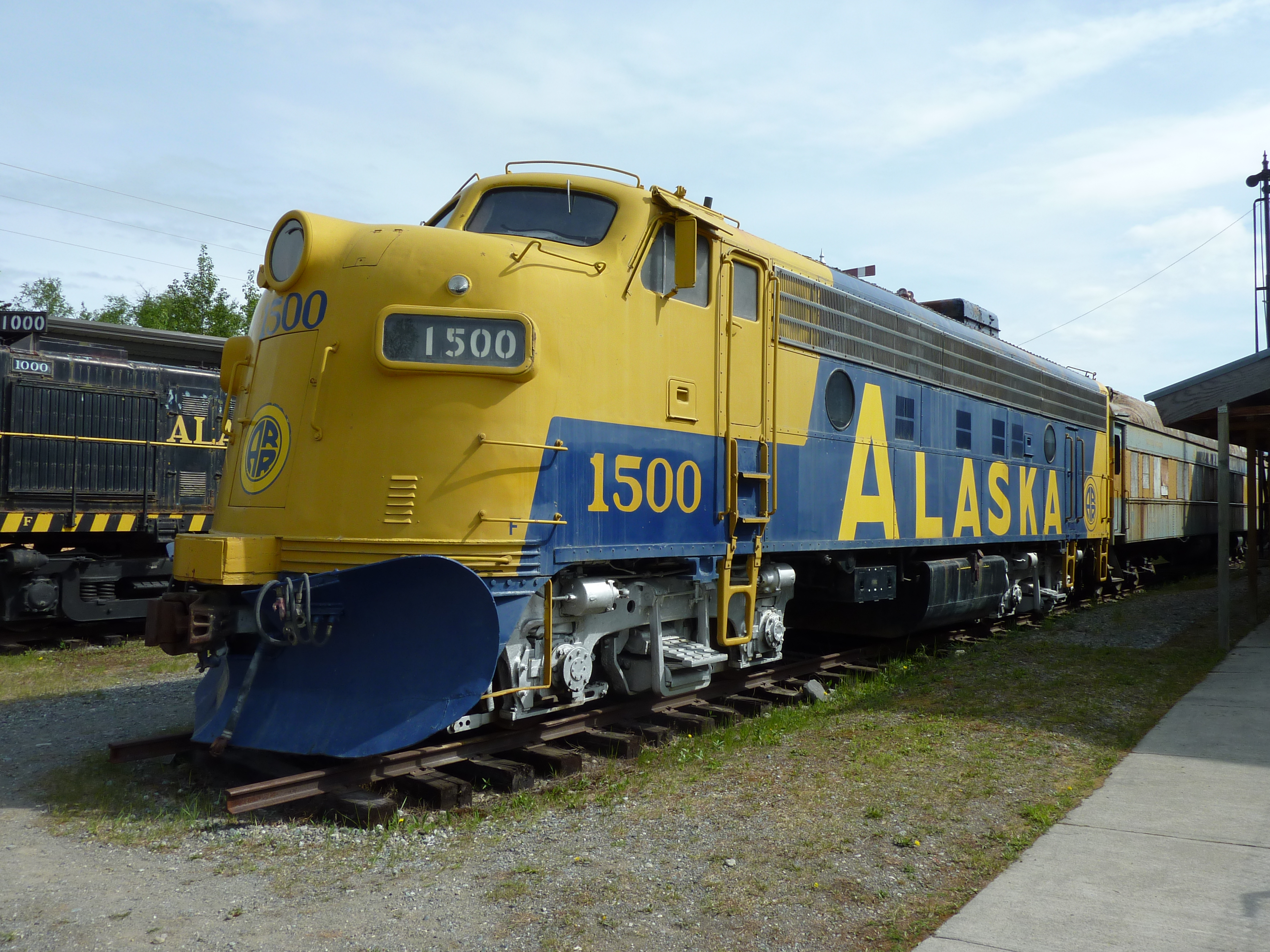
EMD F7A

- EMD F7A
- EMD MRS-1

== See also ==
- Alaska Aviation Museum
- Pioneer Air Museum
