= Voyage of Understanding =

1923 tour of the US President to Alaska

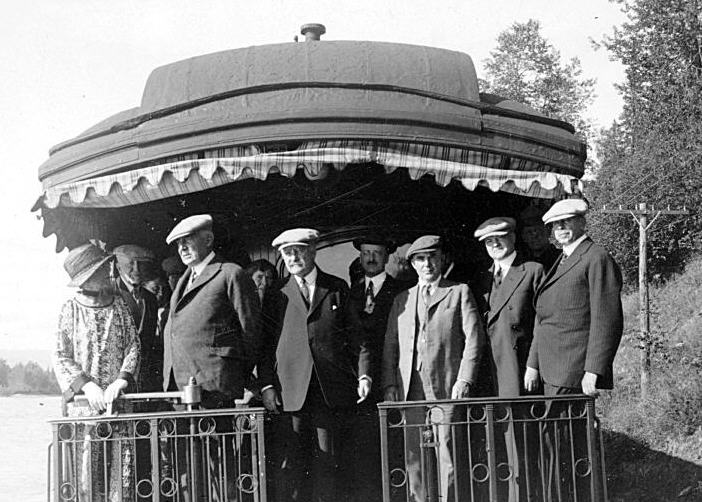
- Top: Harding on the presidential train in Alaska. Bottom: Official engraved portrait.
- Date: June 20 – August 2, 1923; 103 years ago
- Duration: 1 month and 13 days
- Location: United States and Canada
- Type: Whistle stop train tour

The Voyage of Understanding (officially the Tour of the President to Alaska) was a trans-continental tour of the Western United States taken by President Warren G. Harding in the summer of 1923. It marked the first time a sitting president visited Alaska and Canada. The tour took place during the final weeks of Harding's life, as he fell ill during the tour and died.

Harding wished to spend time outside of Washington, D.C. following a number of scandals that had begun to cast a shadow over his presidency, most notably the Teapot Dome scandal. He chose to embark on a tour to improve public relations in anticipation of his reelection campaign in 1924. President Harding, along with Florence Harding and a large company of officials, began the tour across the United States aboard the Superb.

On July 5, Harding and his companions arrived in Tacoma, Washington, and boarded the USS Henderson on a voyage to Alaska. During his time in Alaska, he visited Mount McKinley National Park and what is now the University of Alaska Fairbanks. He also attended the completion of the Alaska Railroad in Nenana, where he drove in the final spike.

As he concluded the Alaska portion of his tour in late July, Harding began to complain of cramps, indigestion, fever and shortness of breath. As written by Herbert Hoover in his memoirs:

We got the President to the Palace Hotel where he insisted that Work and I take rooms close by. The doctors, despite Sawyer, at once diagnosed the case as a heart attack. In their view, it was most serious; and I therefore called Secretary Hughes and told him it might be desirable for him to keep in touch with Vice President Coolidge.

Under treatment the President seemed to improve. The doctors insisted that he must have two months of absolute rest. Through friends I arranged to take a private residence for him on the California coast. In the meantime, the date for the San Francisco speech (July 31) had arrived, and the President authorized me to release it to the press, although it was not delivered. I did so, as I wanted to establish that much of a broader foreign policy. Senator Hiram Johnson and the isolationist press were greatly irritated and attacked me for some days as being the author.

By the next afternoon it appeared that the President’s condition had so much improved that I called Secretary Hughes and told him the worst seemed to be over.

"Exterior view of the Palace Hotel in San Francisco on which centered the eyes of the nation as President Harding, occupying suite on top floor, is making fight for his life there" (1923)

That evening, however, while Mrs. Harding was reading him a magazine article, the nurse saw he had broken out with perspiration. Throwing back the blankets, she began to bathe his chest, when she perceived that he was dying. Dr. Sawyer was in the room, but Mrs. Harding ran out and summoned Dr. Boone, who sent for Dr. Wilbur also. The doctors could do nothing—in a few minutes he was dead. The cause was undoubtedly a heart attack. Dr. Wilbur en route to the sick room had said to me that something had gone wrong, and I accompanied him within a few moments after the President was dead. People do not die from a broken heart, but people with bad hearts may reach the end much sooner from great worries.

He died in San Francisco on August 2. The original cause of death was stated to be a stroke, but it is now believed that he died of a heart attack.

The Harding Railroad Car was listed on the National Register of Historic Places in 1978, and the Superb was listed in 1998.

Left to right: President Warren G. Harding, Speaker of the House Frederick H. Gillett, and local businessman Lee Charles Miller (1865-1930) at the Salt Lake Country Club. Photograph taken June 26, 1923, during the first week of the Voyage of Understanding, the final tour of Harding's presidency.

== Itinerary ==
Itinerary
| Date | City | Notes |
|---|---|---|
| June 20 | Washington, D.C. Grafton, West Virginia | |
| June 21 | Mitchell, Indiana; Washington, Indiana; Vincennes, Indiana; Olney, Illinois; Flora, Illinois; Salem, Illinois; Carlyle, Illinois; St. Louis, Missouri | Whistle-stop train tour |
| June 22 | Kansas City, Missouri | |
| June 23 | Hutchinson, Kansas; Dodge City, Kansas | |
| June 24 | Colorado Springs, Colorado; Denver, Colorado | |
| June 25 | Greeley, Colorado; Cheyenne, Wyoming; Laramie, Wyoming | |
| June 26 | Ogden, Utah; Bountiful, Utah; Salt Lake City, Utah | |
| June 27 | Toquerville, Utah; Cedar City, Utah | Visited Zion National Park, opened a new railroad branch line |
| June 28 | Brigham, Utah; Pocatello, Idaho; Blackfoot, Idaho; Idaho Falls, Idaho; Dubois, Idaho | |
| June 29 | Dillon, Montana; Butte, Montana; Boulder, Montana; Helena, Montana | |
| June 30 | Gardiner, Montana | Visiting Yellowstone National Park |
| July 1 | Livingston, Montana | |
| July 2 | St. Maries, Idaho; Spokane, Washington; Cheney, Washington | |
| July 3 | Meacham, Oregon; Pendleton, Oregon; The Dalles, Oregon | |
| July 4 | Portland, Oregon; Vancouver, Washington | |
| July 5 | Centralia, Washington; Tacoma, Washington | Boarded the USS Henderson |
| July 8 | Metlakatla, Alaska; Ketchikan, Alaska | Via the USS Henderson |
| July 9 | Wrangell, Alaska | Via the USS Henderson |
| July 10 | Juneau, Alaska | Via the USS Henderson |
| July 11 | Skagway, Alaska | Via the USS Henderson |
| July 13 | Seward, Alaska; Anchorage, Alaska | Via the USS Henderson |
| July 15 | McKinley Park, Alaska; Nenana, Alaska | Became the first and only president to visit Mount McKinley National Park (now Denali National Park and Preserve). Drove the ceremonial last spike completing the Alaska Railroad. |
| July 16 | Fairbanks, Alaska | Via the Alaska Railroad |
| July 18 | Seward, Alaska | Had intended to travel south from Fairbanks by the Richardson Trail, but this was canceled due to the First Lady's illness. Returned south via the Alaska Railroad instead. |
| July 19 | Valdez, Alaska | Via the USS Henderson |
| July 20 | Cordova, Alaska | Via the USS Henderson |
| July 22 | Sitka, Alaska | Via the USS Henderson |
| July 26 | Vancouver, British Columbia | Via the USS Henderson |
| July 27 | Seattle, Washington | Via the USS Henderson |
| July 28 | Portland, Oregon | |
| July 29 | Merced, California | Visiting Yosemite National Park |
| July 30 | El Portal, California | |
| July 31 | San Francisco, California | |
| August 1 | Los Angeles, California | Canceled |
| August 2-3 | Santa Catalina Island | Canceled |
| August 4 | San Diego, California | Canceled |
