= Air Combat Museum =

- Location within Illinois
- Established: 1989
- Location: Springfield, Illinois
- Coordinates: 39.8420°N 89.6655°W
- Type: Aviation museum
- Founders: Donald George; Mike George
- Website: www.aircombatmuseum.com

The Air Combat Museum is an aviation museum located at the Abraham Lincoln Capital Airport in Springfield, Illinois.

== History ==
After learning about World War II aircraft as a child, Mike George, the son of George Alarm Company founder Donald J. George, bought his first warbird, a T-34 in the 1980s. He purchased another airplane, a P-51D, in 1989 and founded the museum together with his father the same year in a 10,000 sq ft (930 m^{2}) hangar.

The museum built a 3,000 sq ft (280 m^{2}) addition around 2013. It expanded again circa 2021, adding another 20,000 sq ft (1,900 m^{2}) and allowing the museum to consolidate the collection from seven hangars to one.

== Collection ==
=== Aircraft ===
- Beechcraft AT-11 Kansan
- Beechcraft T-34A Mentor
- Cessna 150J
- Cessna C-165 Airmaster
- Curtiss P-40 Warhawk
- de Havilland Chipmunk
- Extra 300L
- Fairchild PT-19
- Fleet 9
- Kreutzer Air Coach
- North American P-51D Mustang "Worry Bird"
- Ryan PT-22 Recruit
- Sopwith Camel – replica
- Stearman C3B
- Stinson SM-2AA Junior
- Taylorcraft L-2M Grasshopper
- Vought F4U-5N Corsair

=== Ground vehicles ===
- Alvis Saladin
- M3 half-track
