= Chattahoochee Valley Railway =

Railroad in Georgia and Alabama, U.S.

Overview
- Headquarters: West Point, Georgia
- Reporting mark: CHV
- Locale: Alabama and Georgia
- Dates of operation: 1900–1992
- Successor: None (Abandoned)

Technical
- Track gauge: 4 ft 8 1/2 in (1,435 mm) (standard gauge)
- Length: 9.5 miles (15.3 km)

The Chattahoochee Valley Railway (reporting mark CHV) was a shortline railroad linking a number of textile mills between West Point, Georgia, and McGinty, Alabama, for a total distance of 9.5 miles (15.3 km). As a subsidiary of West Point Pepperell, the entire railroad was abandoned in 1992.

== History ==
Originally the line was constructed by the Chattahoochee Valley Railroad on July 2, 1895 from Langdale to Lanett, and was extended to Riverview by 1897. In 1900, the railroad was reorganized to become the Chattahoochee Valley Railway. Further expansion included new tracks south to Jester in 1899 and north to Standing Rock, Alabama by 1908. By extending tracks further to Bleecker in 1916 the railroad totaled 45 miles (72 km) and connected to the Atlanta, Birmingham and Coast Railroad, the West Point Route, and the Central of Georgia.

In 1932 part of the railroad was abandoned from Standing Rock to West Point and passenger service ended that same year. In the 1960s, a dam was constructed north of West Point, and the CHV built a short spur line to reach the construction site for delivery of materials. When construction of the dam was completed in 1973 the spur was abandoned. Around the same time, the railroad abandoned the line from Riverview to Bleecker.

The railroad shut down completely on September 23, 1992, with tracks removed the following year. By the time of the abandonment the railroad numbered less than 10 miles (16 km).

CHV 2-8-0 steam locomotive No. 21, built in 1924 by the Baldwin Locomotive Works, is now on display at the Southeastern Railway Museum in Duluth, Georgia.
