= Worry Bird =

Preserved P-51 Mustang aircraft

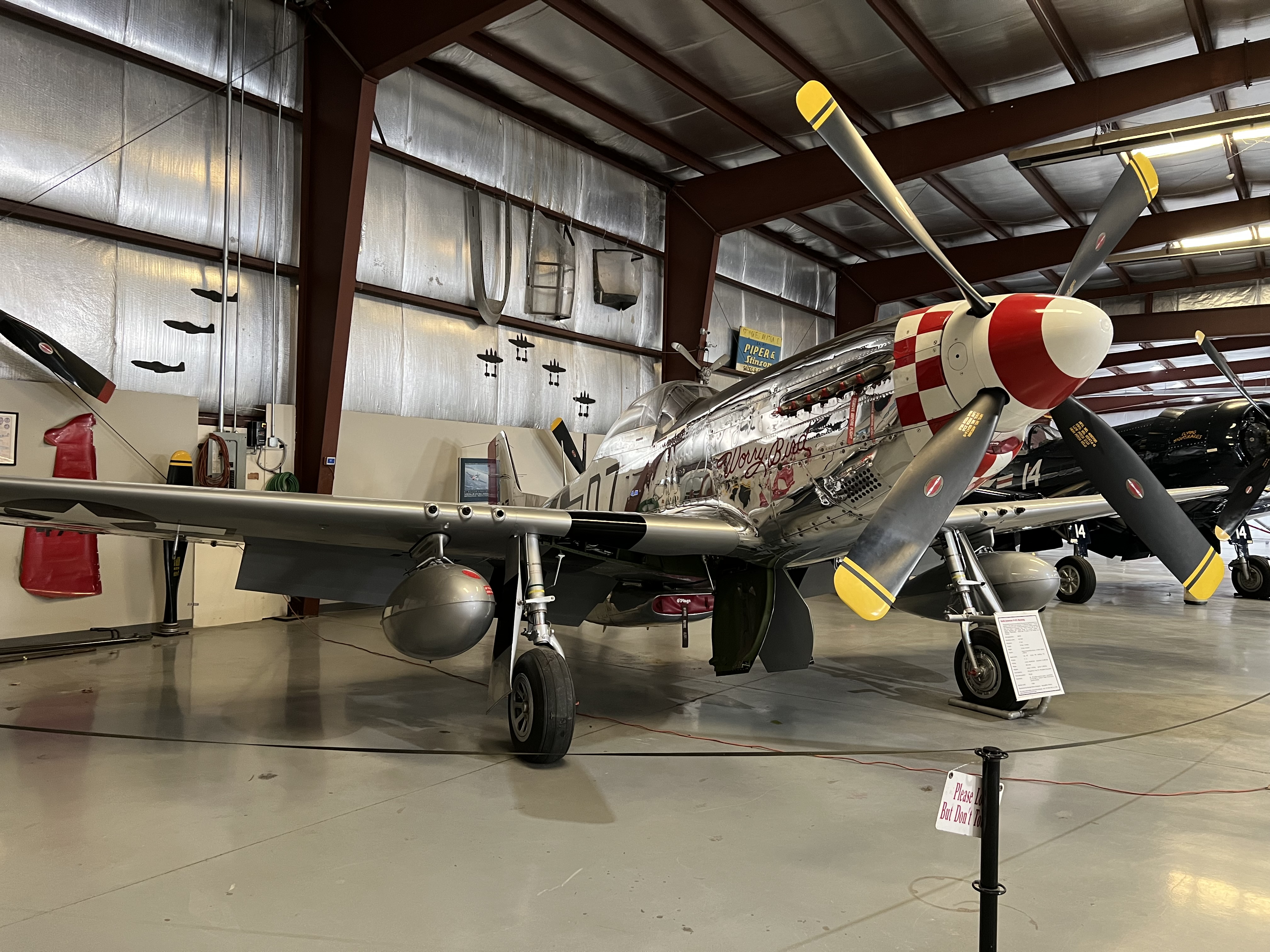
- Worry Bird at the Air Combat Museum

General information
- Type: North American P-51D-25-NA Mustang
- Status: Airworthy
- Serial: 44-73287

History
- First flight: 1944
- Preserved at: Preserved in airworthy condition at the Air Combat Museum at Abraham Lincoln Capital Airport in Springfield, Illinois

- US ARMY Aircraft P-51D-25NA 44-73287
- U.S. National Register of Historic Places
- Location within Illinois Location within the United States
- Location: Capital Airport, 0.5 N of Jct. of IL 29 and Veterans Parkway, Springfield, Illinois
- Coordinates: 39°50′27″N 89°40′33″W
- NRHP reference No.: 99000254
- Added to NRHP: 11 March 1999

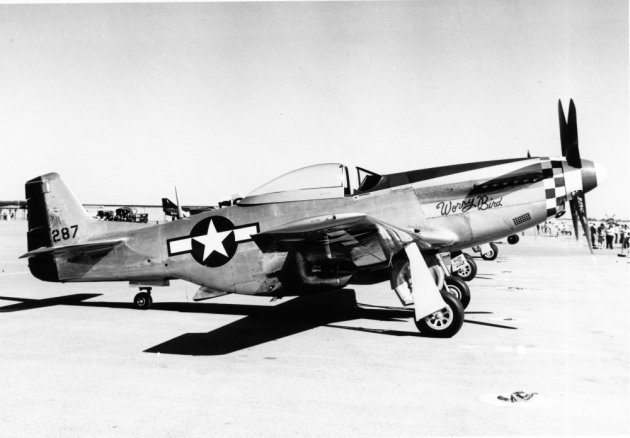
''Worry Bird'' during World War II

Worry Bird is a North American P-51D-25-NA Mustang (ser. no. 44-73287) currently based at the Air Combat Museum at Abraham Lincoln Capital Airport in Springfield, Illinois. The aircraft was built in 1944 and delivered to the United States Army Air Force (USAAF) in the following year to serve in World War II. At the time, the P-51D was a major component of the USAAF fleet and Worry Bird escorted Allied bombers on long-range air raids in Germany.

While the P-51 Mustang was a versatile aircraft used in many roles during the war, its role in European bombing missions was perhaps its most significant, and several historians and Air Force veterans believe the aircraft gave the Allies a decisive advantage in the European aerial theater.

After World War II ended, Worry Bird served in the Korean War and at several Air Force bases before its retirement in 1957. It passed through multiple private owners over the following decades; in the early 1990s, Mike George restored the aircraft and moved it to its current base.

Worry Bird was listed on the National Register of Historic Places on 11 March 1999. Out of over 8,000 P-51 Mustangs which served the U.S. in World War II, Worry Bird was one of 166 surviving and 104 that could still be flown as of its listing.
