= Ryan PT-22 Recruit =

US military trainer aircraft

PT-22 Recruit
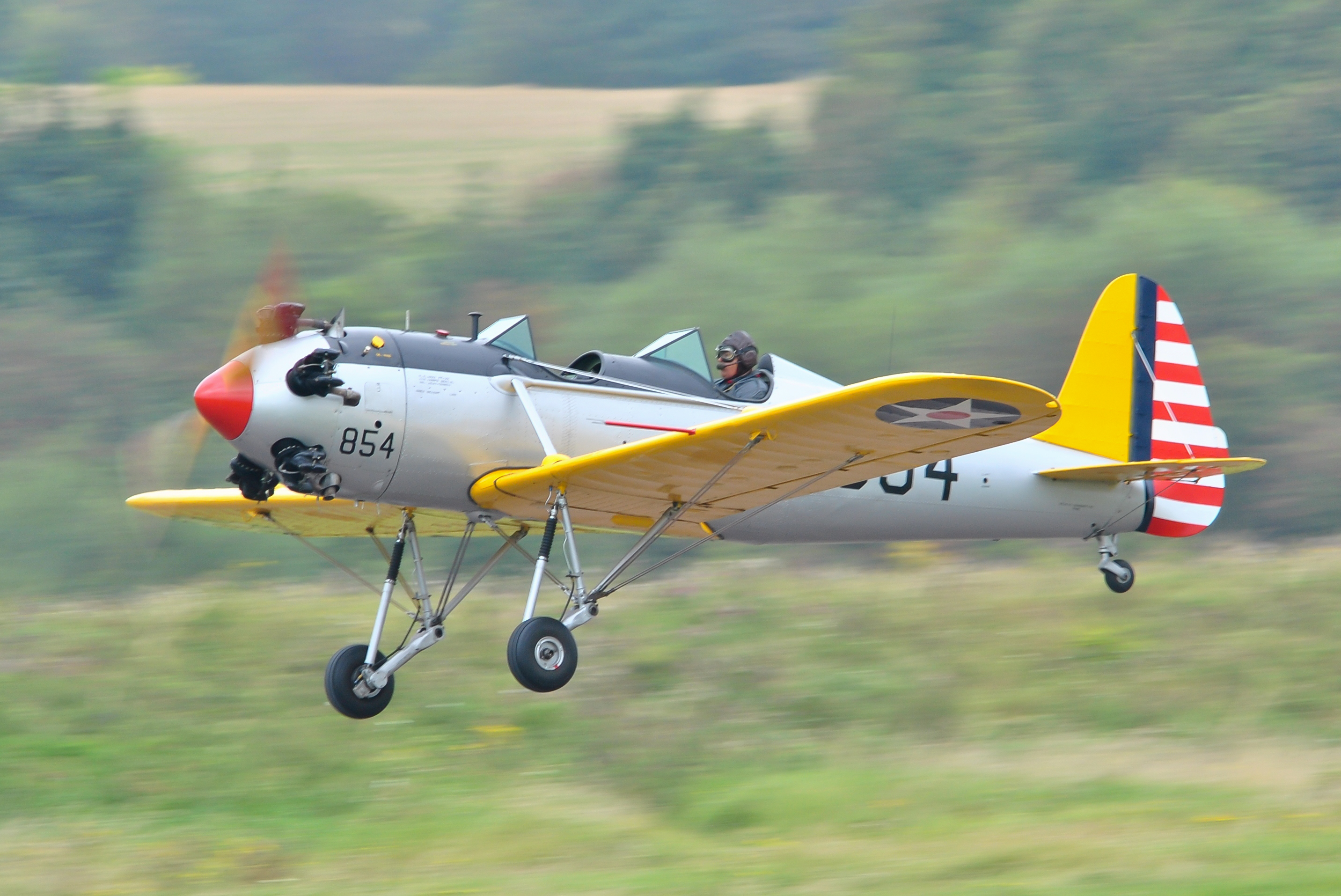
- A refurbished Ryan PT-22 performing at the Shoreham Airshow 2012

General information
- Type: Trainer
- Manufacturer: Ryan Aeronautical Company
- Primary users: United States Army Air Forces United States Army Air Corps
- Number built: 1,048

History
- Developed from: Ryan ST

The Ryan PT-22 Recruit, the main military version of the Ryan ST, is a military trainer aircraft that was used by the United States Army Air Corps during WWII for primary pilot training.

== Design and development ==
The PT-22's fuselage is a simple monocoque structure, with .032 stressed 24ST alclad skin, and nine aluminum alloy bulkheads. The wings feature spruce spars, aluminum alloy ribs, steel compression members, with aircraft fabric covering aft to the trailing edge and aluminum alloy sheet covering from the leading edge to the spar. The wings have 4° 10' of sweep back, 3° of incidence and 4° 30' dihedral.

The PT-22 fuel system consists of a single tank mounted forward of the front cockpit. Fuel is gravity fed to the carburetor. The oil system is a dry-sump type, with all oil stored in a tank located on the front side of the firewall in the upper section of the fuselage. The wing flaps are mechanically operated from a lever located on the left side of each cockpit. Adjustable elevator trim is provided via an elevator trim tab controllable from a handwheel mounted on the left side of each cockpit. In its original configuration, the aircraft was not equipped with an electrical system. Hydraulic brakes are provided for each wheel, controllable via the rudder pedals in each cockpit.

According to Cassagneres, "The main landing gear, in fact, was the most noticeable external change from the STA in that the wheels were mounted outboard of the shock struts rather than the fork type of the earlier STs and STMs. Therefore the distance between the wheel centers was increased by a full 12 inches. The new gear was known as the 'knuckle-type' mounting." The tailwheel was steerable up to 45 degrees when it became full swivel. All main and tail landing gear used oleo struts. Each cockpit included an airspeed indicator, altimeter, oil temperature and pressure gauges, tachometer and compass. Rate of climb indicator, turn and bank indicator, and clock were optional.

In order to simplify maintenance, the wheel spats and landing gear fairings were deleted in the production examples.

== Operational history ==
The PT-22 was developed in 1941 from the civilian Ryan ST series. The earlier PT-20 and PT-21 were the military production versions of the Ryan ST-3 with a total of 100 built. The PT-22 was the United States Army Air Corps' first purpose-built monoplane trainer. The rapid expansion of wartime aircrew training required new trainers, and the Ryan PT-22 was ordered in large numbers. Named the "Recruit", it entered operational service with the U.S. Orders also were placed by the Netherlands, but were never realized as the nation capitulated to Axis forces. The small order of 25 ST-3s was redirected to the United States and redesignated as the PT-22A. Another order also came from the U.S. Navy for 100 examples. The PT series was in heavy use throughout the war years with both military and civil schools, but with the end of the war, was retired from the USAAF.

The Ryan PT-22 remains a popular World War II collector aircraft.

== Variants ==
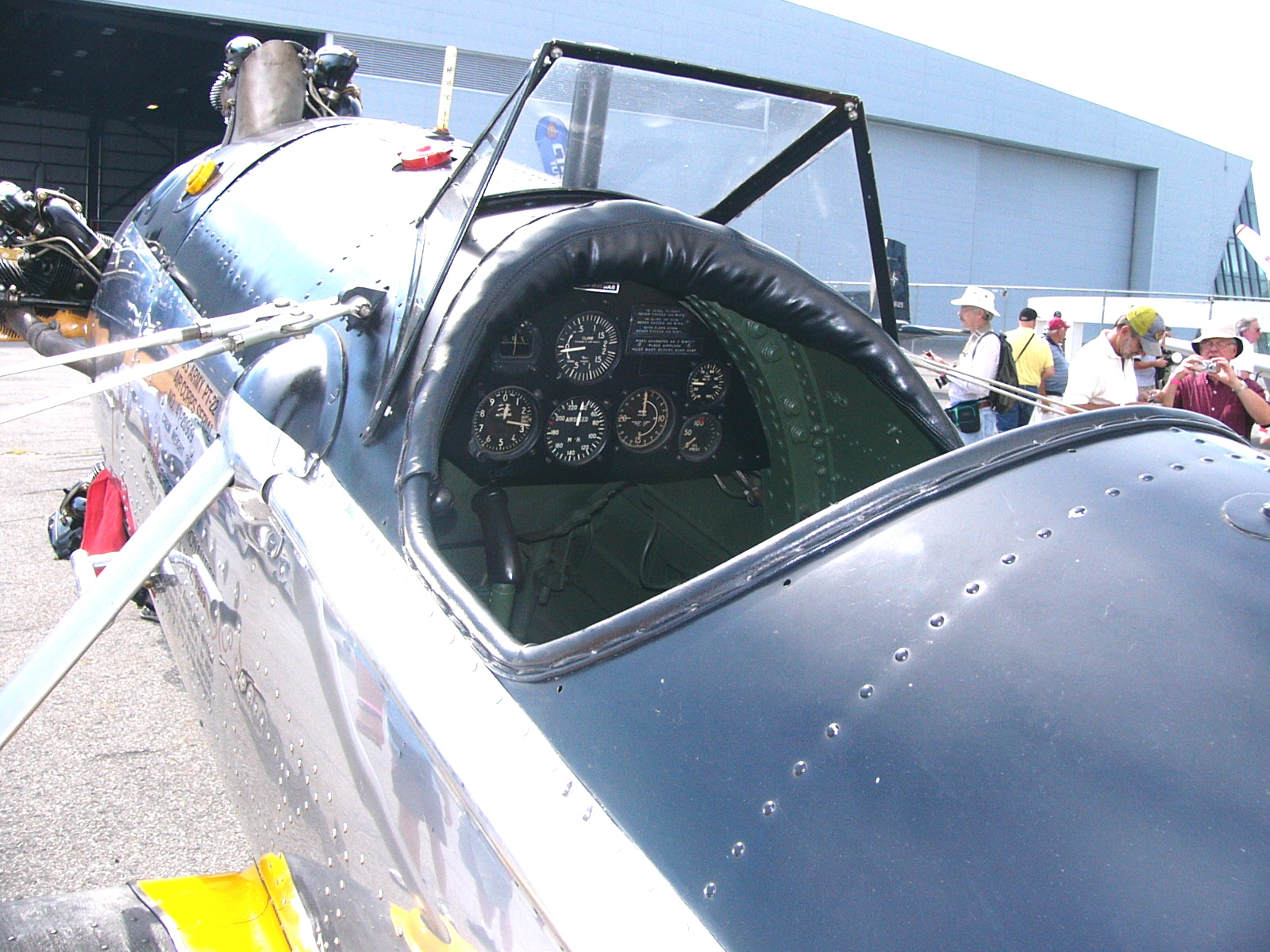
Ryan PT-22 Recruit instrument panel

PT-22
Military version of the Model ST.3KR powered by a 160 hp R-540-1, 1,023 built.
PT-22A
Model ST-3S twin-float seaplanes ordered by the Netherlands Navy powered by 160 hp Menasco D4B, ordered cancelled and completed for the United States Army Air Corps with 160 hp R-540-1 engines, 25 built.
PT-22B
Unbuilt project.
PT-22C
PT-22s re-engined with the 160 hp R-540-3, 250 conversions.

== Operators ==
China

- Republic of China Air Force

Ecuador

- Ecuadorian Air Force

USA

- United States Army Air Corps
- United States Army Air Forces

== Aircraft on display ==
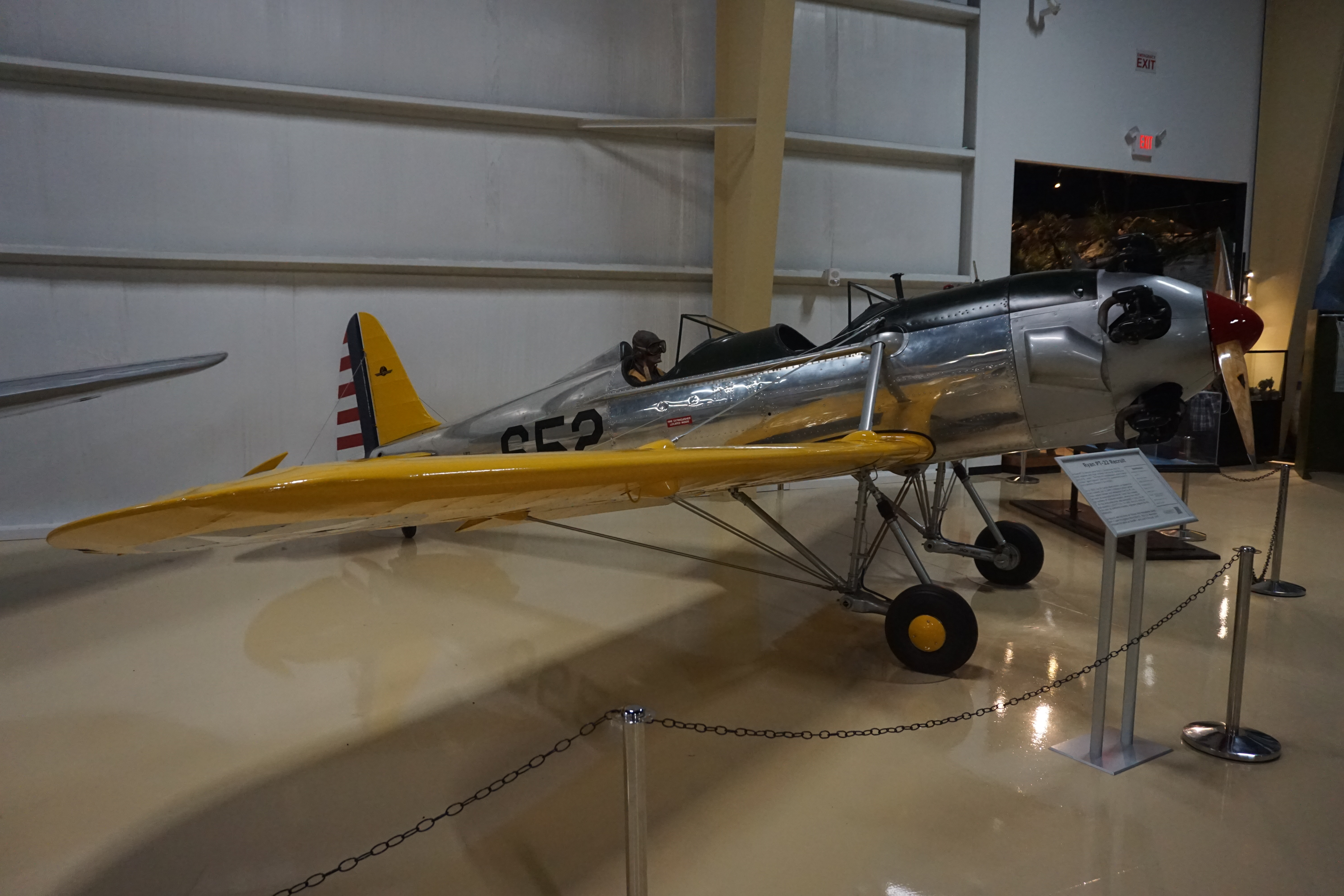
PT-22 on display at the Air Zoo

- PT-22 on static display at the San Diego Air & Space Museum in San Diego, California.
- 41-1936 – PT-22 on display at the Tillamook Air Museum in Tillamook, Oregon.
- 41-15225 – PT-22 on display at the Airpower Museum in Blakesburg, Iowa.
- 41-15329 – PT-22 on display at the Air Combat Museum in Springfield, Illinois.
- 41-15410 – PT-22 on static display at Mid-America Air Museum in Liberal, Kansas.
- 41-15512 – PT-22C on static display at the National Naval Aviation Museum in Pensacola, Florida.
- 41-15553 – PT-22 on display at the Mid-Atlantic Air Museum in Reading, Pennsylvania.
- 41-15654 – PT-22 on display at the Vintage Flying Museum in Fort Worth, Texas.
- 41-15721 – PT-22 on static display at the National Museum of the United States Air Force in Dayton, Ohio.
- 41-15736 – PT-22 on static display at the Pima Air & Space Museum in Pima, Arizona.
- 41-15744 – PT-22 on static display at the Pioneer Air Museum in Fairbanks, Alaska.
- 41-20652 – PT-22 on static display at the Main Campus of the Air Zoo in Kalamazoo, Michigan.
- 41-20850 – PT-22 on static display at the Castle Air Museum in Atwater, California.
- 41-20922 – PT-22 on static display at the Frontiers of Flight Museum in Dallas, Texas.
- 41-20940 – PT-22 on static display at the Science Museum Oklahoma in Oklahoma City, Oklahoma.
- 41-20952 – PT-22 on static display at the Evergreen Aviation & Space Museum in McMinnville, Oregon.
- 41-21039 – PT-22 on static display at the Museum of Aviation in Warner Robins, Georgia.
- 41-21011 – PT-22 on static display at the Florida Air Museum in Lakeland, Florida.
- 42-57481 – PT-22A on static display at the Udvar-Hazy Center of the National Air and Space Museum in Chantilly, Virginia.
- 42-57492 – PT-22A in storage at the New England Air Museum in Windsor Locks, Connecticut.

== Surviving aircraft ==
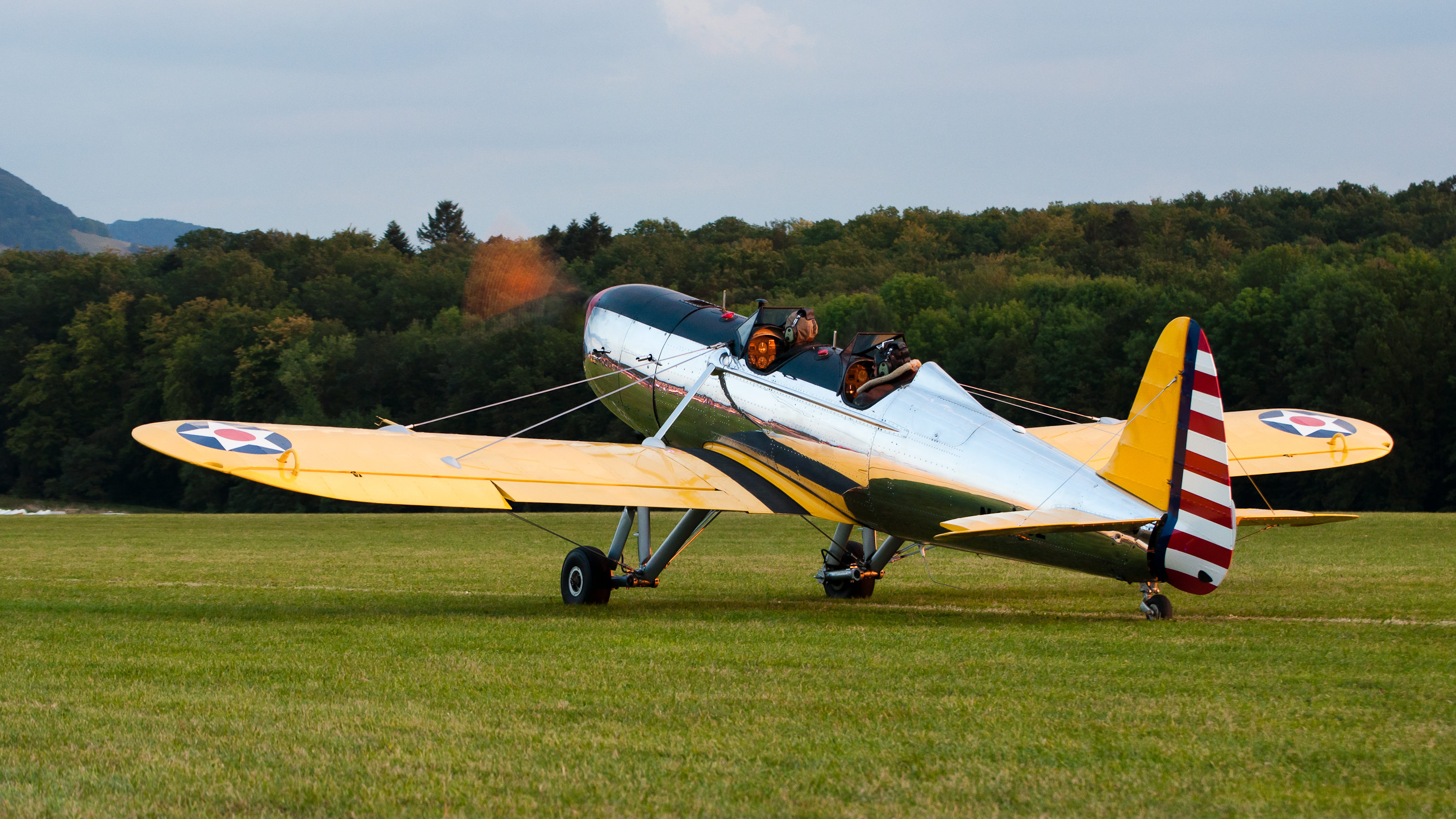
Ryan PT-22 Recruit

- 41-1902 – PT-22 airworthy at the Commemorative Air Force Minnesota Wing in South St. Paul, Minnesota.
- 41-15277 – PT-22 airworthy at the Fagen Fighters WWII Museum in Granite Falls, Minnesota.
- 41-15735 – PT-22 airworthy at the Western Antique Aeroplane & Automobile Museum in Hood River, Oregon.
- 41-20603 – PT-22 airworthy at the Port Townsend Aero Museum in Port Townsend, Washington.
- 41-20679 – PT-22 airworthy with the Commemorative Air Force Razorback Wing at the North Little Rock Municipal Airport in North Little Rock, Arkansas.
- 41-20855 – PT-22 airworthy with the Shuttleworth Collection at Old Warden, Bedfordshire.
- 41-20995 – PT-22 airworthy at the Tri-State Warbird Museum in Batavia, Ohio.

== Specifications (PT-22) ==
Data from Pilots Flight Operating Instructions and The New Ryan

General characteristics

- Crew: two (student and instructor)
- Capacity: 552 lb (250 kg) useful load
- Length: 22 ft 5 in (6.90 m)
- Wingspan: 30 ft 1 in (9.17 m)
- Height: 7 ft 2 in (2.18 m)
- Wing area: 134.25 sq ft (12.5 m^{2})
- Airfoil: NACA 2412
- Empty weight: 1,308 lb (593 kg)
- Gross weight: 1,860 lb (844 kg)
- Max takeoff weight: 1,860 lb (844 kg)
- Powerplant: 1 × Kinner R-540 , 160 hp (120 kW)

Performance

- Maximum speed: 125 mph (200 km/h, 109 kn)
- Cruise speed: 100 mph (160 km/h, 87 kn)
- Stall speed: 62 mph (100 km/h, 54 kn) flaps down 64 mph (103km/h, 56 kn) flaps up
- Never exceed speed: 190 mph (305 km/h, 170 kn)
- Range: 231 mi (371 km, 201 nmi) at 1560 RPM
- Service ceiling: 15,400 ft (4,700 m)
- Rate of climb: 710 ft/min (3.6 m/s) at max takeoff weight
- Wing loading: 13.6 lb/sq ft (66 kg/m^{2})

Armament

- none

Avionics

- none
