= Southern Railway 1509 =

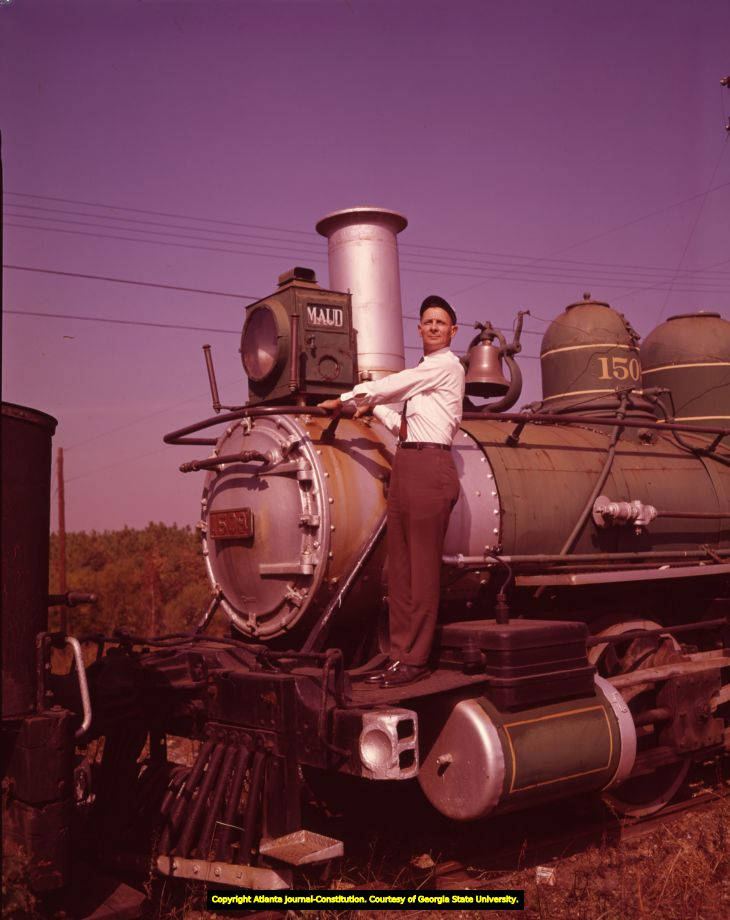
- No. 1509 in 1968
Type and origin
- Power type: Steam
- Builder: Baldwin Locomotive Works
- Serial number: 4909
- Build date: December 1879
- Rebuilder: Southern Railway
- Rebuild date: 1903
Specifications
- Configuration
  - Whyte: 0-4-4RT
  - UIC: B2′ t
- Gauge: 4 ft 8 1/2 in (1,435 mm)
- Driver dia.: 48 in (1.219 m)
- Loco weight: 111,000 lb (50 tonnes)
- Fuel type: Coal
- Boiler pressure: 135 lbf/in^{2} (0.93 MPa)
- Cylinders: Two, outside
- Cylinder size: 16 in × 24 in (406 mm × 610 mm)
- Valve gear: Walschaerts
- Valve type: Slide valve
- Loco brake: Air
- Train brakes: Air
- Couplers: Knuckle
Performance figures
- Tractive effort: 14,688 lbf (65.34 kN)
Career
- Operators: Atlanta and Charlotte Air Line Railway; Richmond and Danville Railroad; Southern Railway
- Class: A
- Numbers: A&CAL 27; SOU 1509
- Official name: Talullah; Maud
- Nicknames: Whiskers
- Locale: United States, South
- Retired: June 29, 1950
- Current owner: Southeastern Railway Museum
- Disposition: Stored, awaiting cosmetic restoration

Southern Railway "Maud" 1509 is an A class 0-4-4T "Forney" type steam locomotive and the oldest surviving steam locomotive of the Southern Railway. The engine was built by Baldwin in December 1879 for the Atlanta and Charlotte Air Line Railway, originally numbered 27 and named Talullah. The railroad was later absorbed by the Richmond and Danville Railroad which itself became the Southern Railway, and thus, Talullah ultimately became Southern No. 1509.

Very little is known about the engine's history prior to the 1903 renumbering and company records from that time are largely either missing, incomplete, and/or contain conflicting data. The 1509 was likely used for passenger service, particularly with suburban or commuter runs, and when renumbered, it received the A class designation, being a switcher engine used in yard service.

Southern rebuilt the engine in 1903, and from then until retirement, it served as a switcher for the railway's Pegram Shops in Atlanta. There, it was given the name, Maud by the shop employees. Maud was retired on June 29, 1950, and moved to Inman, Georgia, where it was to be scrapped. However, the shop's workers had favored Maud and wrote to then Southern Railway president Ernest E. Norris, requesting the engine to be preserved. Norris obliged, and Maud was placed on display outside of the shops until 1960. That year, the engine was donated to the Atlanta chapter of the National Railway Historical Society, who had placed it in their Southeastern Railway Museum in Duluth, Georgia.

As of November 2024, Southern Railway 1509 is stored at the Southeastern Railway Museum, awaiting a cosmetic restoration.
