= Southeastern Railway Museum =

- Georgia's Official Transportation History Museum

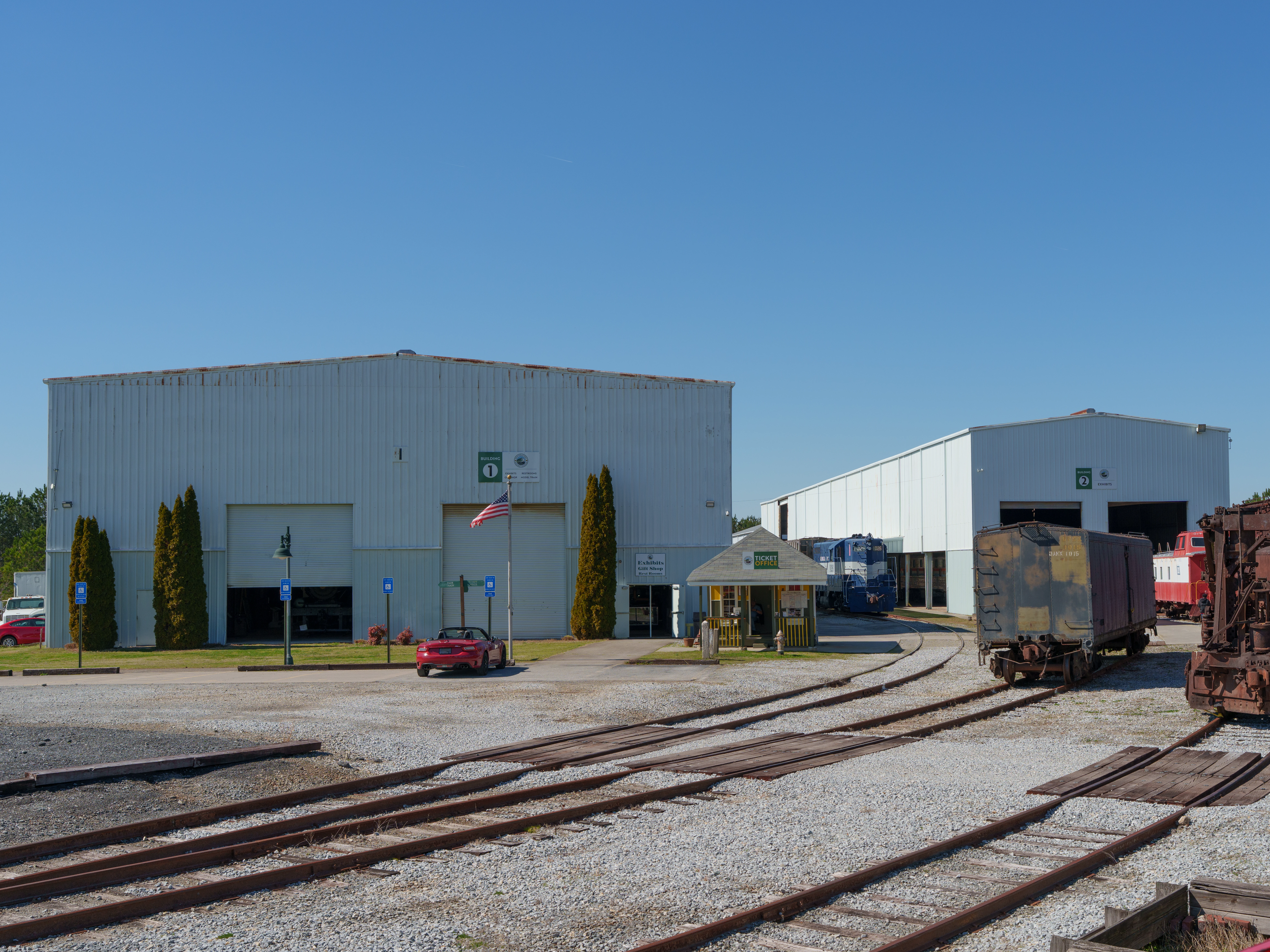
- Main exhibition buildings and ticket office
- Established: 1970 by the Atlanta Chapter of the National Railway Historical Society
- Location: 3595 Buford Hwy. Duluth, Georgia USA
- Coordinates: 33.988488°N 84.155797°W
- Type: Railroad and transportation Museum
- Collection size: over 90 pieces of rolling stock exhibited
- Website: https://www.train-museum.org/

The Southeastern Railway Museum (initialized SRM, AAR code SMRX) is a railroad museum located in Duluth, Georgia, in suburban Atlanta.

The museum was founded in 1970 by the Atlanta Chapter of the National Railway Historical Society. There are over 90 pieces of rolling stock exhibited on the 30-acre (12 ha) site. In 2000, the museum was given the title of being Georgia's official transportation history museum, and the collection of exhibits continues to diversify to reflect this.

In addition to the rolling stock there is a wide variety of railroad artifacts and an extensive archive. The grounds also contain the restored 1871 Duluth passenger train depot building, a G16/Park train ride, and a model railroad housed in Building 1. Visitors can also take a brief train ride on restored cabooses over track which runs the length of the property.

== Rolling stock collection ==
=== Steam Locomotives ===
Steam Locomotives
| Name | Class | Images | Manufacturer | Year built | Notes |
|---|---|---|---|---|---|
| Savannah and Atlanta 750 | 4-6-2 Light Pacific | | American Locomotive Company | 1910 | |
| Stone Mountain "General II" 104 | 4-4-0 | | Baldwin Locomotive Works | 1919 | |
| Chattahoochee Valley No. 21 | 2-8-0 | | Baldwin Locomotive Works | 1924 | |
| Heisler Campbell Limestone 9 | 2-Truck Heisler | | Heisler Locomotive Works | 1924 | |
| Southern Railway 1509 "Maud" | 0-4-4T | | Baldwin Locomotive Works | 1876 | Not on display. Visible from train ride. Awaiting cosmetic restoration. |
| Atlanta and West Point 290 | 4-6-2 Heavy Pacific | | Lima Locomotive Works | 1926 | Not on display. |
| Gainesville Midland No. 203 | 2-10-0 | External image | Baldwin Locomotive Works | 1928 | Not on display. Awaiting restoration. |
| Georgia Power No. 97 | USATC 0-6-0T | External image | H.K. Porter, Inc. | 1943 | Not on display. |

=== Diesel Locomotives ===
Diesel Locomotives
| Name | Class | Images | Manufacturer | Year built | Notes |
|---|---|---|---|---|---|
| Southeastern Railway Museum No. 3 | GE 50-Tonner | | General Electric | 1948 | Usually used to pull passengers at the museum. Previously called Hudson Bay Mining No. 101. Rebuilt with Cummins engines. |
| Southern Railway (SOU) No. 8202 | EMD SW7 | | Electro-Motive Diesel | c. 1950 | Sometimes used to pull passengers at the museum. |
| Georgia Railroad No. 1026 | EMD GP7 | | Electro-Motive Diesel | 1950 | |
| Southern Railway (SOU) No. 6901 | EMD E8 | | Electro-Motive Diesel | 1951 | Having been the very last SOU locomotive to pull the Southern Crescent, it was donated in 1979. From 2015 to 2019, it went to Norfolk Southern's (NS) Juniata Shops in Altoona, Pennsylvania, for extensive electrical, motor, and wheel work. Newly repainted and restored in 2026 with funds granted from NS, the Pace Family Foundation, and the Fast Track to the Future. |
| CSX No. 8954 | EMD SD45-2 | | Electro-Motive Diesel | 1974 | Originally built as Seaboard Coast Line No. 2049. It was donated to the Museum by CSX in 2018. It is the very first SD45-2 to be preserved. Currently under restoration to operational condition, and eventually will be repainted back to its Seaboard Coast Line appearance. |
| Armco Steel B70 | Boxcab | External image | Baldwin-Westinghouse | 1929 | Not on display. Claimed to be the oldest Baldwin-built diesel still surviving. |
| New York, Ontario and Western Railway No. 104 | General Electric 44-ton switcher | | General Electric | 1941 | Not on display. |
| Hartwell Railroad No. 2 | General Electric 44-ton switcher | External image | General Electric | 1950 | Not on display. |
| Louisville & Nashville No. 2326 | Modified ALCO S-4 | | ALCO | 1951 | Not on display. Visible from train ride. |
| Southern Railway No. 2594 | EMD GP30 | | Electro-Motive Diesel | c. 1962 | Not on display here. On long-term lease to the Tennessee Valley Railroad Museum. |

=== Passenger cars ===
Passenger cars
| Name | Images | Manufacturer | Year built | Notes |
|---|---|---|---|---|
| Norfolk Southern/Central of Georgia No. NS 30 "Marco Polo" / "Savannah" | External image | Pullman Company | 1927 | Private Car used by U.S. President Franklin D. Roosevelt between the years of 1933 and 1940. It was most recently used by Union Pacific (UP) behind Big Boy No. 4014's train during its East Coast tour in 2026. |
| Seaboard Coast Line Railroad No. 301 "Superb" | | Pullman Company | 1911 | Private Car used by U.S. Presidents Warren G. Harding and Woodrow Wilson |
| Atlantic Coast Line Railroad Sleeper/Lounge "Washington Club" | External image | Pullman Company | 1930 | Closed pending restoration. |
| Clinchfield Railroad Bar/Lounge car No. 112 | | | | Stored and closed. Originally carried baggage and steel for Louisville & Nashville as L&N No. 1416. Was converted to a "bar car" in 1970. Donated to the museum in 1993 and served as a meeting and party car for some time. |
| Southern Railway Diner No. 3168 | | Pullman Company | 1926 | Features original kitchen and 48 dining seats. |
| Southern Railway Coach No. 3780 | | Pullman Company | 1922 | Painted and lettered as New Georgia Railroad No. 1104 |
| Southern Railway Coach No. 812 "Charlottesville" | External image | Pullman Company | 1940 | Exterior exhibit only. |
| Southern Railway Coach No. 1212 | | Pullman Company | 1917 | Exterior exhibit only. Modified with partitions in 1940 to segregate races. |
| Southern Railway Coach No. 1078 | | Pullman Company | 1922 | Exterior exhibit only. |
| Central of Georgia Coach No. 527 | | Pullman Company | 1924 | Exterior exhibit only. |
| Central of Georgia Coach No. 651 | External image | Bethlehem Steel | 1937 | Stored and closed. Painted and lettered as New Georgia Railroad No. 1111. |
| Central of Georgia Coach No. 662 | External image | American Car and Foundry Company | 1946 | On lease to the Tennessee Valley Railroad Museum, AAR reporting mark SMRX 662 |
| Atlantic Coast Line Business car No. 307 | | Pullman Company | 1924 | Currently painted and lettered as SMRX No. 307 "Georgia On My Mind" |
| Southern Railway 10-1-2 sleeper "Thomas Ruffin" | | Pullman Company | 1929 | Exterior exhibit only. |
| Southern Railway 10-6 sleeper No. 2019 "Tugalo River" | | Pullman Company | 1949 | Closed pending restoration. Currently lettered as Norfolk Southern "NS17" |
| Amtrak 24-8 Slumbercoach No. 2092 "Loch Arkaig" | | Budd Company | 1959 | |
| USAX Troop kitchen car No. 200 | | American Car and Foundry Company | 1944 | |

=== Head-end equipment ===
Head-end equipment
| Name | Images | Manufacturer | Year built | Notes |
|---|---|---|---|---|
| Central of Georgia Railway Baggage car No. 405 | | Pullman Company | 1916 | Originally a cavalry horse carrier. Converted to baggage car, then to a commissary car. Donated 1968. |
| Southern Railway RPO No. 1701 "Grand Junction" | External image | Pullman Company | 1941 | Built for the Tennessean passenger train. RPO section is 60', baggage compartment is 20'. Donated 1970. |
| Southern Railway RPO/Baggage car No. 153 | | Bethlehem Steel | 1928 | Not on display. In use as archive storage. Half post office, half baggage compartment. Ran on the passenger train "Royal Palm" between Atlanta and Jacksonville. Donated in 1968. |
| Southern Railway Baggage car No. 116 | | Pullman Company | 1922 | Not on display. There is a restroom on board, since it was a staffed car called a "messenger". The star beside the number indicates that it is a staffed car. |
| Southern Railway Baggage car No. 451 | | Pullman Company | c. 1950 | Not on display. Library car. Tourist Sleeper Pullman no. 6031; converted to Baggage Express 451 in c. 1950, 80'. In use as air-conditioned archive storage. |
| Southern Railway Baggage car No. 582 "Benburb" | | Pullman Company | 1920 | Not on display. Built as a one drawing room sleeper. Converted to tourist sleeper #2438 in 1942. Converted to baggage car 1948. Donated 1972. |
| Southern Railway Baggage car No. 4529 "Dorado" | | Pullman Company | 1918 | In process of restoration, as of February 2026. Built for NO&NE as 12 section 1 drawing room sleeper. Converted to tourist sleeper #3009 in 1937. Converted to baggage car in 1955. Donated in 1971. |
| Southern Railway Baggage car No. 6457 "Point Noire" | | Pullman Company | 1926 | Not on display. Converted by Southern to baggage express car No. 6204 in the 1950s and assigned to GS&F. |

=== Freight cars ===
Freight cars
| Name | Images | Manufacturer | Year built | Notes |
|---|---|---|---|---|
| L&N (H.P. Hood and Sons) milk tank car No. 40605 | | General American-Pfaudler | c. 1943 to 1949 | Originally GPEX#1015. Thought to be only 15-25 cars left in the nation. |
| Seaboard Air Line boxcar No. 9028 | External image | Pressed Steel Car Company | 1926 | Originally built as a gondola, rebuilt as a boxcar in 1936 by Seaboard Air Line. |
| Fruit Growers Express reefer No. 55558 | | Fruit Growers Express | c. 1940 | |
| Central of Georgia Railway Bulkhead flat No. 11403 | | Thrall Car Manufacturing Company | 1965 | In storage. Two engine hoods from Hartwell 2, and the cab from Atlanta and West Point 290 are on this car |
| Norfolk Southern coal hopper car No. 993359MW | | N&W Roanoke Shops | 1964 | One of 280 class H11A units. ex-Norfolk & Western 94309. Used for coal service until 1994. |
| GATX Kaolin tank car No. 40649 | | | | Donated to the museum in 2008. |
| DODX heavy duty flat car No. 38416 | | | 1953 | 200,000 pound capacity. Designed to transport two tanks. |
| Southern Railway flat car No. 117092 | External image | Southern Railway | 1926 | Donated in 1963. 500 built. |
| Southern Railway hopper No. 74745 | | | 1966 | Three bays. |
| Norfolk and Western gondola No. 99984 | | Virginia Bridge Works | 1940 | Donated in 1963. |
| Southern Railway gondola No. 900097 | | | 1938 | |
| Southern Railway gondola No. 291069 | External image | | 1958 | |
| Southern Railway boxcar No. 33309 | External image | | 1965 | Weighs 56,400 pounds unloaded |
| Chattahoochee Valley boxcar No. 1010 | External image | | 1959 | Purchased from Chattahoochee Valley Railroad for use as storage. |
| Chattahoochee Valley boxcar No. 1011 | | | between 1957 and 1969 | Purchased from Chattahoochee Valley Railroad for use as storage. |
| Chattahoochee Valley boxcar No. 9012 | External image | | 1965 | Purchased from Chattahoochee Valley Railroad for use as storage. |
| Chattahoochee Valley boxcar No. 9014 | | | between 1957 and 1969 | Purchased from Chattahoochee Valley Railroad for use as storage. |
| Chattahoochee Valley boxcar No. 98703 | | | 1957 | Purchased from Chattahoochee Valley Railroad for use as storage. |
| Chattahoochee Valley boxcar No. 98705 | External image | | 1969 | Purchased from Chattahoochee Valley Railroad for use as storage. |
| Chattahoochee Valley boxcar No. 98707 | External image | | 1962 | Purchased from Chattahoochee Valley Railroad for use as storage. |
| Chattahoochee Valley boxcar No. 98708 | | | between 1957 and 1969 | Purchased from Chattahoochee Valley Railroad for use as storage. |

Additionally, the following freight cars have been photographed on museum grounds for several years, but are unsourced as to whether or not they technically belong to the museum's permanent collection:

- Southern Railway "Big John" hopper car No. 8717
- Southern Railway 86' boxcar No. 9690

=== Cabooses ===
Cabooses
| Name | Images | Manufacturer | Year built | Notes |
|---|---|---|---|---|
| Southern Railway Transfer caboose No. XC7871 | | | c. 1950s | Previously used to transfer workers and their equipment. Donated in 1980. Now used as the middle car on the train ride. |
| Norfolk and Western No. 500837 | | Pittsburgh and West Virginia Railway | 1944 | Commonly the final caboose on the train ride. ex-Pittsburg & West Virginia #837. Class C19. Donated 1989. |
| Central of Georgia Wood caboose No. X92 | | Central of Georgia | 1916 | Converted to Caboose in 1942. Donated 1970. |
| Seaboard Coast Line No. 01077 | | | 1970 | Steel class M6 caboose, donated 1997. |
| Southern Railway Wood caboose No. 2156 | | Southern Railway | 1915 | Not on display. Previously used by Vulcan Materials. Donated in 1979. |
| Georgia Railroad No. 2866 | External image | Georgia Railroad | c. 1941 to 1945 | On exhibit near buses. Converted from box car during World War II. Steel caboose. Previously used to carry passengers between Augusta and Athens. |
| Georgia Railroad Steel braced wood caboose No. 2849 | External image | Georgia Railroad | 1941 | Not on display. Built during the World War II steel shortage. Frame and ends are from a 1923 box car. Donated 1972. |
| Clinchfield Railroad No. 1064 | | Thrall Car Manufacturing Company | 1952 | ex-Monon #81515. ex-L&N #915. Replaced Clinchfield's original #1064 which burned in a fire. Donated 1985. |

=== Maintenance-of-way equipment ===
Maintenance-of-way equipment
| Name | Images | Manufacturer | Year built | Notes |
|---|---|---|---|---|
| Chattahoochee Valley flatcar with burro crane No. 522 | | Industrial Brownhoist | | Previously used for light maintenance of railroad infrastructure. |
| Jordan Spreader No. JX635 | | O. F. Jordan Company | 1926 | Previously used to spread the rock ballast that supports rail ties. Could also cut drainage ditches. |
| Western Union tool car No. 3558-AB | | Western Union | 1929 | Restored in 2018 and displayed in building 1. |
| Seaboard Air Line bunk car No. F70413 | | Seaboard Air Line Railroad | c. 1930 | Contained coal stove, shower, ice box, and six bunk beds. Made of wood. |
| USAX self-propelled crane No. C-271 | | American DiesElectric | 1953 | 50-ton self-propelled crane used by the Army Transportation Corps. |
| WofA Pile driver No. 20 and boom car No. 7001 | | Industrial Brownhoist | 1929 | Pile driver had 33 inch wheels and a tractive effort of 8000 pounds. |
| WofA tender No. 7302 | | Industrial Brownhoist | 1929 | Goes with WofA Pile driver No. 20. Capacity of 12 tons of coal and 7000 gallons of water. |

=== Miscellaneous rolling stock ===
Miscellaneous rolling stock
| Name | Images | Manufacturer | Year built | Notes |
|---|---|---|---|---|
| L&N M-1 Berkshire Tender No. 1966 "Big Emma" | | Baldwin Locomotive Works | 1944 | Tender from L&N No. 1966, a Louisville and Nashville class M-1 (2–8–4) locomotive. The engine was scrapped in 1956, but the tender survived. |
| L&N Auxiliary Water Tender No. 279 | | ALCO-Brooks | 1924 | Converted from coal tender of L&N No. 279, a USRA Light Pacific (4–6–2) locomotive, K-5 Brooks. JLDX No. 55. |

== Transit equipment ==
=== Rail vehicles ===
Rail vehicles
| Name | Images | Manufacturer | Year built | Notes |
|---|---|---|---|---|
| Metropolitan Atlanta Rapid Transit Authority CQ310 heavy rail car No. 509 | | Société Franco-Belge | 1981 | 75 foot aluminum body, 46 passenger capacity. Donated in 2022. |
| Georgia Railway and Power Company streetcar No. 269 | External image | Cincinnati Car Company | 1921 | Stored outside pending restoration in front of SOU 1509 "Maud". Used on the Decatur line between 1921 and 1948. |
| Georgia Railway and Power Company streetcar No. 636 | | Georgia Railway and Power Company | 1924 | Stored outside pending restoration. Can be seen near the end of the train ride behind SOU 1509 "Maud". Height 9 feet 10 inches (3 meters). |

=== Rubber-tired vehicles ===
Rubber-tired vehicles
| Name | Images | Manufacturer | Year built | Notes |
|---|---|---|---|---|
| Atlanta Transit System Trackless trolley No. 1296 | External image | Pullman Company | 1946 or 1947 | Not on display. |
| Atlanta Transit System Trackless trolley No. 1732 | | St. Louis Car Company | 1949 | |
| Atlanta Transit System Trackless trolley No. 1756 | External image | St. Louis Car Company | 1949 | Not on display. |
| BC Transit T-48 Trackless trolley No. 2207 | | CCF-Brill | 1950 | Not on display. 48 seats. |
| Atlanta Airport Automated People Mover No. 1 | External image | Westinghouse | 1980 | Westinghouse C-100. On display next to the rideable train. |
| Atlanta Airport Automated People Mover No. 53 | External image | Westinghouse | 1980 | Westinghouse C-100 |
| CobbLinc RTS bus No. 8956 | | GMC | 1989 | |
| Ride Gwinnett Orion VII 32.5' CNG bus No. B014 (Note: Not publicly disclosed if this bus is part of the museum's permanent collection.) | | Orion Bus Industries | 2002 | Entered service 2003. |

=== MARTA-owned vehicles ===
MARTA-owned vehicles
| Name | Images | Manufacturer | Year built | Notes |
|---|---|---|---|---|
| Georgia Power Company bus No. 401 | | White Motor Company | 1941 | In use 1941 to 1960. |
| Atlanta Transit Company "Old Look" bus No. 253 | | General Motors | 1953 | "Old Look" bus, first introduced in 1940 by Yellow Coach Manufacturing Company prior to their acquisition by GM. In use 1954 to 1974. |
| Atlanta Transit System "New Look" bus No. 946, "Fishbowl" | | General Motors | 1963 | Second generation "New Look" bus. In use 1963 to 1983. |
| MARTA "New Look" bus No. 4211, "Fishbowl" | | General Motors | 1974 | Fourth generation "New Look" bus. |
| MARTA Flxible Metro bus No. 3360 | | Flxible | 1988 | This model Flxible Metro bus was manufactured between 1983 and 1995. In use 1988 to 2003. |
| MARTA New Flyer 40' CNG bus No. 2701 | | New Flyer | 1996 | New Flyer C40LF, runs on compressed natural gas. |
| Mule streetcar No. 1866 | External image | | | Not currently on display. |

== Special events ==
The museum hosts a series of annual special events, including Caboose Days in April, the Fast Track 5K in May, Locomotive Celebration in June, Trains, Trucks & Tractors in August and Classics at the Crossing in October.

== See also ==
- List of heritage railroads in the United States
