= Pioneer Air Museum =

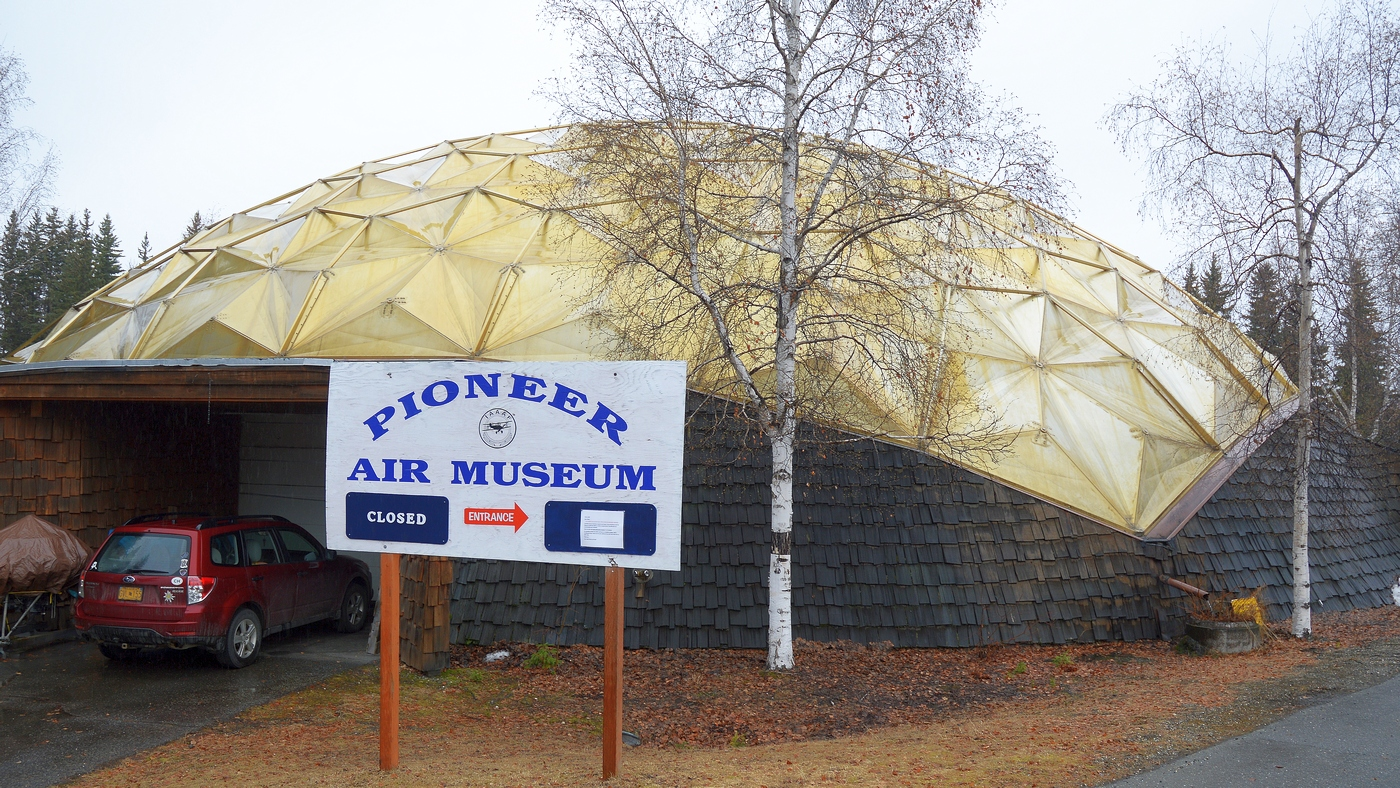

- Location within Alaska
- Established: 1982
- Location: Fairbanks, Alaska
- Coordinates: 64.8395°N 147.7750°W
- Type: Aviation museum
- Founders: Randy Acord; Corky Corkran; Everett Long; Dr. William Wood
- Website: www.pioneerair.museum

The Pioneer Air Museum is an aviation museum located at Pioneer Park in Fairbanks, Alaska.

== History ==
The Interior and Arctic Alaska Aeronautical Foundation was organized by Randy Acord, Corky Corkran, Everett Long and Dr. William Wood in 1977 and registered in 1982. The group was given permission to use the "Gold Dome" in 1984, but, due to various problems with the condition of the structure, the Pioneer Air Museum was initially unable to open. It was not until 1992, when the wreckage of Ben Eielson's Hamilton H-45 had been placed on display after being recovered from the Soviet Union, that the museum first admitted visitors.

By the end of 2022, the museum deaccessioned a number of aircraft not sufficiently related to its mission, including an Osprey Osprey 2, a RotorWay Scorpion, a Mitchell Wing B-10 and an Eipper Quicksilver in 2022.

In 2024, the museum announced it would be merging with the Fountainhead Antique Auto Museum.

== Facilities ==
The museum is located in the "Gold Dome", a 12,000 sq ft (1,100 m^{2}) structure built as an ice skating rink for the Alaska 67 Centennial Exposition in 1967.

== Exhibits ==
Exhibits at the museum include a Curtiss-Wright flight trainer.

== Collection ==
- Bakeng Duce
- Beechcraft UC-45F Expeditor
- Bell UH-1H Iroquois
- Fairchild 24 J
- Fokker Super Universal – wreckage
- Noorduyn UC-64A Norseman
- Piper PA-18-150 Super Cub
- Rutan VariEze
- Ryan PT-22 Recruit
- Stinson Junior
- Stinson V-77
