= Harding Railroad Car =

- U.S. National Register of Historic Places
- Alaska Heritage Resources Survey
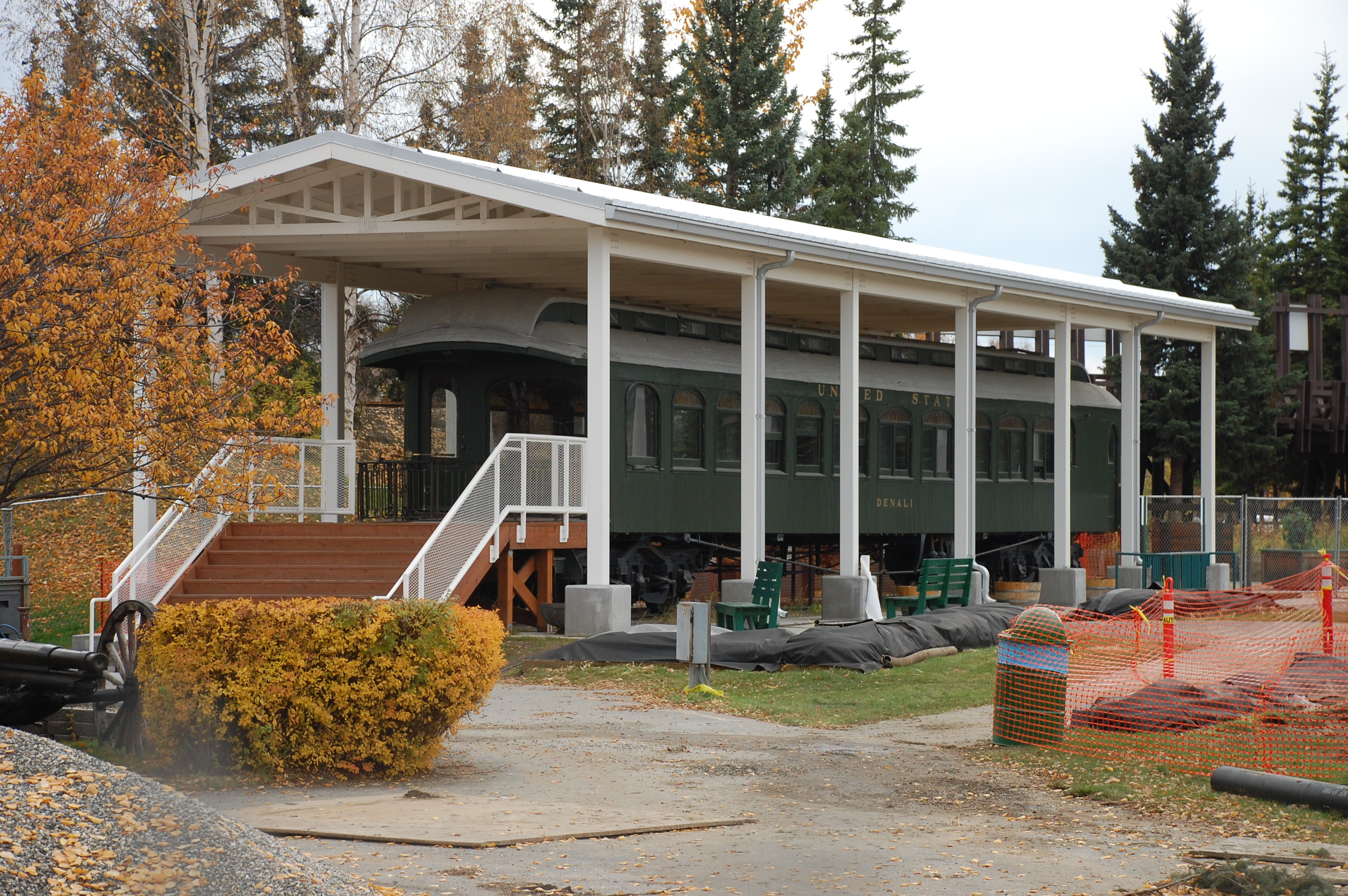

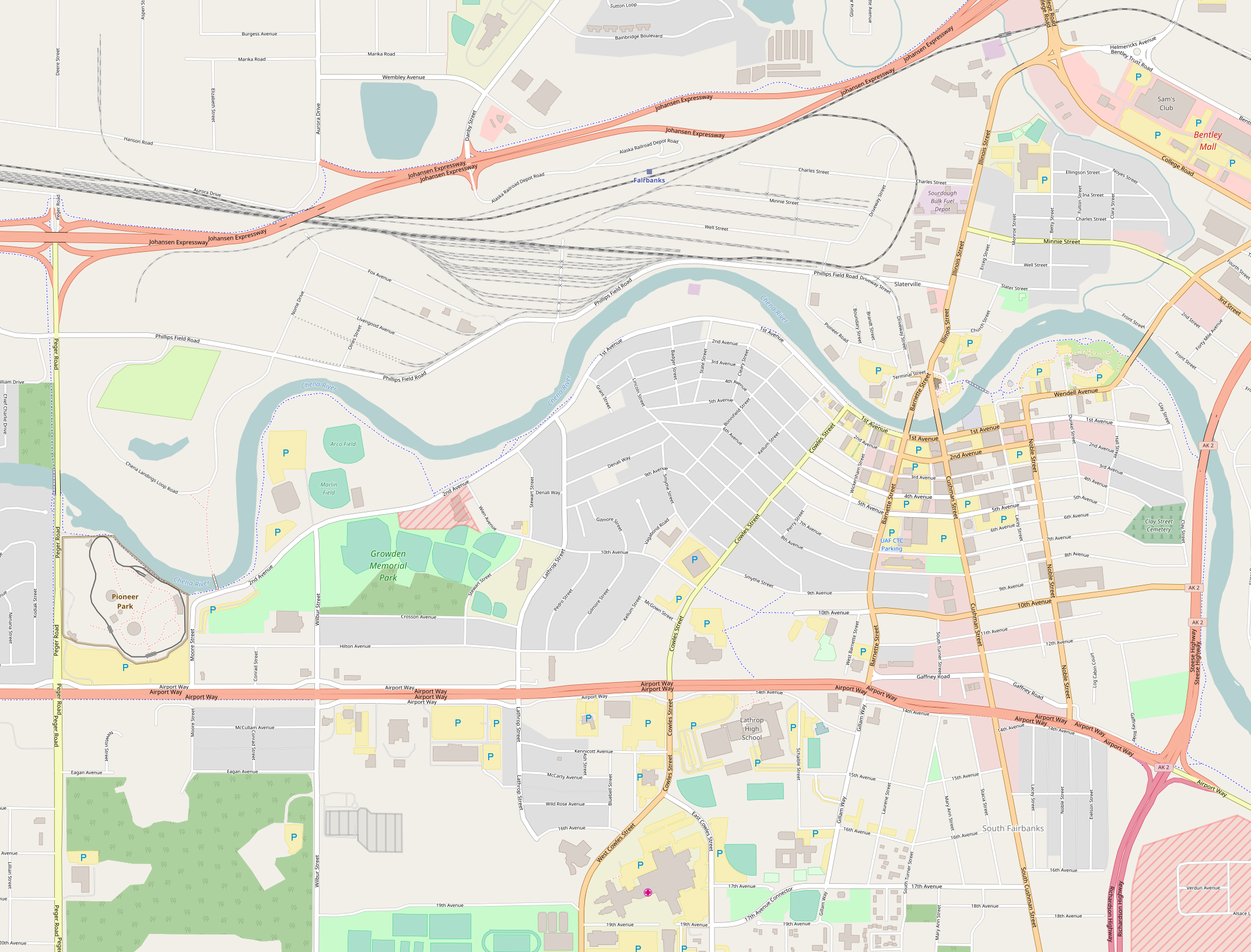
- Location within Downtown Fairbanks Location within Alaska
- Location: Pioneer Park, Fairbanks, Alaska
- Coordinates: 64°50′17″N 147°46′20″W
- Area: less than one acre (0.40 ha)
- Built by: Pullman Palace Car Company
- NRHP reference No.: 78003423
- AHRS No.: FAI-103

Significant dates
- Added to NRHP: April 6, 1978
- Designated AHRS: November 26, 1976

The Harding Railroad Car is a historically significant Pullman railroad passenger car located at Pioneer Park (aka Alaskaland) in Fairbanks, Alaska. Also called Denali, and designated with equipment number X-336 by the Alaska Railroad, the car was one of three used to carry a delegation that included President Warren G. Harding in 1923 to the Mears Memorial Bridge for a ceremony marking completion of the railroad between Fairbanks and Seward. The car was purchased by the Alaska Railroad in 1923 from the Great Northern Railway, and was used in its service until 1945. At the urging of the Fairbanks "igloo" (chapter) of the Pioneers of Alaska, the car was restored in 1959–60 and given to the city of Fairbanks. It was placed in Alaskaland in 1967, created to mark the centennial of the Alaska Purchase. It was used for some years as the park's visitor center.

The car was listed on the National Register of Historic Places in 1978.

Another car, The Superb, carried Harding's remains after he died in San Francisco.

== See also ==
- Ferdinand Magellan (railcar)
- National Register of Historic Places listings in Fairbanks North Star Borough, Alaska
