= Pioneer Park (Fairbanks, Alaska) =

Borough park in Fairbanks, Alaska

Coordinates: 64.8394°N 147.7746°W

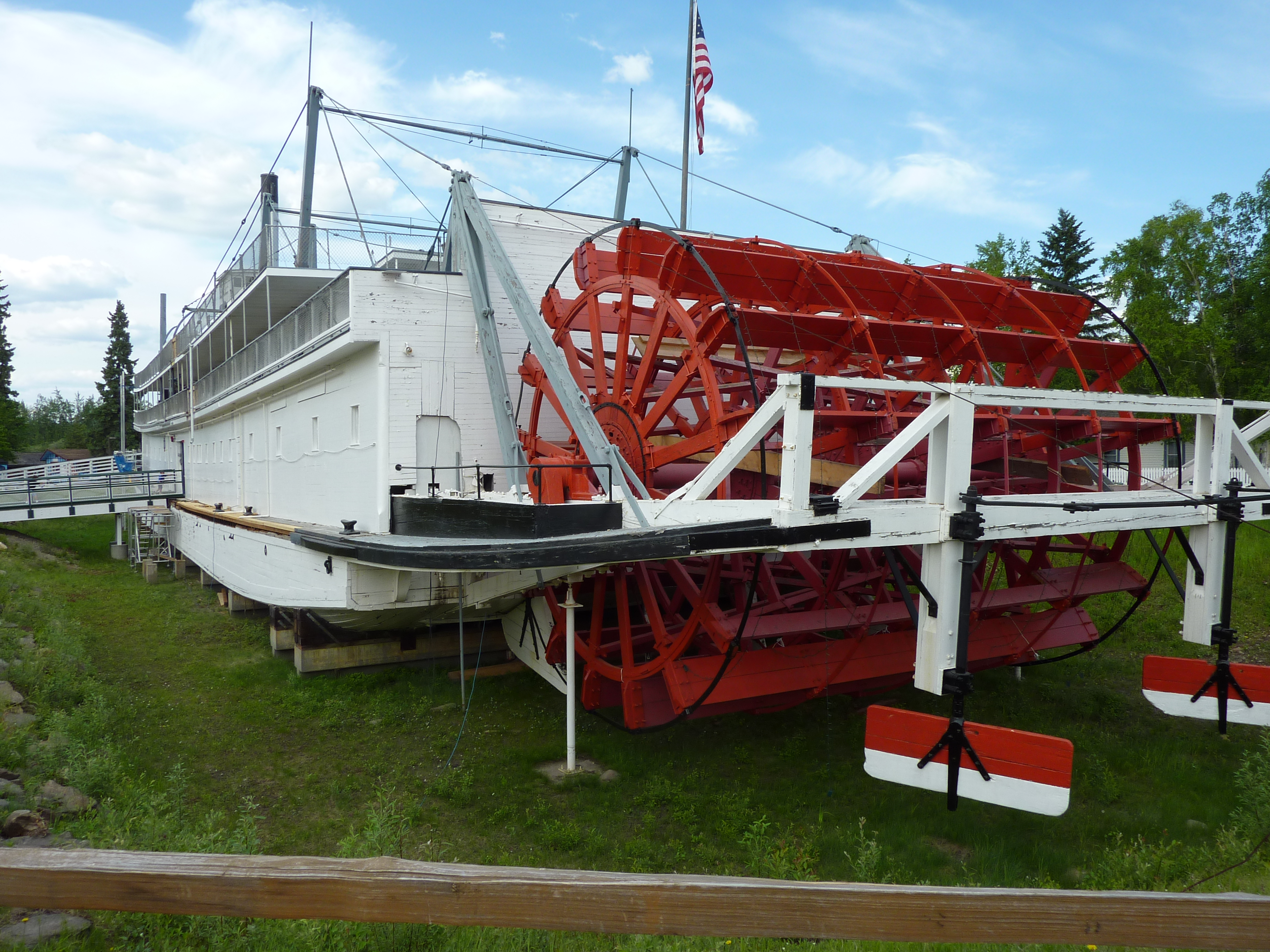
SS Nenana, sternwheeler in Pioneer Park, Fairbanks, 2011.

Pioneer Park is a 44-acre (109-ha) city park in Fairbanks, Alaska, United States run by the Fairbanks North Star Borough Department of Parks and Recreation. The park commemorates Alaskan history with multiple museums and historic displays on site. The park is located along the Chena River and is accessible from Peger and Airport Roads. A waterfront path connects the park to the Carlson Center, Growden Memorial Park and downtown Fairbanks. There is no admission fee to enter the park, though many of the museums and attractions do charge an entrance fee. Concessions are open from Memorial Day weekend through Labor Day, though the park is open year-round and some events are held in the off-season.

== History ==
Pioneer Park was opened in 1967 as Alaska 67 Centennial Exposition to celebrate the centennial of the Alaska Purchase. After being given first to the state and then to the city, Mayor Red Boucher renamed the site Alaskaland. It was then changed to its present name in 2001 out of concern that the park could be mistaken for being primarily a theme park. On April 23, 2026, The Fairbanks North Star Borough Assembly voted 7–2 to revert the name of the park to Alaskaland. This change will take effect on September 4, 2026.

== Attractions ==
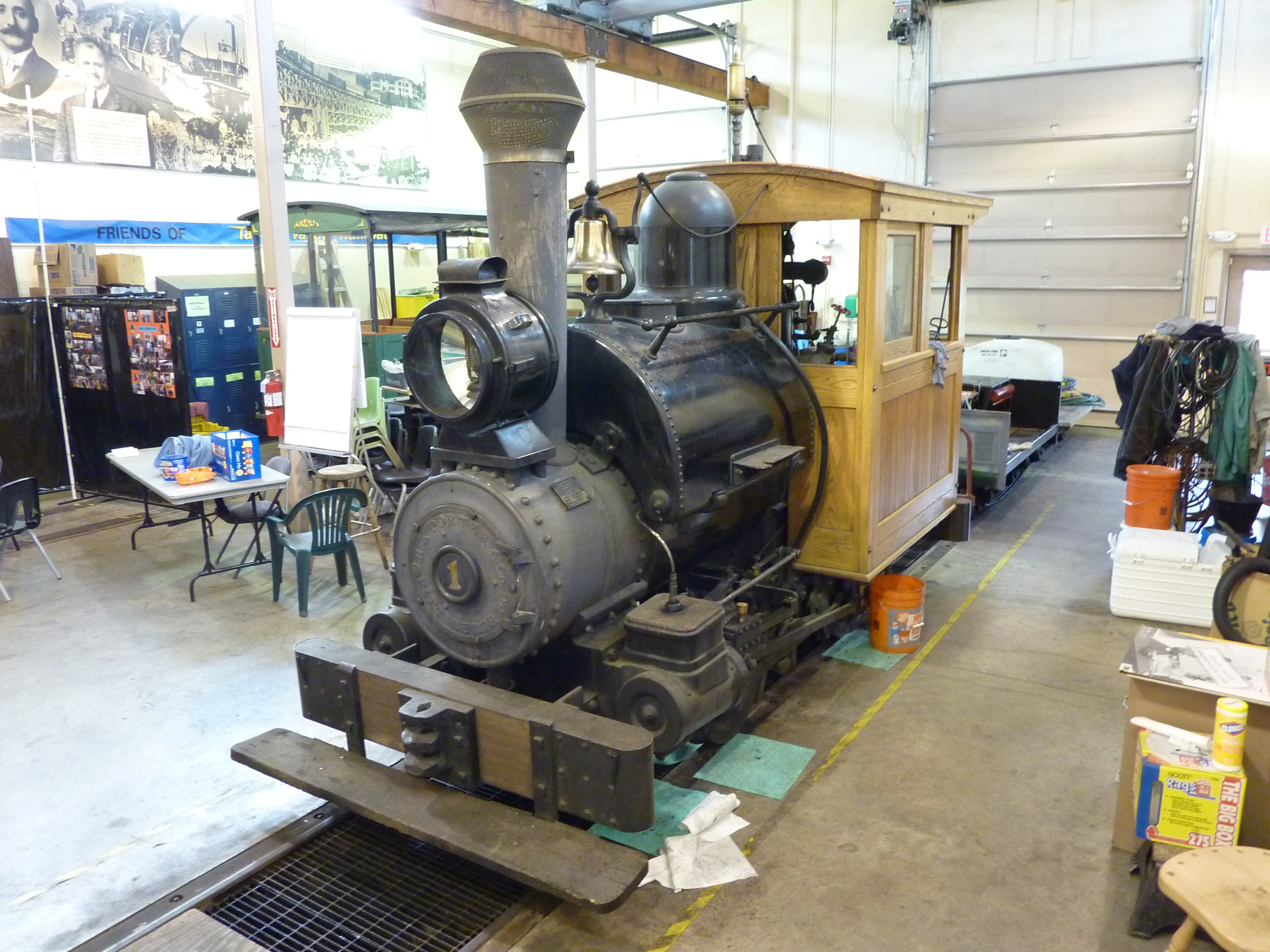
Tanana Valley Steam Locomotive No. 1 in Pioneer Park, Fairbanks, 2011.

- Alaska Centennial Center for the Arts – theater, art gallery, and meeting hall.
- Crooked Creek & Whiskey Island Railroad – operating 3 ft (914 mm) narrow gauge railroad which circumnavigates the park.
- Denali Observation car (or "Harding Railroad Car") – the rail car used by President Warren G. Harding during a visit to Alaska in 1923 to formally complete the Alaska Railroad.
- Fairbanks Arts Association – a non-profit organization set up to promote contemporary and traditional arts in Interior Alaska. The gallery is open to the public year-round on the third floor of the Centennial Center.
- Gold Rush Town – 35 restored buildings from early Fairbanks, including the first church in Fairbanks and a house owned by Judge James Wickersham. There are also several food vendors serving the public. Souvlaki, Cheechako's Tacos, and Sourdough Dan's Pizza. As well as several Ice Cream and gift shops to visit.
- Mini Golf Fairbanks – America's northernmost 18 hole Mini Golf Course.
- Mining Valley – contains working replica of a gold rush-era sluice gate.
- Pioneer Air Museum – aviation memorabilia and 14 aircraft; begun through the efforts of aviation historian Randy Acord.
- Pioneer Hall – designed to resemble an early-20th-century meeting hall. Includes the Pioneer Museum, which features Gold Rush memorabilia and the "Big Stampede" mural presentation.
- Replica Alaska Native village featuring artifacts.
- Replica of the wheelhouse of SS Lavelle Young, the steamer used by Fairbanks founder E.T. Barnette to reach the site of the settlement.
- SS Nenana – a sternwheeler that carried passengers and cargo on the Tanana and Yukon rivers from 1933 to 1954. At 230 feet (70 m) it is the second-longest wooden-hulled ship still in existence. Now a museum.
- Tanana Valley Railroad Museum – opened in 2006 and features the restored, 3 ft (914 mm) narrow gauge 1899 TVRR Engine No. 1, the oldest working steam locomotive in Alaska and still operated on occasion by volunteers.

== Fairbanks Arts Association ==
The Fairbanks Arts Association is a non-profit organization, established in 1966, that displays contemporary and traditional Alaskan arts in Interior Alaska. It is the oldest community arts council in Alaska as well as serving as the official arts organization for both the Fairbanks North Star Borough and the City of Fairbanks, Alaska. The Fairbanks Arts Association provides services to local artists and arts organizations. Volunteers serve on standing committees of the Board, and help to steer the course of programming in performance, literary, visual, community, and educational arts. The gallery and main office is located on the third floor of the Alaska Centennial Center for Arts in Pioneer Park, and is open year-round.

They have a number of educational programs. One of these is the Artists-in-Schools program within the FNSBSD. The AIS residence enables artists to study traditional and contemporary art forms that include music, dance, traditional Alaska Native art, digital arts and more. They also have a program called the Very Special Arts (VSA) program. This is a day when special education students come to Pioneer Park for a hands-on art experience.

The association organize Literary Reading Series, inviting authors including Neville Abbott Jacobs in 2019.

== The Folk School ==
The folk school is a nonprofit organization that offers classes in a variety of hands-on disciplines, including woodworking, outdoor skills, and traditional crafts. Continuing with the tradition of folk schools, started by Nikolaj Grundtvig in Denmark, Fairbanks folk school is committed to non-hierarchical learning, where everyone learns from each other. The school has been operating since the early 2000s, and moved to Pioneer Park in 2018.

== See also ==
Other locations with historic trains in a non-historic setting:

- Clark's Trading Post
- Rail transport in Walt Disney Parks and Resorts
