= The Superb =

Superb
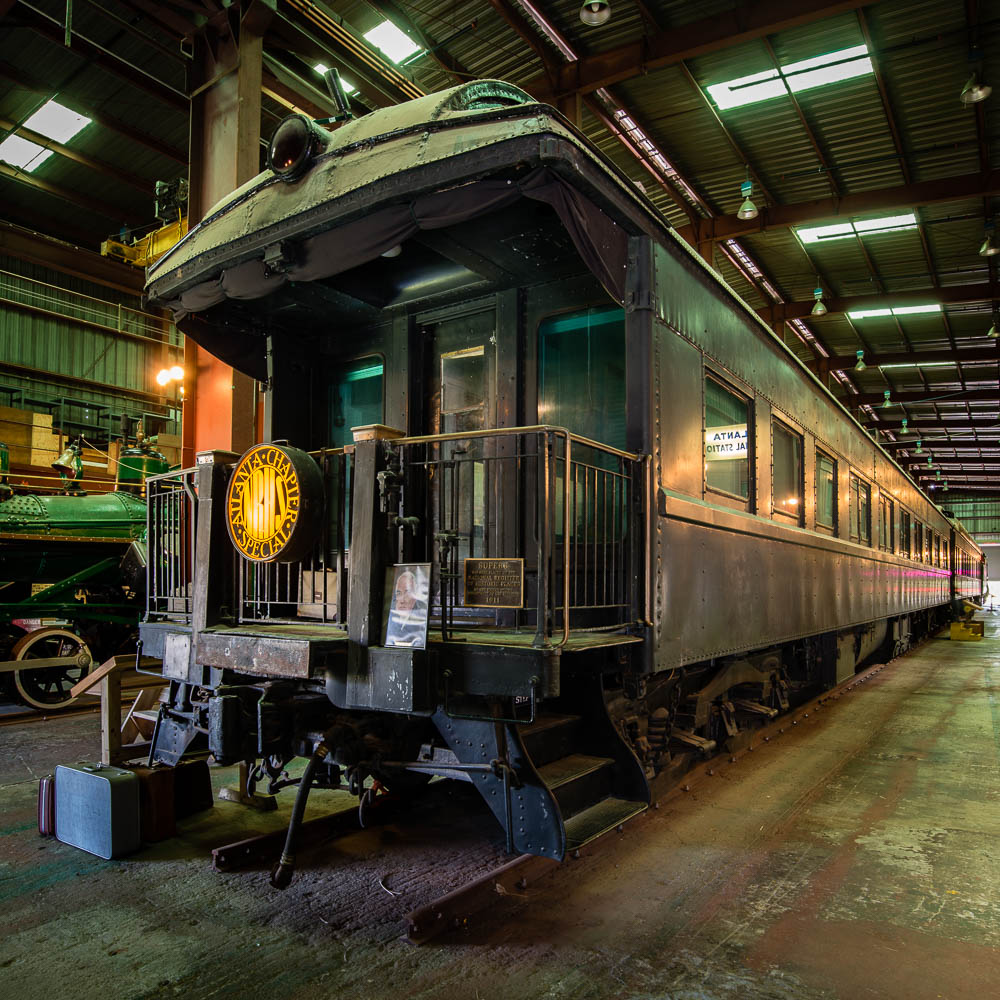
- Manufacturer: Pullman Company
- Order no.: Lot 3847
- Constructed: March 1911
- Diagram: Plan 2503

Specifications
- Track gauge: 4 ft 8 1/2 in (1,435 mm)

Notes/references
- Superb
- U.S. National Register of Historic Places
- Location within Metro Atlanta Location within Georgia Location within the United States
- Location: Duluth, Georgia
- Coordinates: 33°59′19″N 84°9′20″W
- Built: 1911
- Architect: Pullman Co.
- NRHP reference No.: 98001560
- Added to NRHP: March 9, 1999

The Superb was used as U.S. President Warren G. Harding's personal Pullman railroad car in a cross-country tour in 1923. After Harding's death, the car returned his body from San Francisco to Washington, D.C. Built in 1911, it is the second-oldest steel private car in existence. It had been used by Woodrow Wilson. In 1926 it was temporarily renamed Pope Pius XI for the Cardinal's Train from New York City to Chicago. Later it was an office car for the Charleston and West Carolina, Atlantic Coast Line and Seaboard Coast Line railroads.

The car was donated to the Southeastern Railway Museum in Duluth, Georgia in 1969 and opened to the public in 1995 after a 20-month restoration. It was placed on the National Register of Historic Places on March 9, 1998.

== See also ==
- Harding Railroad Car
