= History of Fairbanks, Alaska =

The history of Fairbanks, the second-largest city in Alaska, can be traced to the founding of a trading post by E.T. Barnette on the south bank of the Chena River on August 26, 1901. The area had seen human occupation since at least the last ice age, but a permanent settlement was not established at the site of Fairbanks until the start of the 20th century.

The discovery of gold near Barnette's trading post caused him to turn what had been a temporary stop into a permanent one. The gold caused a stampede of miners to the area, and buildings sprang up around Barnette's trading post. In November 1903, the area's residents voted to incorporate the city of Fairbanks. Barnette became the city's first mayor, and the city flourished as thousands of people came to search for gold during the Fairbanks Gold Rush.

By the time of World War I, the easy-to-reach gold was exhausted and Fairbanks' population plunged as miners moved to promising finds at Ruby and Iditarod. Construction of the Alaska Railroad caused a surge of economic activity and allowed heavy equipment to be brought in for further exploitation of Fairbanks' gold deposits. Enormous gold dredges were built north of Fairbanks, and the city grew throughout the 1930s as the price of gold rose during the Great Depression. A further boom came during the 1940s and 1950s as the city became a staging area for the construction of military depots during World War II and the first decade of the Cold War.

In 1968, the vast Prudhoe Bay Oil Field was discovered in Alaska's North Slope. Fairbanks became a supply point for exploitation of the oil field and for construction of the Trans-Alaska Pipeline System, which caused a boom unseen since the first years of Fairbanks' founding and helped the town recover from the devastating 1967 Fairbanks Flood. Fairbanks became a government center in the late 1960s with the establishment of the Fairbanks North Star Borough, which took Fairbanks as its borough seat. A drop in oil prices during the 1980s caused a recession in the Fairbanks area, but the city gradually recovered as oil prices climbed during the 1990s. Tourism also became an important factor in Fairbanks' economy, and the growth of the tourism industry and the city continues even as oil production declines.

== Before Fairbanks ==
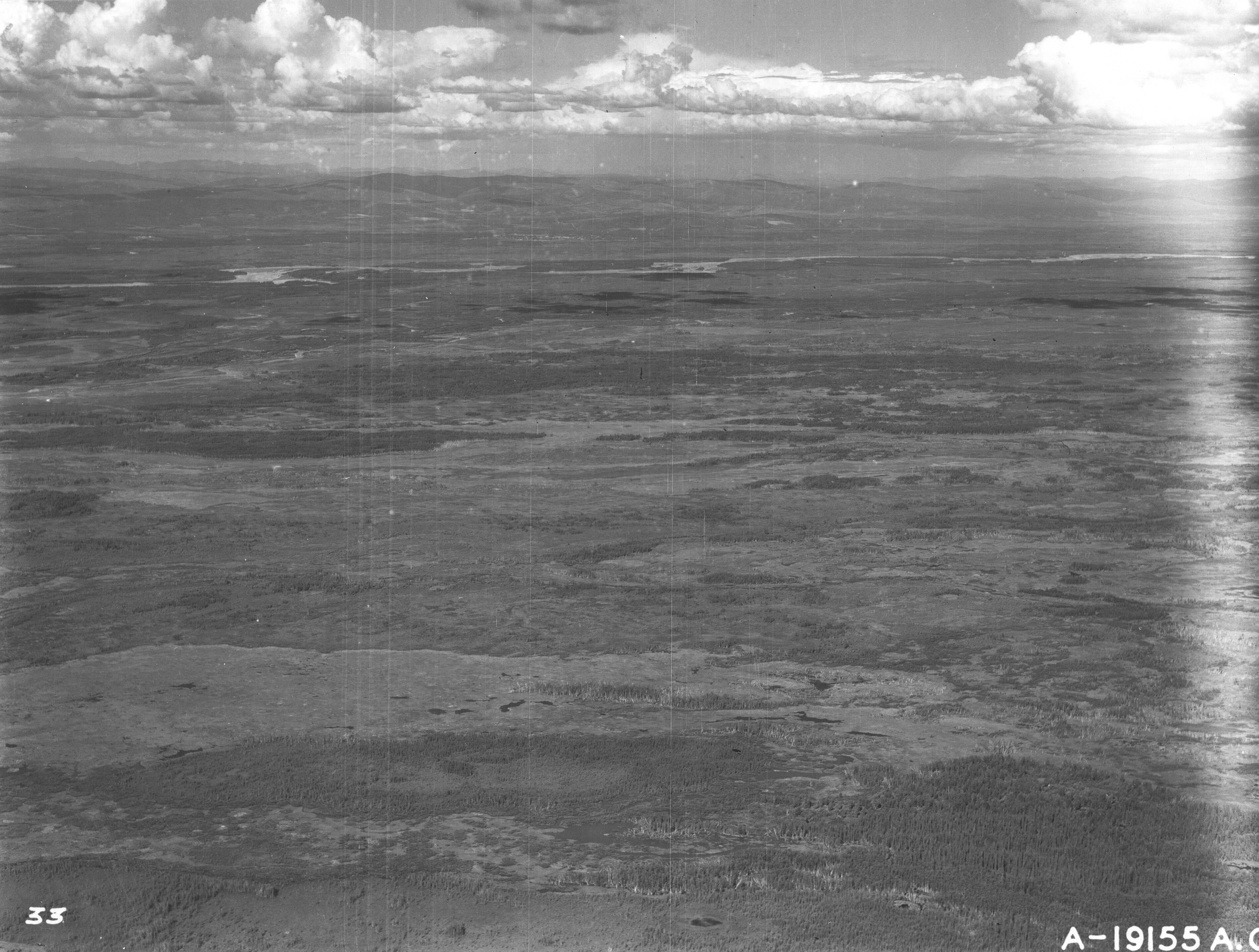
Landscape around Fairbanks

Though there was never a permanent Alaska Native settlement at the site of Fairbanks, Athabascan Indians have used the area for thousands of years. An archaeological site excavated on the grounds of the University of Alaska Fairbanks uncovered a Native camp about 3,500 years old. From evidence gathered at the site, archaeologists surmise that Native activities in the area were limited to seasonal hunting and fishing. In addition, archeological sites on the grounds of nearby Fort Wainwright date back 10,000 years. Arrowheads excavated from the University of Alaska Fairbanks site matched similar items found in Asia, providing some of the first evidence that humans arrived in North America via the land bridge.

The first recorded exploration of the Tanana Valley and the Tanana River did not take place until 1885, but historians believe Russian traders from Nulato and Hudson's Bay Company traders ventured into the lower reaches of the Tanana and possibly the Chena River in the middle of the 19th century. In 1885, Henry Tureman Allen of the U.S. Army led the first recorded expedition down the length of the Tanana River, charting the Chena River's mouth along the way.

In July 1897, the first news of the Klondike gold strike reached Seattle, Washington, triggering the Klondike Gold Rush. Thousands of people boarded steamships heading north to the goldfields. Some of these travelers sailed around the western tip of Alaska and up the Yukon River to Dawson City (site of the goldfields) rather than take an arduous overland trip across the Boundary Ranges.

One of these adventurers was E.T. Barnette, who intended to establish a trading post at Tanacross, Alaska, where the Valdez-Eagle Trail crossed the Tanana River. He hired the steamer Lavelle Young to transport him and his supplies, and they began their trip upriver in August 1901. After turning into the Tanana from the Yukon, the steamboat ran into low water. After venturing upstream several miles, the boat reached an impassable point. Barnette suggested the Chena River (then called the Rock River) might be a slough of the Tanana and a way around the low water. About 15 miles (24 km) from the mouth of the Chena, the Lavelle Young again ran into an impassable stretch of river. The captain of the Young did not want to travel downstream with a heavy load because of the danger posed by the extra mass. He therefore unloaded Barnette's cargo on August 26, 1901, with an irate Barnette assisting.

Barnette began building a cabin at a site he named "Chenoa City", and he sold supplies to two prospectors, Felix Pedro and Tom Gilmore, who were in the area. Barnette traded for furs, then traveled to Valdez via dog team with his wife and three other men. The mountain pass they traveled through was later named Isabel Pass in honor of Barnette's wife. From Valdez, he returned to St. Michael, where he built a steamboat, the Isabelle, and began sailing up the Yukon in August 1902. He intended to move his supplies to Tanacross, but when he arrived at his trading post on the Chena River, he changed his mind. Felix Pedro had discovered gold.

== Origins of Fairbanks ==
Before Barnette traveled upriver with the Isabelle, he met Judge James Wickersham in St. Michael. Wickersham was the judge for the federal Third Judicial District, which stretched from the North Slope to the Aleutian Islands. Wickersham was impressed with Barnette and his plan to establish a trading post at Tanacross. He suggested Barnette name his settlement Fairbanks, after Charles W. Fairbanks, the senior Senator from Indiana. Barnette liked the idea and later said, "If we should ever want aid at the national capital, we would have the friendship, at least, of someone who could help us." When Barnette heard of Pedro's gold strike, he transferred the name for his planned Tanacross store to the settlement on the Chena River and convinced the people with him to accept the name.

When Barnette and the Isabelle's crew heard of Pedro's discovery, they immediately fled the boat and the settlement to stake claims on creeks and likely gold-bearing spots 12 miles (19 km) north, near the mountain and creek Pedro named after himself. Marking a claim was simple. Each man could pick a set amount of space, which was marked with posts at each corner, hence "staking" the claim. Each claim had to be listed by a federal recorder. When Barnette and the crew of the Isabelle were staking claims, Barnette proclaimed himself the interim recorder until an official one could be brought to the area. Although they also recorded their claims with Barnette, most men also reported their claims at the official office in Circle. To maximize his gain, Barnette had power of attorney for several relatives in Ohio. He staked claims in their names, thus giving him authority over a large portion of what was believed to be the gold-bearing terrain.

Word of Pedro's discovery spread during the months that followed Barnette's arrival in September 1902. In December, he wrote to a friend in Seattle, "A message came yesterday that 1,000 people had left Nome during the last three days for here. I look for half of Dawson here before spring." In January 1903, Barnette's cook, Jujiro Wada, arrived in Dawson City with word of the gold find. On January 17, 1903, the Yukon Sun newspaper ran the headline "RICH STRIKE MADE IN THE TANANA" across most of its front page, spurring miners from the Yukon to stampede to Fairbanks in the first big rush of the settlement's history.

== Boom ==
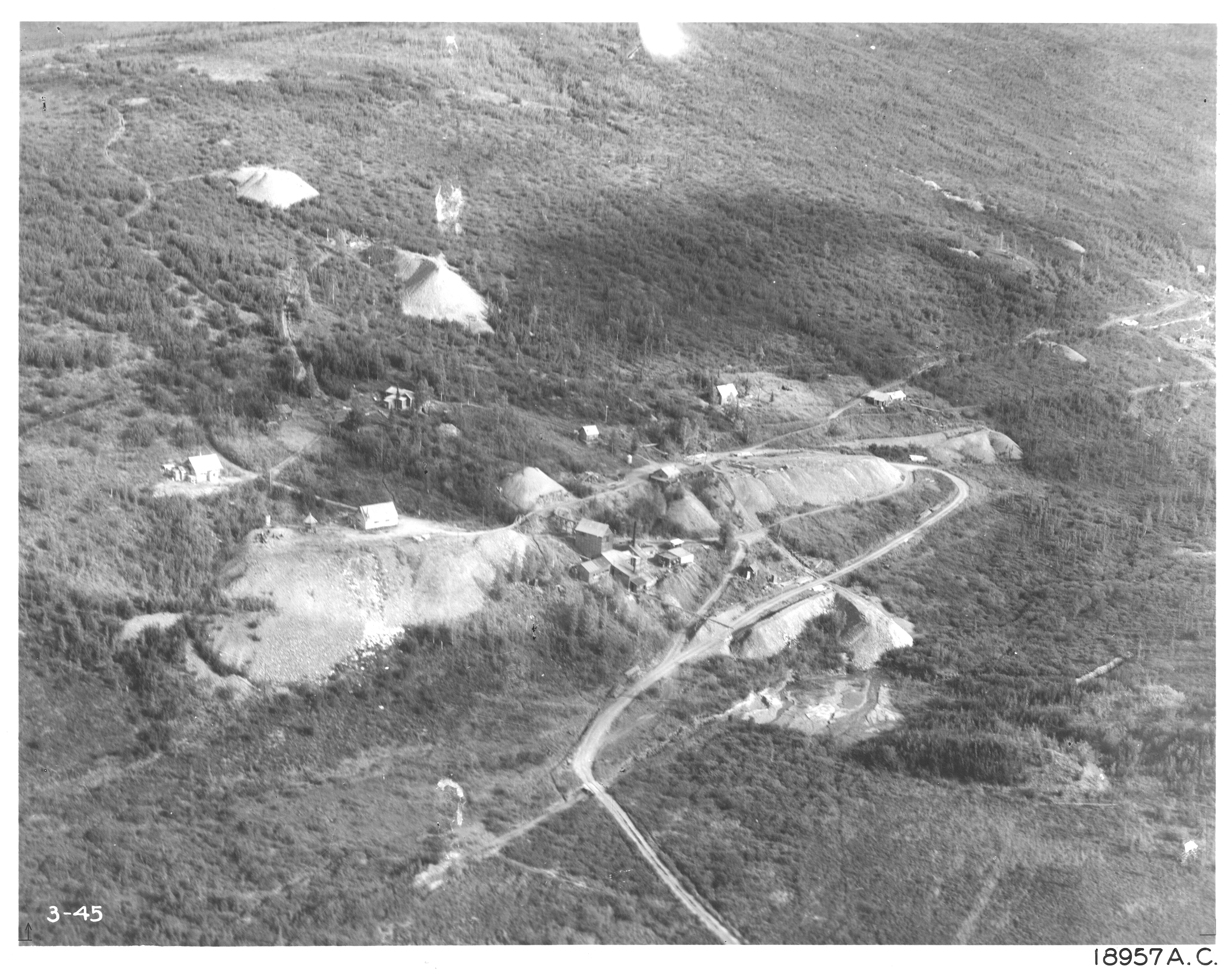
Mining in Fairbanks

When the miners from Nome, Dawson, Rampart, and other places arrived in the Tanana Valley, they were disappointed with what they found. Hundreds of claims were staked, but none were close to Pedro's discovery claims, which had been taken by the crew of the Isabelle and other early arrivers. Adding to the pressure on claiming land were men who, like Barnette, had power of attorney rights for others, and could thus make multiple claims. The Dawson Daily News reported that one man claimed 144 portions of 20 acres (81,000 m^{2}) apiece. Around Barnette's trading post, town lots were claimed for $2.50 apiece, and there was fierce competition for the choicest spots. At the mouth of the Chena River, a competing settlement, named Chena, sprang up when two traders moved their store to the junction of the two rivers. Land speculation was fierce in Chena, where claims were frequently stolen and had to be enforced with firearms.

Accounts vary, but historians estimate that by spring 1903, between 700 and 1,000 men arrived in the Tanana Valley. This put an enormous strain on Barnette's stock of food, which rapidly rose in price with demand. Miners objected to Barnette charging $12 per bag of flour and requiring them to buy cases of canned food. They gathered outside his store and demanded he lower his prices or they would burn it down. He responded that he had riflemen inside the building, and both groups reached a compromise. Shortly afterward, Barnette headed south with his wife on a dog team, intending to gather investors to purchase more supplies.

In April, Judge Wickersham arrived on a trip looking for a location for the courthouse, jail, and government offices for the Third District courts. He later described his first view of the settlement: "A half-dozen new squat log structures, a few tents ... a small clearing in the primitive forest—that was Fairbanks as I first saw it on April 9, 1903." Wickersham examined Chena as a potential site for the government offices, but he settled on Fairbanks, partially because Barnette's partner and brother-in-law, Frank Cleary, gave Wickersham a choice piece of land valued at between $1,500 and $2,000. Wickersham asked Cleary to name the two main streets in town Cushman and Lacey, after U.S. Representatives Francis W. Cushman of Washington and John F. Lacey of Iowa.

Wickersham estimated 500 people in town, and another count estimated 1,000, with 387 houses under construction, six saloons, and no churches. Before spring arrived, Wickersham published the first newspaper in the settlement—the Fairbanks Miner—on a typewriter. It sold seven copies at $5 per copy. But even as the walls of Wickersham's courthouse were going up, dissatisfied miners were leaving the area. Hundreds left on rafts going downriver or steamers going to Dawson City. By June 1903, cabins on city lots were selling for as little as $10. Meanwhile, Barnette sold two-thirds of his store to the Alaska Commercial Company and arranged for the establishment of a post office at his settlement.

In fall 1903, the flood of miners leaving the Tanana Valley ended when major gold strikes were made north of Fairbanks. The gold was deeper than in the Klondike, and it had taken time to dig to it. At Cleary Creek, miner Jesse Noble discovered what became the richest vein of gold in Alaska. Gold extraction was slow, because almost no heavy machinery was available to remove the overburden above the layers of gold. The gold discoveries of 1903 reversed the trend of people away from the Tanana Valley. By Christmas 1903, there were between 1,500 and 1,800 miners in the valley. Another food shortage arose during the winter of 1903, alleviated only by the food Barnette had brought in after his trip to the Lower 48.

Despite the food shortage, more buildings were constructed. The Northern Commercial Company built a store to replace Barnette's cabin, and Wickersham recorded a wide range of businesses, including 500 houses and 1,200 people. To manage the growing population, the settlement held a vote on November 10, 1903, to decide whether to incorporate Fairbanks as a town or not. The vote passed, and Barnette was sworn in as the city's first mayor on the next day.

== City of Fairbanks ==
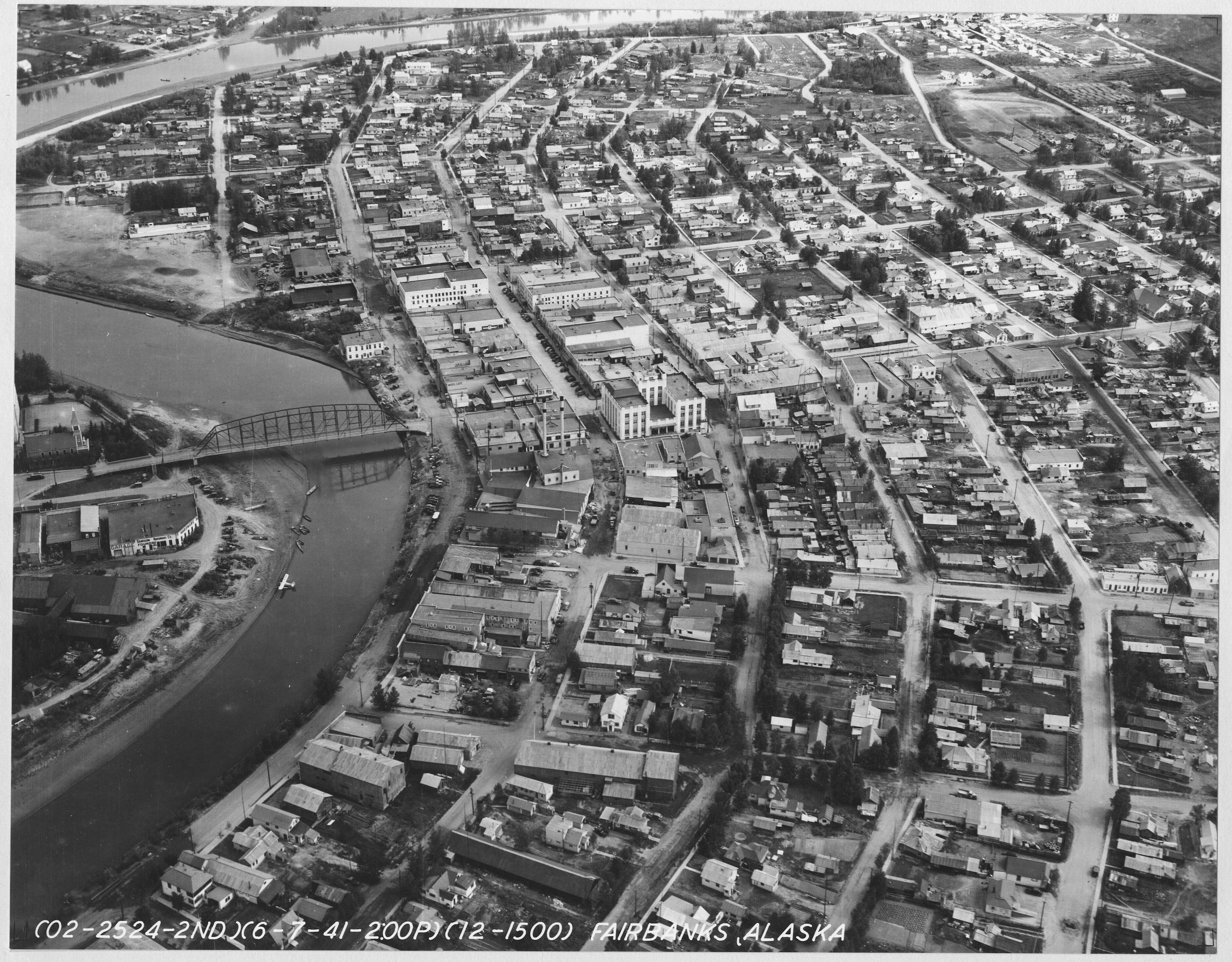
Downtown Fairbanks, 1940s

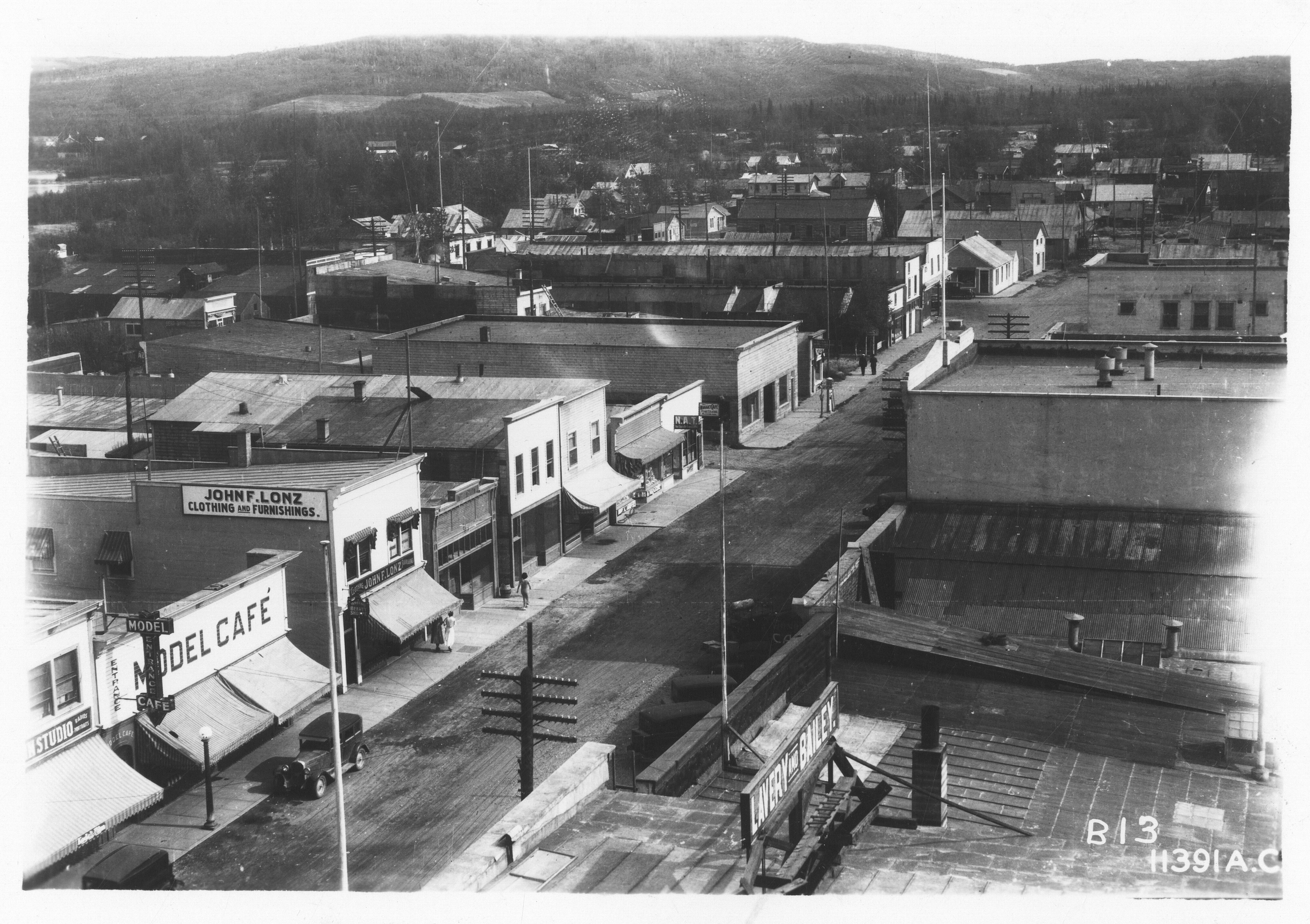
View of Fairbanks 1940s

Barnette's first action as mayor was to write a letter to Washington, D.C., asking the federal government to sell its military food stores from posts near the town, thus alleviating the food shortage. This move was followed by others: licensing a telephone company, providing for garbage collection, fire protection, and a one-room school (which shut down later that winter for lack of funds). Barnette used his position to grant long-term contracts for city utilities to members of his family. One of Barnette's brothers-in-law, James W. Hill, was given a 25-year contract to provide electricity, drinking water, and steam heat to the city. In 1904, Barnette arranged for regular shipments of supplies to Fairbanks, and the town continued to expand. In addition to the local telephone system, Fairbanks was connected to the outside world via the Washington-Alaska Military Cable and Telegraph System, which was expanded from Eagle to Nome in 1903 and passed through Fairbanks.

Gold production increased from $40,000 in 1903 to $600,000 in 1904 and $6 million in 1905. This expansion and the accompanying rise in population drove further productivity. Barnette opened the town's first bank on September 9, 1904. One month earlier, two Catholic priests built the town's first church, Immaculate Conception Church. Also in 1904, construction of a railroad began in Fairbanks and Chena, its downstream neighbor. Low water on the Chena River prevented steamboats from reaching Fairbanks, so a railroad line was built from the Tanana River at Chena to Fairbanks and the mines north of town. Construction of the Tanana Mines Railroad (later the Tanana Valley Railroad) was finished to Fairbanks on July 17, 1905. Two new banks opened in 1905, as did the city's first greenhouse, and a new $10,000 bridge across the Chena River. In June 1905, the bridge caused the biggest flood in the young city's history when a bridge upstream of it collapsed and the resulting wreckage caught in the bridge and blocked the river's flow. The river rose, flooding the town, and the bridge had to be dynamited to halt the flood. The next year, a fire destroyed most of Fairbanks, and the damage was estimated at $1.5 million. The town was quickly rebuilt, and the town's first hospital, St. Joseph's, was built on the north bank of the Chena. Because the hospital was run by a Catholic religious order, Immaculate Conception Church was later transported across the Chena River and placed next to the hospital. In 1907, Barnette's bank was forced to temporarily close due to the Panic of 1907 and legal troubles. A new school was built, which housed 150 students. Other schools were built on the north side of the Chena River, which was separate from town.

In 1908, the U.S. Army Signal Corps built a radiotelegraph tower in town, replacing the cable telegraph system to Valdez and Seattle. The 176 feet (54 m) tower was the tallest structure in town for decades. In 1909, Fairbanks' gold production peaked at more than $9.5 million. The town saw its first library open that year, and the Fairbanks Daily News-Miner, the city's longest-lived newspaper, began publishing.

Poor investments caused the bank founded by Barnette to fail in January 1911, at a time when it held more than $1 million in deposits from Fairbanks residents. In Fairbanks, the common belief was that Barnette had embezzled money from the bank. Although he was found guilty of only one of 11 charges against him, Barnette had a poor reputation in Fairbanks. For years afterward, Fairbanks newspapers referred to any robbery as "Barnetting" the subject.

The accusations against Barnette were big news in a town that had little crime. Gambling and drinking were common throughout the town. Prostitution was restricted to a district separated from the rest of town by a wooden fence. The "line," as it was known, operated until the 1950s with the tacit approval of city authorities. Fights were common, but gunplay was not. As one miner recalled, not more than one man in 500 carried a gun, and while fisticuffs were common, gunfights were not. This was backed up by the experience of Northern Commercial Company stagecoach drivers, who carried more than $7 million overland during a 12-year period without a single incident.

== Decline ==
In 1911, the Fairbanks Commercial Club, a group of businesses, created the slogan "Fairbanks, Alaska's Golden Heart." The slogan remains the city's motto today. In that year, Fairbanks boasted a population of more than 3,500 people, making it the largest city in Alaska. Thousands more people lived in mining camps outside the city itself. But 1910 marked the beginning of a decline in Fairbanks' fortunes. That year, less than $6 million in gold was produced—two-thirds the total of the previous year. By 1911, production was half what it had been in 1909. In 1918, it was ten percent of what it had been nine years before. The decline in production caused businesses to go out of business. Stores that sold to miners closed, as did those that supported the mines directly. World War I caused a further decline as the town's young men were drafted and sent overseas. Economic effects also were felt. A local judge later stated that the war "set Fairbanks back by 10 years" because it dried up construction and sent men overseas. After the war, the 1918 flu pandemic was particularly virulent in Alaska; it killed between 2,000 and 3,000 people in the territory. By 1923, the Fairbanks Daily News-Miner estimated fewer than 1,000 people lived in the city, and almost none at the mining camps beyond town.

== Slowing the decline ==
Although Fairbanks was in decline, two major projects mitigated the worst effects of the post-gold rush slump: construction of the Alaska Railroad and the creation of the University of Alaska.

=== Alaska Railroad ===
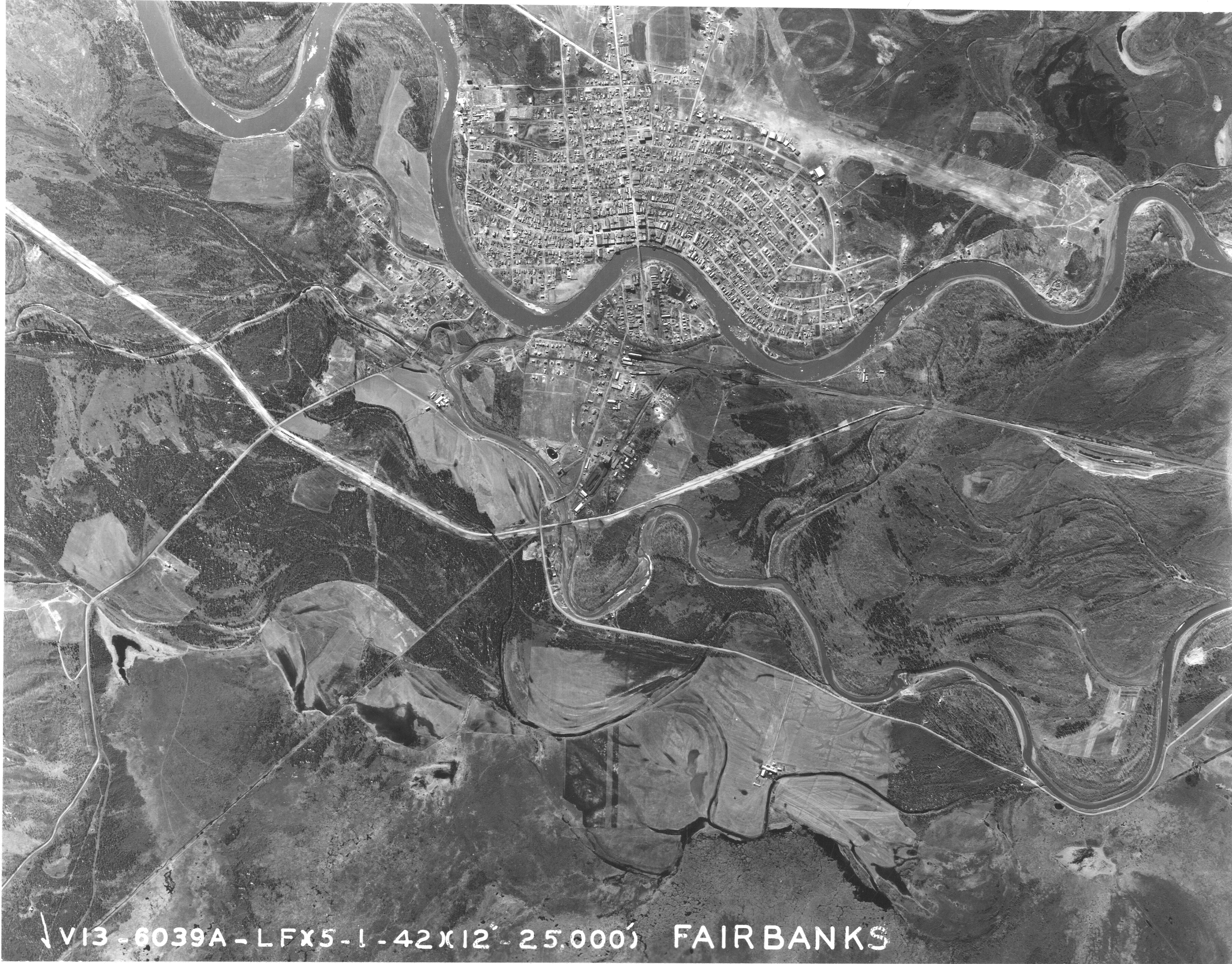
Aerial photo of Fairbanks in the 1940s, recent construction of the Alaska railroad is clearly visible

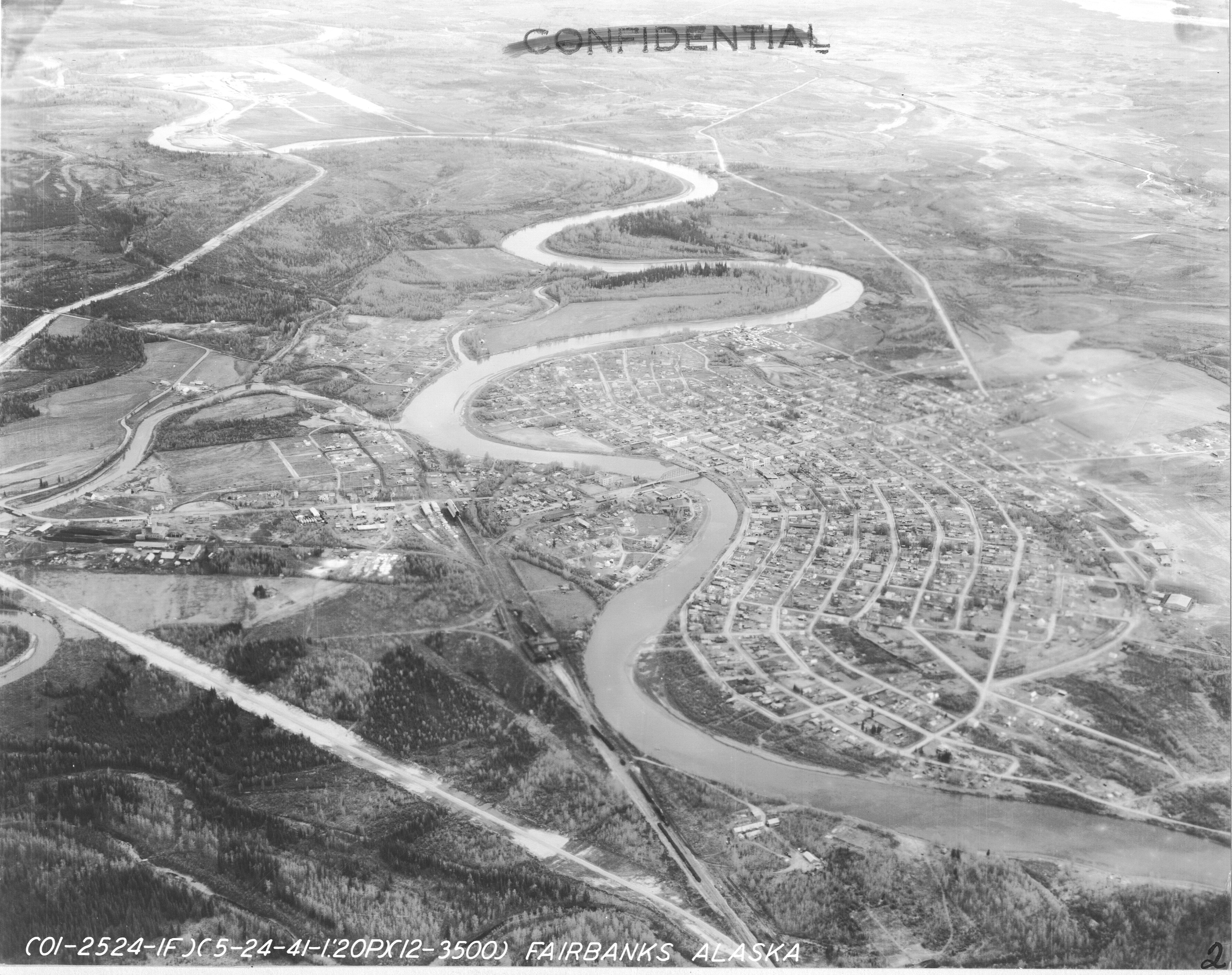

In 1906, L.A. Nadeau of the Northern Pacific Railroad predicted a railroad link to the ocean would allow gold miners to bring in heavy equipment and process large amounts of low-grade ore. "Not only will the cost of living be cheaper to the miner, but he will be able to get his heavy machinery at a price low enough to enable him to work a vast quantity of low-grade ground, which cannot be touched under present conditions." Eight years after that remark, the U.S. Congress appropriated $35 million to build the Alaska Railroad system. News of the appropriation set off celebrations among Fairbanks residents who hoped its construction would prove a boon for the local economy.

In 1917, the Alaska Railroad purchased the Tanana Valley Railroad, which had suffered from the wartime economic problems. The railroad line was extended westward, until it reached the town of Nenana and a construction party working north from Ship Creek, later renamed Anchorage. Until the railroad was finished and coal from Healy became available, Fairbanks burned wood as a heating source and to provide electricity. In 1913, the town burned between 12,000 and 14,000 cords of wood, with the Northern Commercial Company (owners of the power plant) burning 8,500 cords alone.

President Warren G. Harding visited Fairbanks in 1923 as part of a trip to hammer in the ceremonial final spike of the railroad at Nenana. The rail yards of the Tanana Valley Railroad were converted for use by the Alaska Railroad, and Fairbanks became the northern end of the line and its second-largest depot.

=== University of Alaska ===
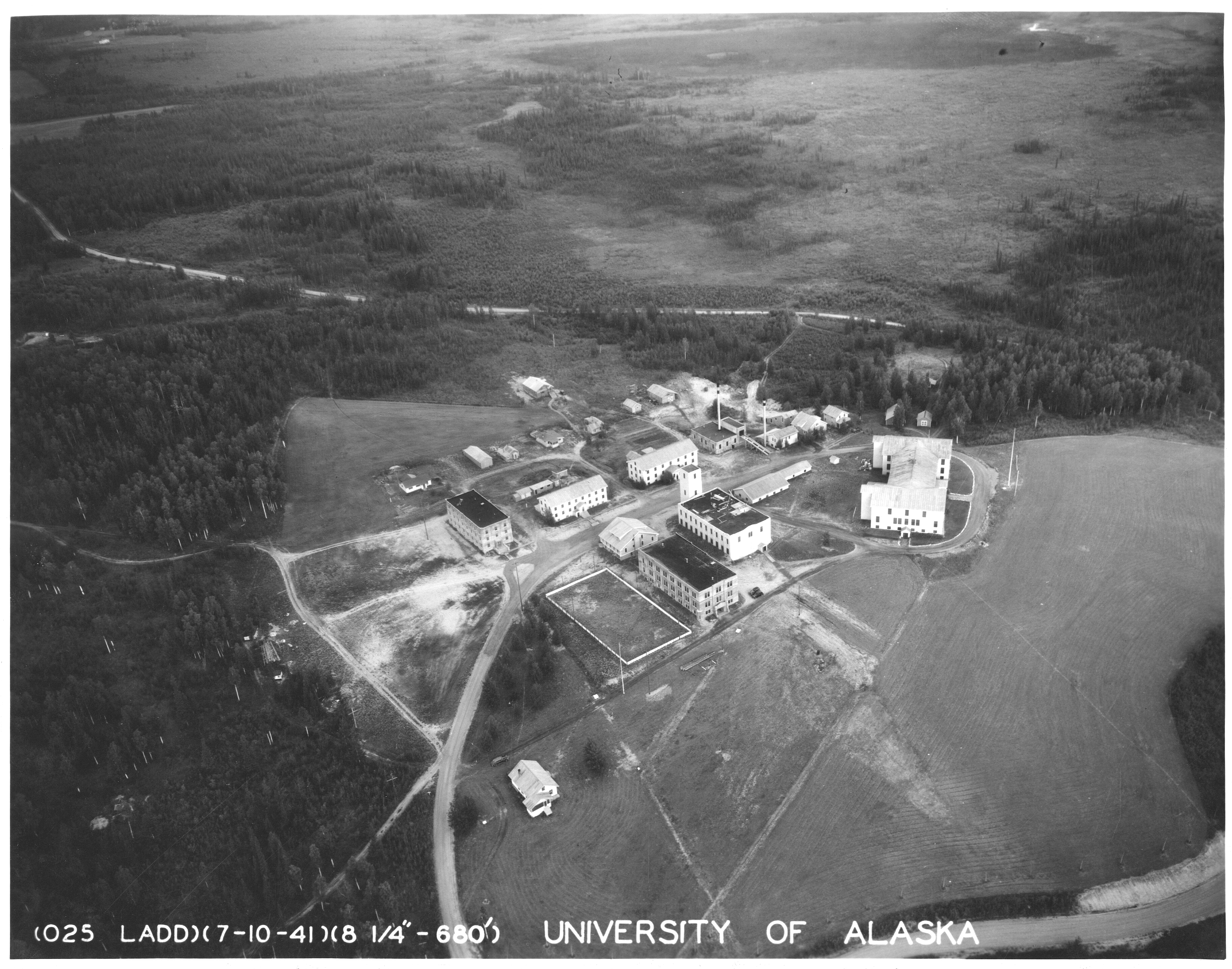
University of Alaska, 1940s

One year before Harding's visit to Fairbanks, the Alaska Agricultural College and School of Mines (today known as the University of Alaska Fairbanks), opened its doors to six students. The school was thought up by James Wickersham, who had risen to become Alaska's delegate to Congress. In 1915, Wickersham gained approval of a bill funding the college from the 63rd United States Congress. After the bill was approved, he traveled to Fairbanks and selected a site on a hill four miles west of Fairbanks, in what is today College, Alaska now often referred to as part of Fairbanks, and not as a separate entity. On July 4, 1915, acting "without the authority of law," he laid the cornerstone for the school.

The site for the school was directly north of the U.S. Agricultural Experimental Station (Tanana Valley), an experimental farm created by Charles Christian Georgeson in 1907. The farm was a project by the U.S. Department of Agriculture to explore the agricultural potential of Interior Alaska. By 1916, one year after the founding of the University of Alaska, the experimental farm employed 20 people. As mining declined in the Fairbanks area, some miners turned to homesteading. Under the Homestead Act, many miners applied for grants of land from the federal government and established farms around the city. A 1919 survey by the U.S. Geological Survey identified 94 homesteads within six miles of Fairbanks. Also listed were two tungsten mills and 16 gold mills.

Agriculture in the area was spurred by food and fodder shortages during the winters of 1913, 1915, and 1916. Fairbanks businessmen also encouraged the growth of farming. Wickersham provided more funding for the experimental farm, the Tanana Valley Railroad provided free grain seed acquired from an experimental farm in Sweden, and William Fentress Thompson, the editor of the Fairbanks Daily News-Miner, wrote frequent editorials supporting more farming. Prominent Fairbanks businessmen formed the Alaska Loyal League, a group that encouraged farming. Farmers also created the Tanana Valley State Fair in 1924 to demonstrate their agricultural success. It is Alaska's oldest state fair and still operates today. Despite these moves, the agriculture movement in Fairbanks had only limited success. A farmers' bank established in 1917 to provide loans for equipment purchases went out of business two years later, and although the Alaska Railroad allowed for cheaper shipment of tractors and other agricultural equipment, it also permitted a steady supply of food shipments to Fairbanks. In 1929, Alaska farms met only about 10 percent of the state's food demand. By 1931, the University of Alaska had grown to the point that the experimental farm was annexed by the school.

== Dredging era ==
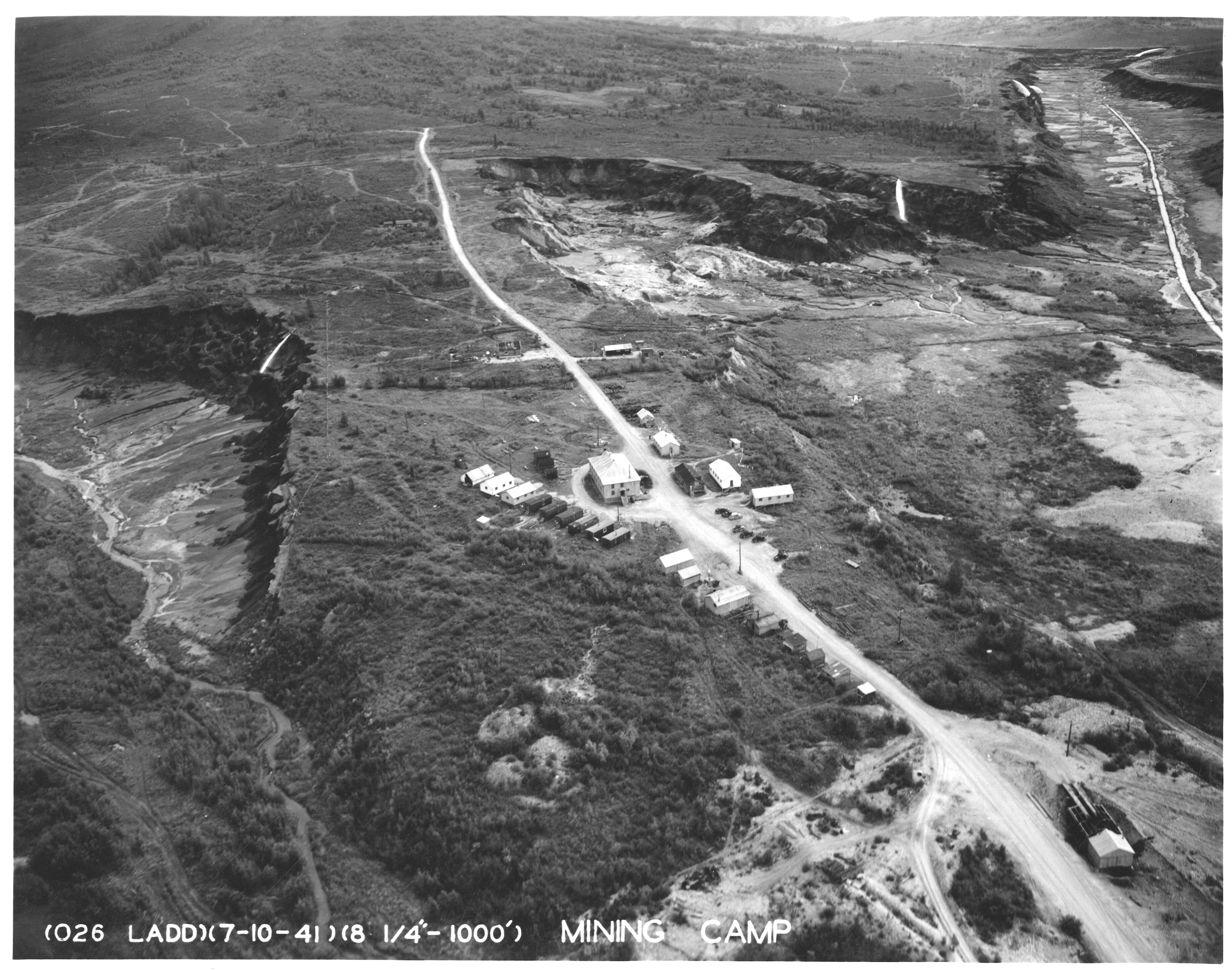
Mining camp in Fairbanks, 1940s

After the completion of the Alaska Railroad, it became economically feasible to bring in heavy equipment and build gold dredges to work the large amount of low-grade ore that remained after the Fairbanks Gold Rush. The best example of this is the construction of Davidson Ditch, a 90-mile (140 km) aqueduct built between 1924 and 1929 to provide water for gold dredging. Fairbanks Exploration Company (FE Co.), a division of the United States Smelting, Refining and Mining Company, built both the aqueduct and many of the dredges that used its water to process ore. Large-scale dredging began in 1928, and FE Co. became the town's biggest employer. It built the biggest power plant in Alaska to provide electricity for the dredges, and it built pumping stations to provide them with water from the Chena and other rivers.

In 1933, President Franklin Delano Roosevelt fixed the price of gold at $35 per ounce. This price increase encouraged mining and insulated Fairbanks from the Great Depression. When Roosevelt called for a bank holiday to alleviate the worst effects of the depression, Fairbanks banks declined, saying they didn't need one. Large-scale dredging peaked in 1940, when 209,000 ounces of gold were produced in the Fairbanks area. After the outbreak of World War II in the United States, the federal government closed most gold-mining operations, deeming them unessential to the war effort.

In 1932, Fairbanks' two-story school, built in 1907, burned to the ground. A new, $150,000 three-story concrete art deco building was proposed as a replacement, and after heated debate, a $100,000 bond measure was approved in 1933. On January 22, 1934, the new school opened. It had space for about 500 students, but the town's growth required renovation and expansion in 1939 and 1948.

=== Paving Fairbanks ===
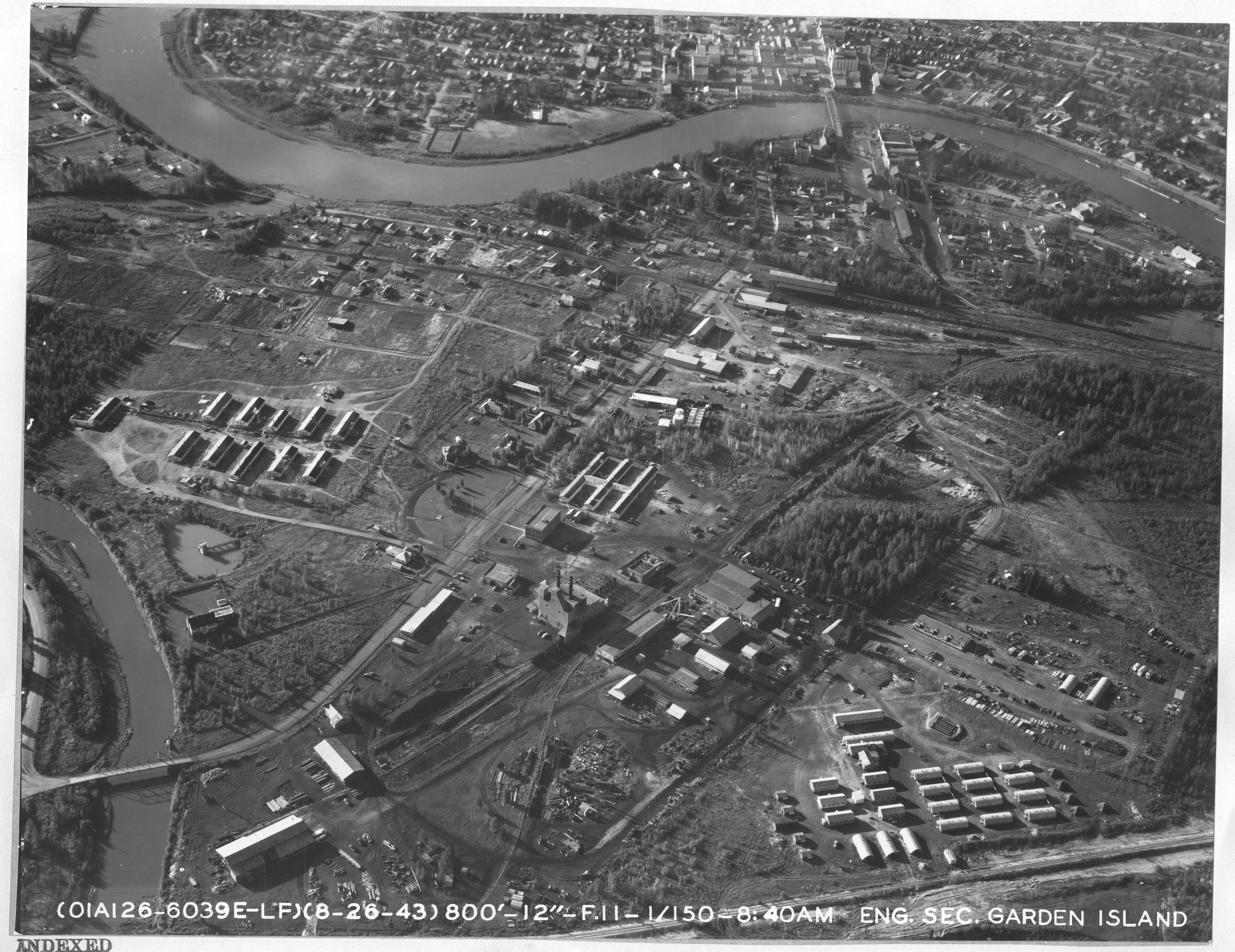
Industry in Fairbanks

Until 1938, Fairbanks lacked paved streets. The town's dirt roads turned to dust in summer and thick mud in spring and fall, causing problems as Fairbanks' population grew in the 1930s. In 1937, the mayor of Fairbanks, E. B. Collins, proposed using a federal grant and city bonds to pave the roads, but he was turned down by voters. The next year, he tried again and was successful. By 1940, the first 0.25 miles (0.40 km) of paved road was complete.

=== Aviation ===
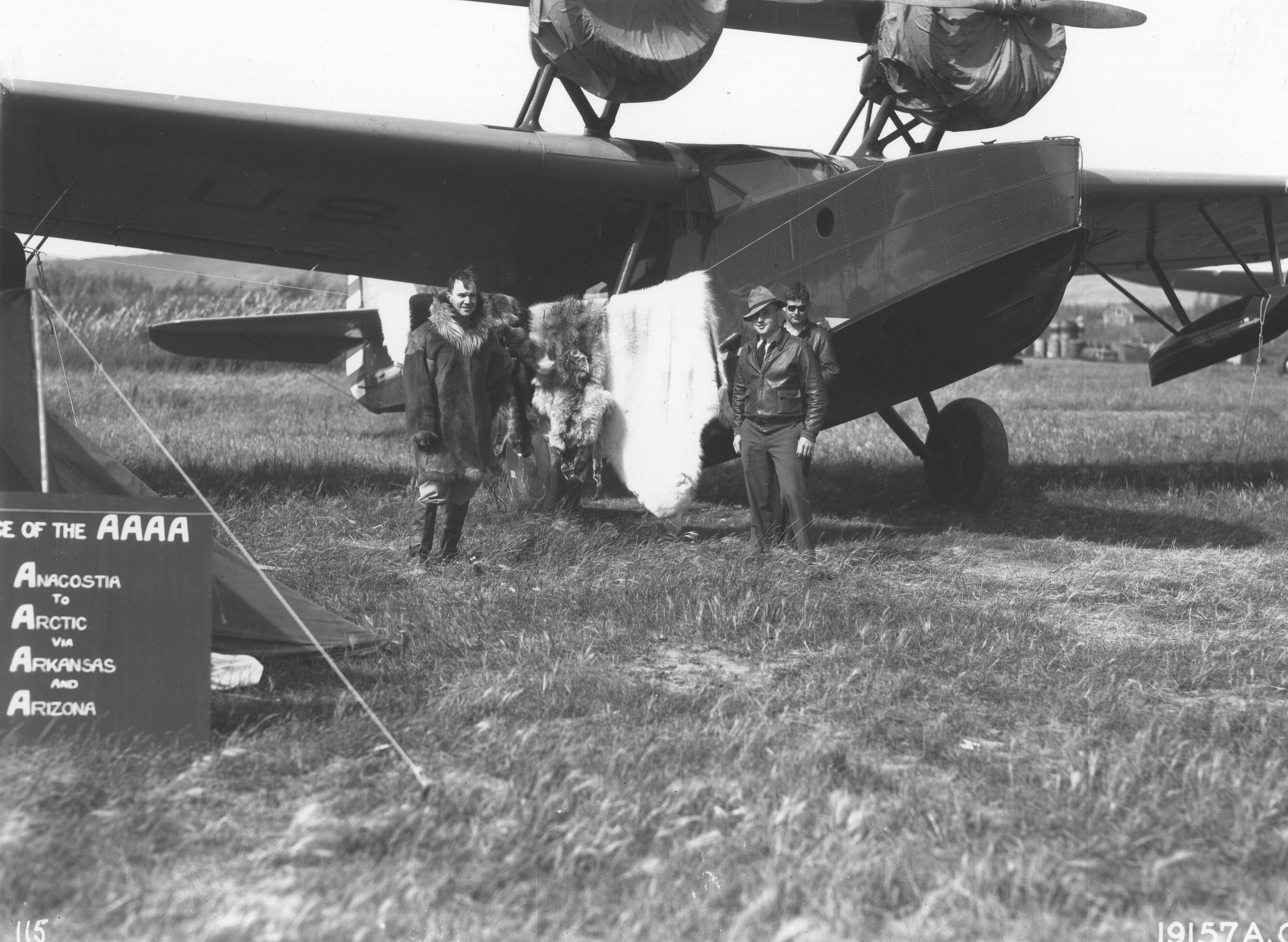
Aviation in Fairbanks

About the time of the completion of the Alaska Railroad and the beginning of the dredging era in Fairbanks, Alaska's aviation industry began to take off. The first airplane flight in Alaska took place in Fairbanks on July 4, 1913, when a barnstormer flew from a field south of town. The aircraft had been crated and sent from Seattle via Skagway and Whitehorse. The pilot subsequently tried to sell the aircraft, but had no takers. Alaska's first commercial aircraft didn't arrive until June 1923, when Noel Wien began flying a Curtiss JN-4 on mail routes between Fairbanks and isolated communities. From Fairbanks, Wien became the first person to fly to Anchorage and cross the Arctic Circle in an airplane.

Given Alaska's limited road and rail infrastructure, the territorial government saw the advantages of aerial transport. In 1925, the territorial legislature authorized the spending of up to $40,000 per year on airfield construction. Between that year and 1927, more than 20 airfields were built. By 1930, Alaska had more than 100. In Fairbanks, airplanes flew from a field that doubled as a baseball diamond until 1931, when the city bought the field, installed infrastructure, and named it Weeks Field. By the late 1930s, there were more than four dozen airplanes in the town of about 3,000 people, giving Fairbanks the reputation of having the most airplanes per capita in the world. Because of Fairbanks' location halfway between New York City and Tokyo, it became a crucial stop on the first around-the-world flights. Wiley Post's 1933 solo circumnavigation stopped in Fairbanks, as did Howard Hughes' 1938 effort.

Military flights also used Fairbanks as a base. In 1920, the first flight from the contiguous United States to Alaska used Fairbanks as a base. In 1934, a flight of Martin B-10 bombers flew from Washington, D.C. to Fairbanks, ostensibly to demonstrate the feasibility of long-range bomber deployments. In reality, the bombers flew photographic missions intended to scout locations for military airfields to be built in the territory.

== Military era ==
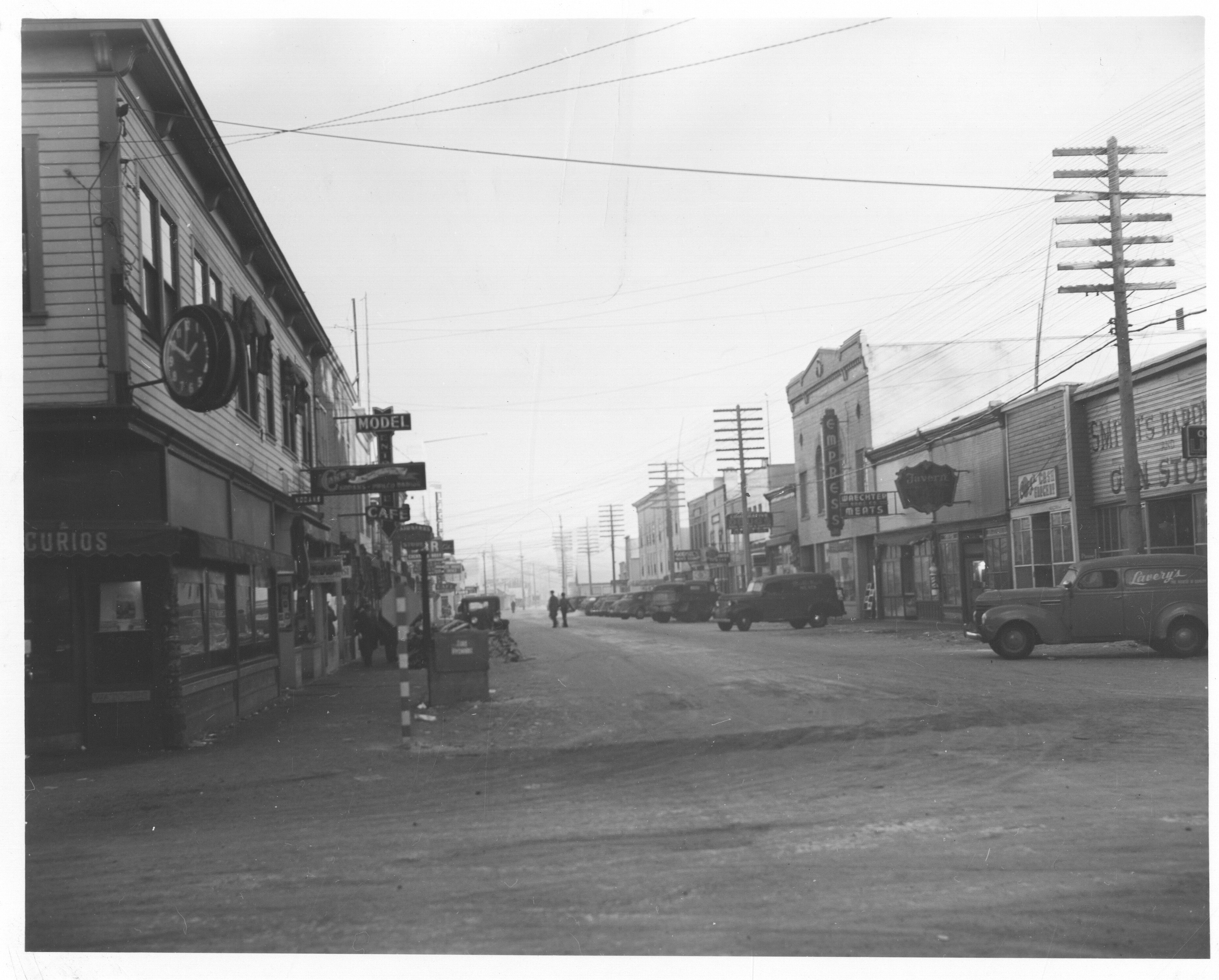
1940s view of Second Avenue looking east from Cushman Street.

In his final public appearance, U.S. Army General Billy Mitchell said, "I believe that, in the future, whoever holds Alaska will hold the world... I think it is the most important strategic place in the world." That year, Congress passed the Wilcox National Air Defense Act, which provided for a new airbase in Alaska for cold-weather testing and training. A survey team visited Fairbanks in 1936, and in 1937, President Franklin Delano Roosevelt issued Executive Order 7596, which set aside 6 square miles (16 km^{2}) of public land east of Fairbanks for the new airbase, which was named Ladd Army Airfield after Army pilot Arthur Ladd. Preliminary construction began in summer 1939, a few days before Germany invaded Poland to start World War II. The first runway was finished in September 1940, and the base was dedicated then, before most of the buildings were complete.

In the first winter after the dedication, soldiers practiced flying and servicing aircraft in subzero weather conditions. More than 1,000 workers, most of whom were hired from outside Alaska, worked on the project through 1941. Despite these outside workers, the construction effort caused unemployment to almost vanish in Fairbanks, causing a large demand for labor. Fairbanks' economy grew, and the city's second radio station, KFAR, began broadcasting on October 1, 1939. Hangars and base buildings were completed in summer 1941, but the second winter of cold-weather testing was interrupted by the Japanese attack on Pearl Harbor.

=== World War II ===
Fairbanks received word of the attack on Pearl Harbor via civilian shortwave radio operators who passed the news to the U.S. Army base. More than 200 civil defense volunteers immediately signed up for work that included orchestrating a town blackout, blocking town airfields, and making emergency plans to evacuate the town if attacked. In June 1942, the invasion of the Aleutian Islands and the bombing of Dutch Harbor intensified the war's effect on Fairbanks. Ladd Field's cold-weather testing detachment was disbanded as its soldiers were used to bolster Alaska defenses at other locations.

During summer 1942, more soldiers arrived in Fairbanks to replace those moved away from town. Fairbanks residents were drafted to work at Ladd Field because the U.S. Army believed Alaskans were best experienced in cold-weather work. After gold mining was suspended during the war, the Army leased FE Co. offices and requisitioned supplies from Fairbanks businesses. Wartime demand and the draft caused a severe labor shortage in Fairbanks, and supplies of various food and commercial products were interrupted beyond the wartime rationing in the rest of the country. Crime also increased, and because the U.S. Army was placed in wartime control of the Alaska Territory, all newspapers and letters to and from Fairbanks were censored.

To alleviate shortages and supply the war effort, the U.S. Army and the Canadian government began construction of the Alaska Highway, which connected the Canadian road network to Alaska's Richardson Highway and Fairbanks. The highway was completed in fall 1942 and regular traffic began in 1943. As work on the highway took place, war supplies were already reaching Fairbanks through the air. The Northwest Staging Route, a chain of airfields, ended at Fairbanks. Starting in February 1942, supply aircraft began landing in Fairbanks to supply the war effort in Alaska. In summer 1942, negotiations between the United States and the Soviet Union resulted in an extension of the Lend-Lease effort to Russia. Using the Northwest Staging Route, aircraft were flown from Great Falls, Montana, to Ladd Field. At Ladd Field, the aircraft were turned over to Soviet pilots, who flew them to Nome and on to the Soviet Union. Fairbanks was chosen as a transfer location because it was more protected from potential Japanese attack than Nome.

Starting in fall 1942, large numbers of Soviet soldiers arrived in Fairbanks to work with the U.S. soldiers already in the town. The massive Lend-Lease effort required additional facilities to be built in and near Fairbanks. Ladd Field expanded, and the grounds of the U.S. Army post expanded until it met the city limits of Fairbanks. The University of Alaska, which saw most of its students taken up by the draft, provided office and dormitory space for U.S. and Soviet soldiers. Its professors also contributed to the war effort with specially created Russian language classes. Russian airmen were regular customers of Fairbanks stores, and they bought large amounts of consumer goods unavailable at home. To meet demand when Ladd Field was unusable due to fog, an airfield now known as Eielson Air Force Base was built southeast of Fairbanks. Although there were some conflicts between Soviet and U.S. soldiers and civilians, Lend-Lease operations in Fairbanks continued through the end of the war, and when Lend-Lease ended in September 1945, 7,926 aircraft and tons of cargo had been transferred to Soviet officials in Fairbanks.

=== Cold War ===
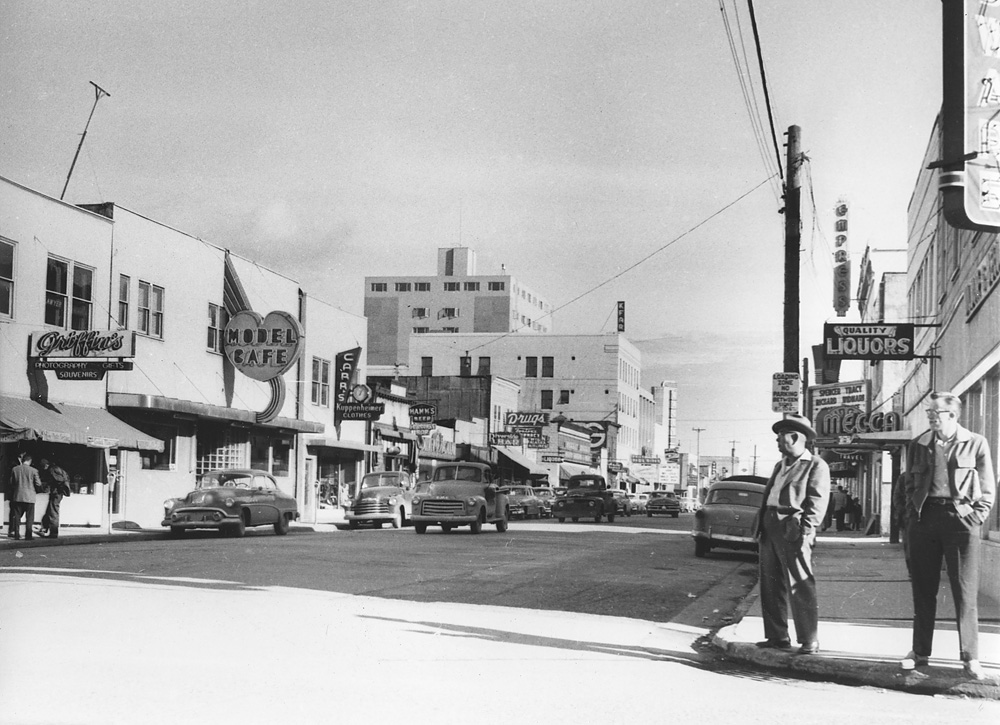
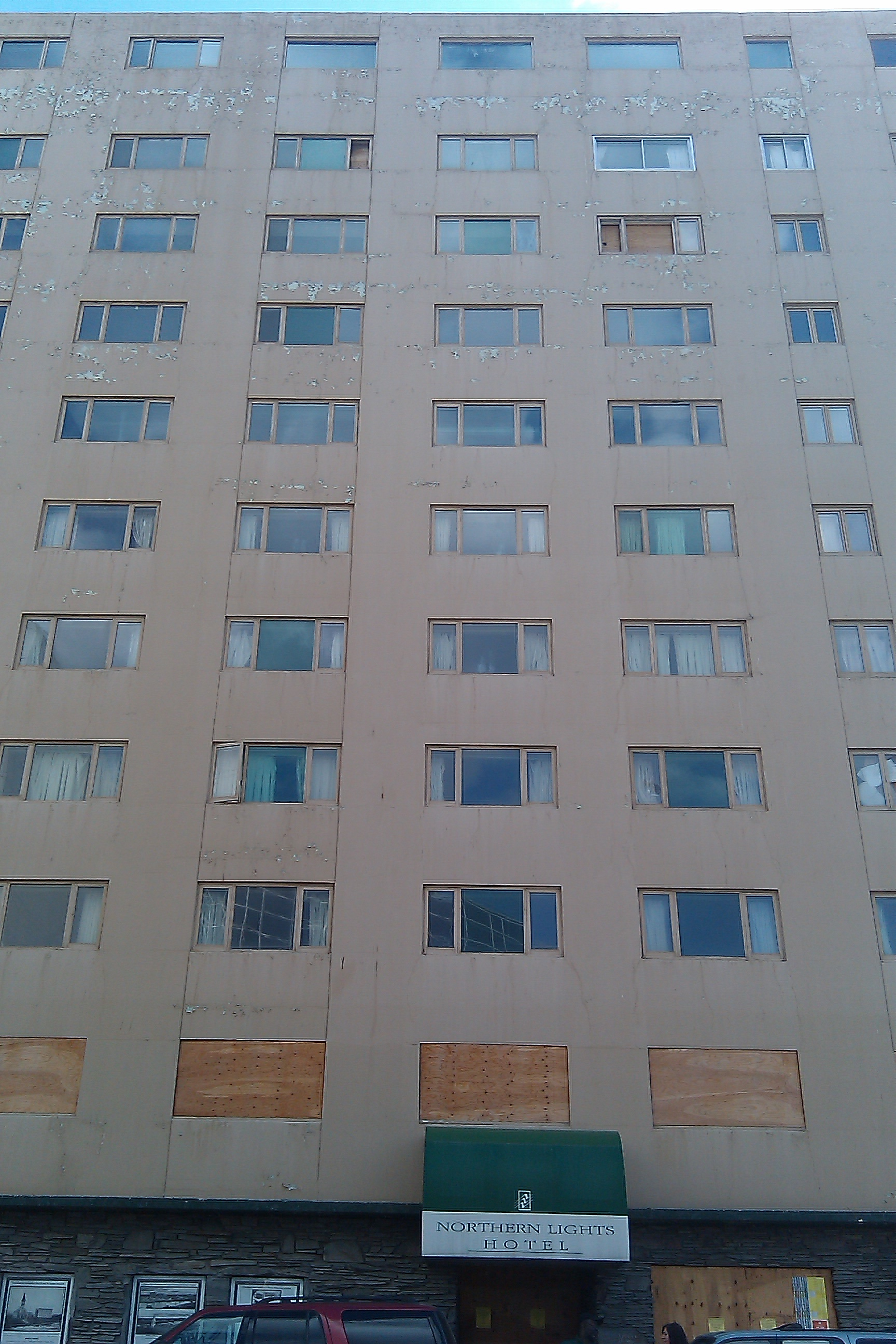
Left: Looking easterly down Second Avenue from Cushman Street in 1955. In the background is the Polaris Building, the tallest building in Fairbanks since its completion in 1952. Right: The Polaris Building in May 2011, over a decade after being abandoned. The awning of its last occupant, the defunct Anchorage-based Northern Lights Hotel chain, is still visible.

By fall 1945, Ladd Field had grown to encompass almost 5,000 military personnel and acres of runways and buildings. Despite a brief lull as the U.S. Army demobilized after World War II, activity in Fairbanks remained high as the Cold War began. The population of the Fairbanks area grew by 240 percent between 1940 and 1950, then doubled between 1950 and 1953. This growth strained the city's infrastructure: schools, water, power, sewer, and telephone systems were all overstressed by new arrivals and expansion. Suburbs sprang up around Fairbanks, which began annexing them in turn. In 1952, the city's boundaries grew from 1.3 square miles (3.4 km^{2}) to 2.4 square miles (6.2 km^{2}), with another 1 square mile (2.6 km^{2}) soon after. More than a dozen subdivisions and housing developments filled the area between Fairbanks city limits and College, and the city's border advanced westward until it met the college city limit. The burgeoning town stopped to commemorate its roots with the Golden Days Festival, a weeklong celebration of Fairbanks history that started to mark the 50th anniversary of the discovery of gold. The annual festival continues today.

The University of Alaska also grew during this period. In 1946, Congress appropriated money to build a Geophysical Institute to study Arctic phenomena such as the aurora borealis. The institute was established in 1949 and spurred the university's growth as the GI Bill simultaneously boosted the student population. Elementary education also developed as the Fairbanks Independent School District (the precursor to today's Fairbanks North Star Borough School District) was established in 1947 to collect school taxes from areas outside the city limits that were sending students to Fairbanks' school. The Golden Valley Electric Association, an electrical cooperative, was founded in the 1940s to provide electricity to areas outside Fairbanks city limits. In 1953, it bought the FE Co. power plant that served Fairbanks and provided electricity to customers as varied as Fairbanks' second radio station, KFRB, and the town's largest farm, Creamer's Dairy.

A new airport opened on Oct. 15, 1951, to replace Weeks Field, which had been encroached upon by the town's growth, including Denali Elementary School, the town's first new school since the 1930s. The new Fairbanks International Airport began serving DC-6s, which cut the travel time from Seattle to six hours from eight. The new airport also attracted an over-the-pole test flight by Scandinavian Airlines System, but the airline eventually chose Anchorage as a refueling point for flights from Stockholm to Tokyo. Ground transportation also improved in Fairbanks, as a major program to pave downtown roads began in 1953 with the goal of coating 30 blocks. New military facilities sprang up around Fairbanks and further away. The Haines - Fairbanks 626 mile long 8" petroleum products pipeline was constructed during the period 1953–55. The city was a staging area for the construction of the Distant Early Warning Line, the Ballistic Missile Early Warning System at Clear Air Station, and several Nike Hercules air defense missile batteries.

The first skyscrapers were built in Fairbanks during this period: the eight-story Northward Building and the 100-foot (30 m) Hill Building (later Polaris Building) were built in the first half of the 1950s. The first traffic lights were installed during the same period. Fairbanks' first television station, KTVF Channel 11, began broadcasting on February 17, 1955. The city's first dedicated high school, Lathrop High (originally Fairbanks High), also began operating in 1955. In the four years that followed, four new elementary schools opened, taking the burden off Main School, which became Main Junior High School.

== Statehood ==
The Chair would like to announce that the temperature is now about forty below and if the delegates have their cars out there, they probably should start them in order that they will start.

— William A. Egan, Alaska Constitutional Convention President

During the 1950s, agitation grew in Alaska for the territory to become a state. Alaskans could not vote in presidential elections and had a territorial legislature with limited powers. Efforts to lobby federal legislators for an Alaska statehood bill met with limited success, so prominent territorial officials decided to draft a state constitution to prove Alaska's readiness to become a state. On November 8, 1955, 55 elected delegates gathered at the University of Alaska to begin drafting a state constitution. The resulting debates lasted more than two months and caused a sensation in Fairbanks. Debates of the constitutional convention were broadcast on Fairbanks radio, and the Fairbanks Daily News-Miner dedicated daily reports to the progress of the convention. On February 5, 1956, the delegates signed the constitution before 1,000 people who crowded into the University of Alaska gymnasium. The building where deliberations took place was subsequently named Constitution Hall.

On June 30, 1958, the U.S. Senate voted 64–20 to accept Alaska as a state. The news set off massive celebrations in Fairbanks. Residents set off fireworks, an impromptu parade took place down Cushman Street, the city's main road, and an attempt to dye the Chena River gold in celebration instead turned it green. The celebration was capped when residents used weather balloons to lift a 30-foot (9.1 m) wide wooden star painted gold and emblazoned with "49" into the air. The balloons lifted it, then drifted into power lines, causing a 16-minute power outage across the city.

President Dwight Eisenhower officially signed the new state into the United States on January 3, 1959, putting the Alaska constitution into effect. The new state's constitution called for the creation of borough governments to help manage the new state. Fairbanks and other areas were reluctant to impose an additional layer of government on themselves, and balked. In 1963, the Alaska Legislature passed the Mandatory Borough Act, which required the eight most populous areas of the state to form organized boroughs by 1964. Students from Fairbanks schools chose "North Star" as the Fairbanks' borough's name, and the Fairbanks North Star Borough came into existence on January 1, 1964.

The years after statehood saw the military boom continue to boost the Fairbanks economy and growth of the city. Fairbanks International Airport's runway was lengthened to 11,500 feet to accommodate jet aircraft. The George Parks Highway was built from Fairbanks to Anchorage and Denali National Park, encouraging tourism. Homes were built on the hills to the north of Fairbanks for the first time, roads were repaved and smoothed, and sidewalks replaced dirt paths. The growth had a price, however. Many of the structures built during Fairbanks' founding were torn down in the name of urban renewal. The first home built in Fairbanks was demolished, as were the final homes remaining on "the line", Fairbanks' prostitution district.

In 1960, the U.S. Air Force made plans to close Ladd Airfield and transfer its functions to nearby Eielson Air Force Base and Elmendorf Air Force Base near Anchorage. When the decision was publicly announced, it was met with almost unanimous opposition by Fairbanks residents and businesses in the area. Although the Air Force held firm in its decision to transfer out of the base, the U.S. Army took over the post on January 1, 1961, and renamed it Fort Wainwright.

The arts scene in Fairbanks also grew during this time. The Fairbanks Symphony Orchestra was founded in 1959, and the Fairbanks Drama Association was created in 1963. The Alaska Goldpanners baseball team was founded in 1959 as the city's first professional sports team. The next year, the Goldpanners hosted their first annual Midnight Sun Baseball Game, a tradition that had been conducted since 1905 and continues under the Goldpanners' auspices today. Through the 1960s, Fairbanks became much more like small towns in the Lower 48 as communications, transportation, and utilities improved.

== The Great Flood ==
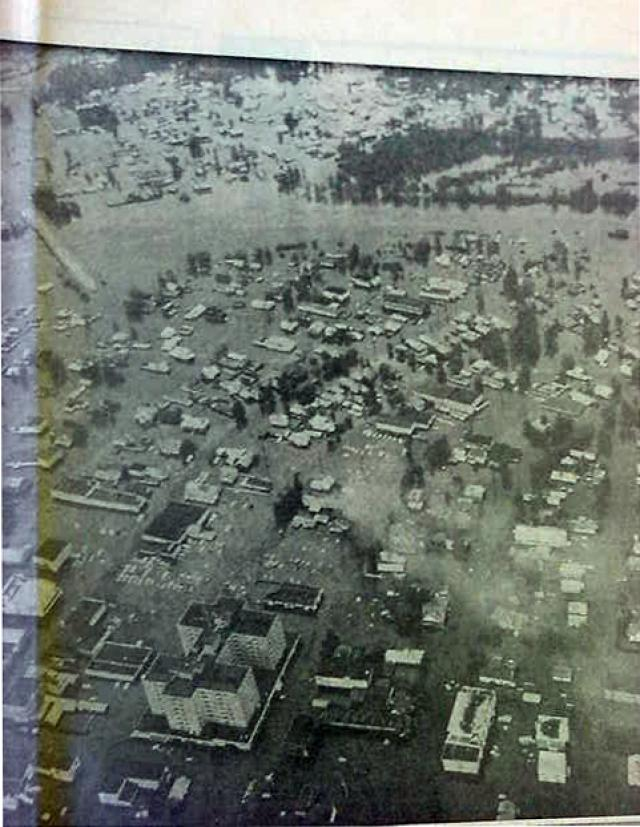
Aerial photo, looking roughly eastward, as downtown Fairbanks is inundated by floodwaters, 1967. The Northward Building is at lower left. The Wendell Street Bridge is at upper left. The (by now submerged) Chena River runs across the top half of the photo, with Graehl and Bentley Island (Island Homes) to the north and east (or in the photo, above) the river.

In 1967, Alaska celebrated 100 years since its purchase by the United States from Russia. To celebrate the event, Fairbanksans built A-67 (later Alaskaland and today Pioneer Park), a theme park celebrating the history of Fairbanks and Alaska. At a site away from downtown Fairbanks, it features pioneer cabins, historic exhibits, and the steamer SS Nenana, one of the steamboats that traveled Interior Alaska rivers during the gold rush era. The summer exposition that opened the park in July 1967 was attended by U.S. Vice President Hubert Humphrey but was plagued by rain, financial problems, and low attendance.

One month after the celebration of Alaska's centennial, the worst disaster in Fairbanks history took place. In July 1967, Fairbanks received 3.34 inches (8.5 cm) of rain, almost double the July average of 1.84 inches (4.7 cm). Then between August 11 and August 13, Fairbanks and the Tanana Valley received the heaviest rainfall in recorded history. In the 24 hours before noon on August 12, 3.42 inches (8.7 cm) of rain fell. Average rainfall for the entire month of August is 2.20 inches (5.6 cm). In August 1967, 6.20 inches (15.7 cm) fell on Fairbanks and the Tanana Valley.

The unprecedented rainfall turned the Chena River into a torrent. On August 14, it passed flood stage and continued to rise. Because no hydrological equipment had been installed upstream of Fairbanks, residents were unaware of the flood's scale. All day and night on August 14, the water rose. It inundated the A-67 site and volunteers allowed water to fill the hold of the SS Nenana to keep it from floating on the rising waters and damaging buildings. In downtown Fairbanks, hundreds of volunteers built a sandbag dike around St. Joseph's Hospital to no avail. As the water crested the emergency dike, doctors, nurses, and patients evacuated to the University of Alaska on College Hill.

The university, which is built on high ground, served as an evacuation point and emergency shelter for thousands of flood refugees. The civil defense director of the university expected between 700 and 800 people to take shelter at the university. Between 7,000 and 8,000 showed up as the water rose through August 14 and 15 and crammed into facilities designed to house just over 1,000 students. A helipad was set up in a parking lot, and helicopters from Eielson Air Force Base ferried supplies to the refugees. Fairbanks' power plant was flooded, so the university depended on its physical plant to provide electricity for the refugees. When the rising water threatened to flood the plant, hundreds of the refugees massed to build barricades and pump out the plant's basement.

The flood had a massive effect on Fairbanks. Four people were killed, and the damage ran into the hundreds of millions of dollars. It helped push the city's remaining farm, Creamer's Dairy, into bankruptcy, and it forced the closure of St. Joseph's Hospital. Fairbanks residents responded to the problems with aplomb. The annual Tanana Valley State Fair was postponed but not canceled. Seven thousand dollars were raised to buy Creamer's Dairy and turn it into a bird sanctuary. KTVF, one of the few town businesses to have flood insurance, rebuilt its studio and became the first Fairbanks TV station to broadcast in color, four months after the flood. When two bond measures to build a government-run hospital were turned down by Fairbanks voters, residents raised $2.6 million from private contributions and $6 million from the state and federal government to build Fairbanks Memorial Hospital.

In the flood's wake, the U.S. Congress passed the National Flood Insurance Act of 1968, which provided funding to build the Chena River Lakes Flood Control Project on the Chena River upstream of Fairbanks. The project was built between 1973 and 1979 and diverts the Chena River into the Tanana River when the former river rises above a certain level. A chain of dikes were built along the Tanana River to prevent high water from that river flooding Fairbanks from the south. Many businesses benefited from low-interest federal loans to rebuild, which was done quickly. In 1969, Fairbanks was one of 11 cities honored as an "All-America City" by Look magazine and the National League of Cities in honor of its success in recovering from the flood.

== Oil boom ==
On March 12, 1968, an Atlantic Richfield drilling crew struck oil near Prudhoe Bay, about 400 miles (640 km) north of Fairbanks. The resulting discovery of the Prudhoe Bay Oil Field sparked a massive boom in Fairbanks, which was the nearest city to the field. After abortive attempts to transport oil from the field using seagoing tankers and airplanes, the oil companies developing the field decided to build a pipeline. Plans were set into motion and about to move forward when legal challenges halted the project in 1970. One set of challenges, those levied by Alaska Native groups in the path of the pipeline, was settled by passage of the Alaska Native Claims Settlement Act in 1971. Thirteen major Alaska Native corporations and dozens of smaller ones were created to manage the cash payment and land grants distributed by the federal government under the act. In 1972, Fairbanks became the headquarters of Doyon, Limited, the largest of these corporations.

The Fairbanks economy, which briefly boomed in the period between the discovery of oil and the legal challenge, stagnated as legal challenges dragged on. The challenges were ended by approval of the Trans-Alaska Pipeline Authorization Act in late 1973. When pipeline work began in early 1974, it sparked a boom in Fairbanks unlike anything since the years immediately after the city's founding. Alyeska Pipeline Service Company alone spent an estimated $800,000 a day in Fairbanks, which housed the construction headquarters on Fort Wainwright. Tens of thousands of workers poured into the city, straining the economy, infrastructure, and public works. The population of the Fairbanks North Star Borough increased by 40 percent between 1973 and 1976. The number of businesses in the area doubled during the same period.

This increase in population caused many adverse effects. Municipal Utilities Service, which operated telephone service, ran out of phone numbers and the waiting list for phone connections stretched to 1,500 entries. Electric demand was so high that the power company advised homeowners to buy generators to cope with frequent brownouts. Home prices skyrocketed—a home that sold for $40,000 in 1974 was purchased for $80,000 in 1975. Home and apartment rentals were correspondingly squeezed upward by the rising prices and the demand from pipeline workers. Two-room log cabins with no plumbing rented for $500 per month. One two-bedroom home housed 45 pipeline workers who shared beds on a rotating schedule for $40 per week.

The skyrocketing prices were driven by the high salaries paid to pipeline workers eager to spend their money. The high salaries caused a corresponding demand for higher wages among non-pipeline workers in Alaska. Non-pipeline businesses often could not keep up with the demand for higher wages, and job turnover was high. Yellow Cab in Fairbanks had a turnover rate of 800 percent; a nearby restaurant had a turnover rate of more than 1,000 percent. Many positions were filled by high school students promoted above their experience level. To meet the demand, Lathrop High School ran in two shifts: one in the morning and the other in the afternoon to teach students who also worked eight hours a day. More wages and more people meant higher demand for goods and services. Waiting in line became a fact of life in Fairbanks, and the Fairbanks McDonald's became No. 2 in the world for sales—behind only the recently opened Stockholm store. Alyeska and its contractors bought in bulk from local stores, causing shortages of everything from cars to tractor parts, water softener salt, batteries and ladders.

Fairbanks crime snapshot
	1976	1980	1985	1991	1995	1998
Homicides	0	5	5	1	2	5
Rapes	3	31	9	48	24	28
Robberies	48	7	43	41	55	45
Assault	21*	96	278	520	652	818
Burglary	124	332	348	398	279	45
Larceny	501	485	1,354	1,880	1,470	933
Vehicle theft	200	168	266	157	157	192
*Aggravated assault only

The large sums of money being made and spent caused an upsurge in crime and illicit activity. This was exacerbated because police officers and state troopers resigned in large groups to become pipeline security guards at wages far exceeding those available in public-sector jobs. Fairbanks' Second Avenue became a notorious hangout for prostitutes, and dozens of bars operated throughout the town. In 1975, the Fairbanks Police Department estimated between 40 and 175 prostitutes were working in the city of 15,000 people. In the frigid temperatures of the winter months throughout the 1970s it was common to see street-walking prostitutes in downtown Fairbanks, clad fully from head-to-toe in luxuriant fur coats (and leaving everything to the imagination). Prostitutes brought pimps, who then engaged in turf fights. In 1976, police responded to a shootout between warring pimps who wielded automatic firearms. However, the biggest police issues were drunken brawls and fighting, resulting in a situation akin to the lawlessness associated with the "Wild West" of the American frontier of popular lore.

By 1976, after the city's residents had endured a spike in crime, overstressed public infrastructure, and an influx of people unfamiliar with Alaska customs, 56 percent said the pipeline had changed Fairbanks for the worse. In downtown Fairbanks, overcrowding, traffic problems, and drunken rambunctiousness caused by pipeline workers pushed businesses to move into malls built away from downtown. New commercial centers like Gavora Mall, Bentley Mall, and others away from the city center drove the construction of freeways that bypassed downtown Fairbanks.

== Post-boom ==
Population
1910	3,541
1920	1,155
1930	2,101
1940	3,455
1950	5,771
1960	13,311
1970	14,711
1976	34,554
1980	22,645
1985	27,099
1990	30,843
1995	32,384
2000	30,224
2008 (Est.)	35,132

Pipeline construction ended in 1977, beginning a gradual decline in Fairbanks' economy. The loss of construction spending was mostly offset by state spending. Taxes on oil flowing through the pipeline were spent on low-interest loans, grants, and business assistance that poured money into the city. To entice businesses to return to downtown Fairbanks, the city demolished many of the bars favored by pipeline workers and attempted to attract a hotel or major business to the location. This effort was unsuccessful, and the land remained vacant until the late 1990s. Redevelopment of the Fairbanks airport was more successful. A new terminal built in 1984 functioned until 2009.

Bolstered by grants and subsidies, cultural events and institutions grew in Fairbanks. The Fairbanks Light Opera Theatre was created in 1970, and groups such as the Fairbanks Concert Association and the Northstar Ballet were also created at about the same time. Fairbanks largest arts event, the Summer Arts Festival, began in 1980 and continues today.

Sports facilities also benefited from the influx of state funding. The Big Dipper Ice Arena, a converted airplane hangar moved from Tanacross in 1969, went through a $5 million renovation in 1981 that allowed it to host the Arctic Winter Games the next year. In 1979, the University of Alaska built the Patty Center, the first full indoor ice arena in Interior Alaska. The same year, the school started an NCAA Division I hockey team.

Wien Air Alaska, which had its headquarters in Fairbanks, was the state's largest private employer until it declared bankruptcy in 1983. The resulting shutdown cost hundreds of jobs in Fairbanks. This was a foretaste of more problems to come. In 1986, Saudi Arabia boosted oil production and oil prices plummeted. Alaska banks failed, construction came to a halt, and bankruptcies and foreclosures were common. A common practice in Fairbanks was for workers to drop their house keys off at local banks before catching a flight out of Alaska, the better to speed the foreclosure process. Although an expansion of Fort Wainwright helped the construction industry during this time, Fairbanks lost about 3,000 jobs between 1986 and 1989. The U.S. Army's 6th Infantry Division was stationed at Fort Wainwright in late 1987, but it was reduced to a single brigade and renamed in 1993. In 1995, Fairbanks based airline ticket broker World Plus was shut down. It was found to be Alaska´s largest investment scam.

This period in the city's history also had some bright spots. To celebrate the 25th anniversary of Alaska statehood, the city commissioned a 25-foot sculpture of an Alaska Native family signifying "Alaska's first family". The statue is the centerpiece of Golden Heart Plaza, which was dedicated in 1986 on the south bank of the Chena River in the middle of downtown Fairbanks. In 1984, President Ronald Reagan and Pope John Paul II briefly met in Fairbanks after it was realized that their two separate visits to Asia would cross over Alaska at the same time. Approximately 10,000 people attended their meeting, which was the largest gathering of people in Fairbanks' history.

== Modern Fairbanks ==
As oil prices rose during the 1990s, Fairbanks' economy improved. The city was also boosted by the regrowth of gold mining in the area. The Fort Knox Gold Mine north of Fairbanks opened in 1997 after several years of development, and another gold prospect is likely to be developed in the next decade. The same year that Fort Knox Mine opened, Alyeska moved 300 jobs from Anchorage to Fairbanks, making the city the base of its operations for the first time in several decades.

The U.S. military remains a large presence in Fairbanks. The U.S. 1st Stryker Brigade Combat Team of the 25th Infantry Division is based at Fort Wainwright, and Eielson Air Force Base remains a training and logistics hub for the U.S. Air Force. In 2009, the U.S. Army announced that it is considering basing 1,000 additional soldiers at Fort Wainwright because of its ample space.

Utilities and other services also have significantly changed since 1990. Fairbanks Memorial Hospital was renovated and expanded in 1976, 1985, 1995, and 2000. In 2009, the hospital opened a new heart care center during its latest expansion. Bassett Army Hospital on Fort Wainwright went through a $132 million renovation in 2005. To meet the demand for a convention center and large sporting arena, the city paid for construction of the Carlson Center, a 5,000-seat arena that opened in 1990. In 1996, the city of Fairbanks privatized its utilities when the Municipal Utilities Service was sold to a private company. About $74 million from the sale was deposited into a savings account called the Fairbanks Permanent Fund, which was invested and managed in a fashion similar to the Alaska Permanent Fund, though residents do not receive any income from the Fairbanks Permanent Fund.
