= Polaris Building =

Demolished building in Fairbanks, Alaska

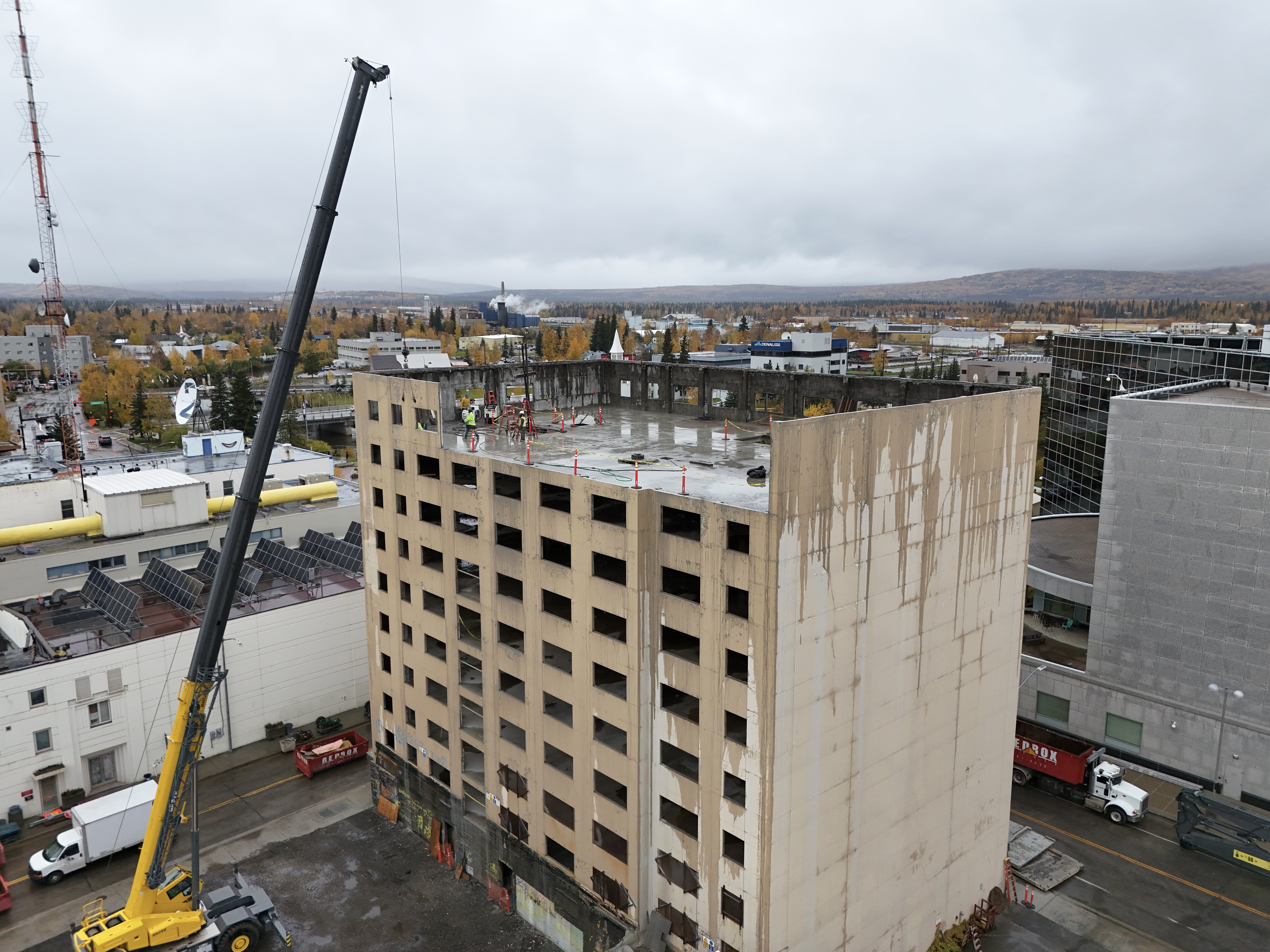
- The demolition in 2024
- Interactive map of the Polaris Building area
- Former names: Polaris Hotel, Northern Lights Hotel

General information
- Type: Apartments
- Location: Fairbanks, Alaska, U.S., 123 Lacey Street, Fairbanks, AK 99701
- Coordinates: 64°50′38.5″N 147°43′2″W
- Completed: 1952
- Demolished: 2023-25

Technical details
- Floor count: 11

The Polaris Building was the tallest building in downtown Fairbanks, Alaska. Constructed in 1952, it served as an 11-story apartment complex that later became the Northern Lights Hotel. However, the building gradually fell into disrepair, ultimately closing its doors after 800,000 gallons of water flooded its basement in 2001. In 2018, the City of Fairbanks foreclosed on the property over unpaid taxes. Demolition of the Polaris Building was completed in late 2025.

== History ==
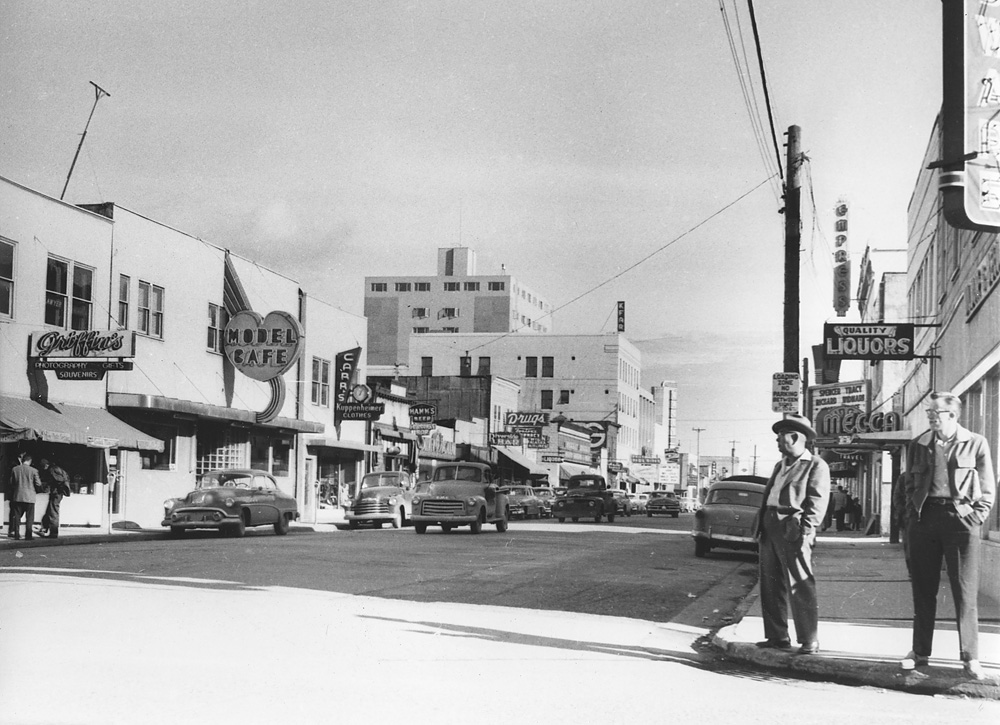
Looking east, down Second Avenue from Cushman Street in 1955. In the background is the Polaris Building.

The early 1950s were a period of unprecedented growth in Fairbanks as the federal government invested in upgrading Alaska's defenses for the Cold War. Both the Ladd Field and Eielson Air Force Bases saw increases in construction and additional personnel. The economic impact of this was significant and Fairbanks faced a housing shortage, which in turn sparked a building boom. It was at this time, in 1952, that the Polaris building was constructed to create apartments in downtown Fairbanks.

In 1953, a suite of offices opened in the penthouse of the 11th floor of the Polaris Building. E.B. Collins and Charles Clasby opened law offices in this space with a "breathtaking view of downtown Fairbanks".

The rapid economic growth in Fairbanks tapered off by the late 1950s, and by the end of 1957 there were about 1,000 vacancies in the Fairbanks area.

During the 1967 Fairbanks flood, downtown Fairbanks was flooded and the Polaris Building was evacuated. Water was five feet deep in Second Avenue.

The Polaris Building annex was constructed in 1972 and housed the Black Angus Steakhouse. By the 1970s, the top floor of the Polaris Building hosted a restaurant called the Petroleum Club, which was later replaced by a restaurant called Tiki Cove and in the 90's The Raven's Nest opened.

In 2001, 800,000 gallons of water flooded the basement of the Polaris building, and the building was abandoned in 2002.

Efforts to redevelop the Polaris Building encountered significant challenges and setbacks. Several owners, including Anchorage developer Marc Marlow, sought waivers and tax credits from government agencies to help restore the building. Marlow's plans included transforming the structure into a mixed-use building with office and retail spaces on the ground and top levels, complemented by apartments in between. However, Marlow's vision did not materialize into successful restoration.

The building was condemned in 2012, and a working group was formed in September 2015 to determine the next steps for the building.

== Notable events ==
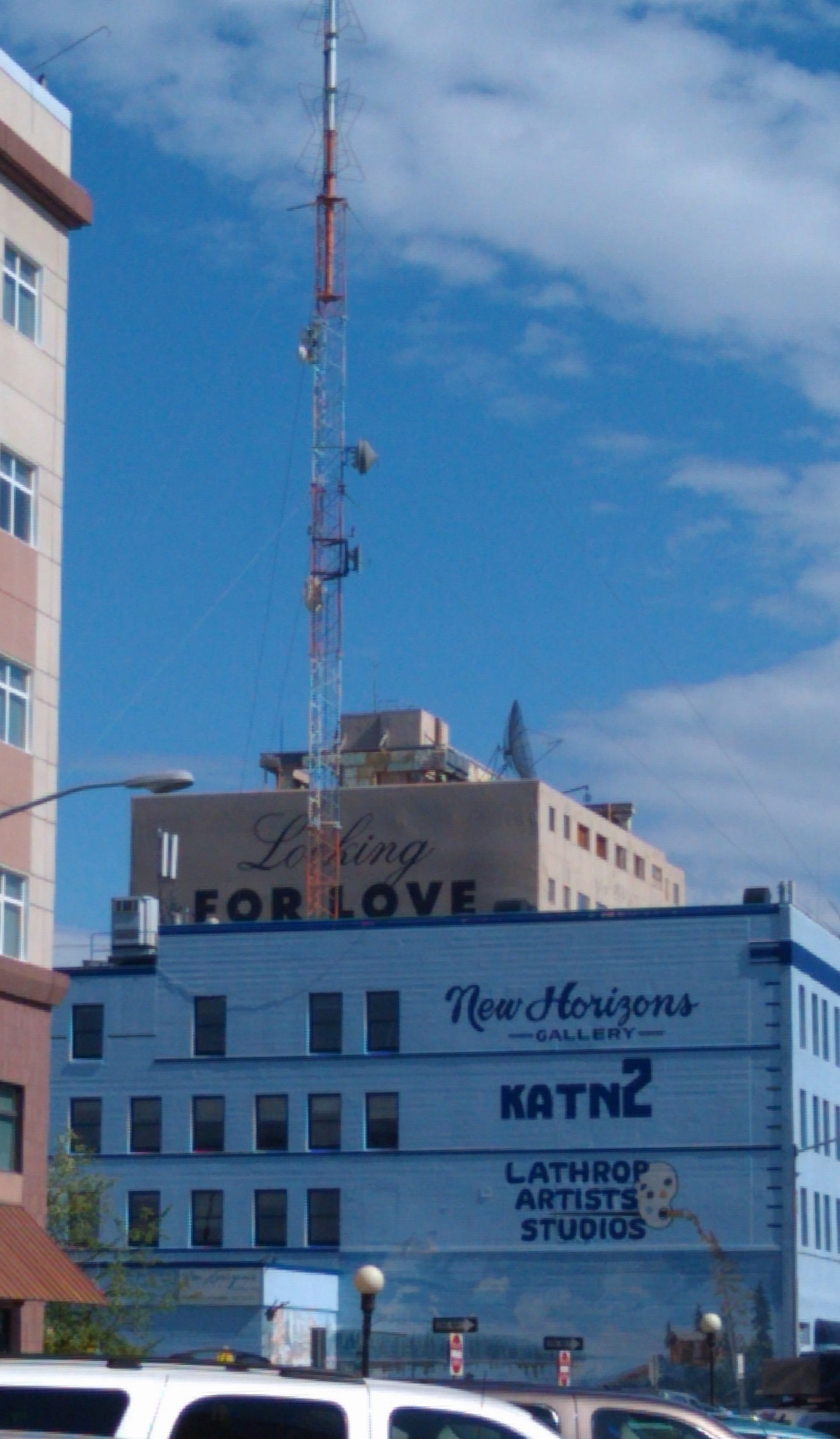
Polaris building "Looking for Love" behind Lathrop building

In 2011, The Alaska Design Forum, in collaboration with the National Endowment for the Arts (NEA), embarked on a public art project that aimed to ignite conversations about shared spaces. This project resulted in a giant banner with the words "Looking For Love Again" hanging on the west face of the Polaris Building.

The project sought to engage the public in a meaningful way and was designed by Candy Chang, a graphic and urban designer known for her work in struggling communities.

The project featured two chalkboards at the base of the building, inviting passersby to share their memories and hopes related to the Polaris Building. Drawing inspiration from a similar endeavor in New Orleans, Candy Chang sought to evoke a sense of community ownership and empowerment by encouraging individuals to articulate their desires for their neighborhood.

The 40 by 80-foot "Looking For Love Again" banner was vandalized and cut down in the summer of 2014.

== Demolition ==
After years of abandonment and unsuccessful redevelopment attempts, the Polaris building was scheduled for demolition.

In 2017, the City of Fairbanks commissioned an assessment of the main section of the 11-story Polaris Building. The assessment's findings revealed the presence of hazardous substances, including asbestos, mold, mercury, and polychlorinated biphenyls (PCBs). The discovery of PCBs necessitated the proper disposal of all materials, which required shipping them out of state for appropriate handling.

The property fell into foreclosure in 2018 due to unpaid taxes, and was purchased by the city of Fairbanks with intentions to demolish it. The city of Fairbanks paid the current deed holder $15,000 for the option to buy the deed for an extra $115,000 within two years.

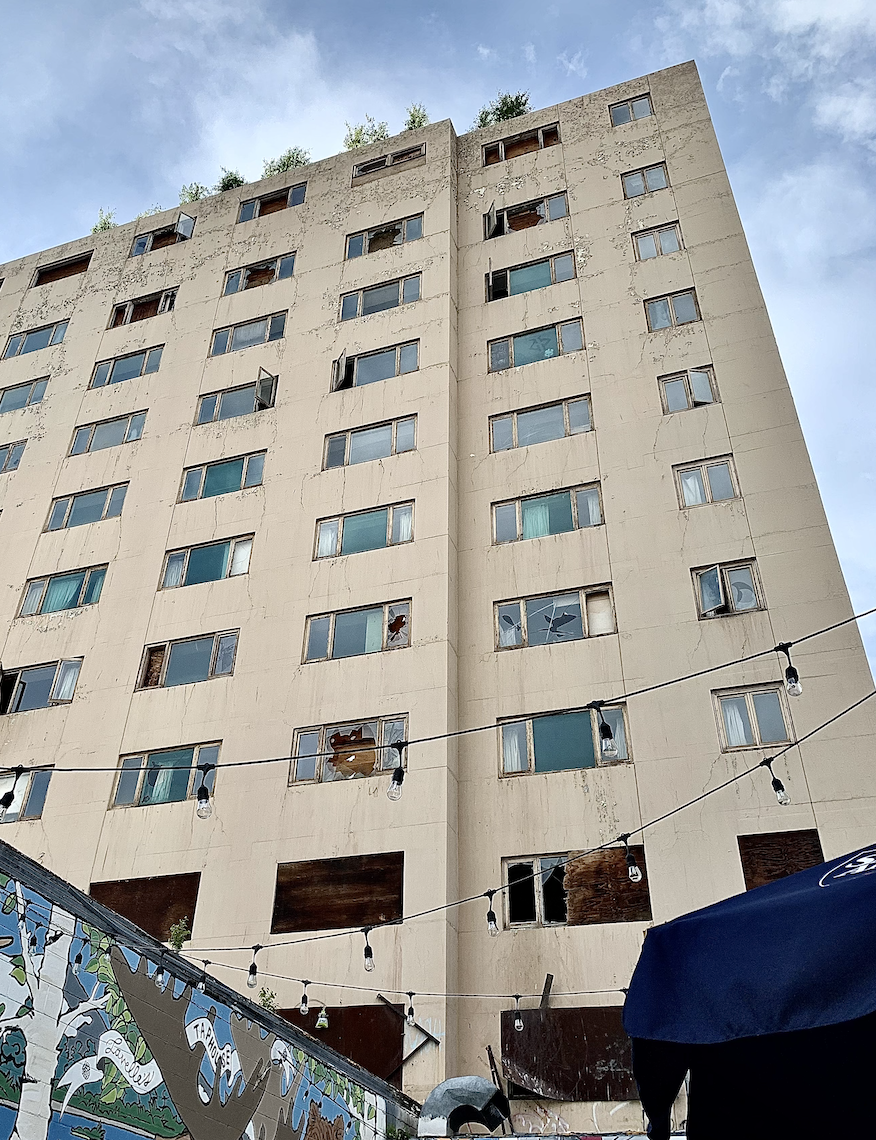
Boarded-up Polaris Building in 2021, from a nearby business patio

The City of Fairbanks applied for an Alaska Department of Environmental Conservation Targeted Brownfield Assessment in 2020, in order to continue their work towards redeveloping the property.

To assist with the cost of demolishing the Polaris Building and mitigating environmental hazards, Fairbanks received a $10 million earmark. The funding was secured through the efforts of Senator Lisa Murkowski and was awarded by the Environmental Protection Agency.

The demolition process commenced with the annex adjacent to the main structure, with the main Polaris Building itself commencing in spring 2024. The removal of the building proved to be a complex process due to its size and the handling of hazardous materials. The Mayor of Fairbanks, David Pruhs, suggested exploring the possibility of replacing the building with high-end condominiums, office spaces, and retail establishments.

Demolition of the Polaris Building was completed in late 2025. The city of Fairbanks is continuing to evaluate long-term redevelopment options for the site. In the meantime, the nonprofit Festival Fairbanks is using the area for temporary community activities, including a winter ice rink and small seasonal vendor huts. The city maintains ownership of the property, while Festival Fairbanks oversees routine operations.
