= World Plus =

Former Airline Ticket Broker

World Plus, Inc.
- Type: Privately held company
- Industry: Airline ticket brokerage
- Founded: , 1983;
- Founder: Rae Jean S. Bonham
- Defunct: September 18, 1995
- Fate: Dissolved
- Headquarters: Fairbanks, Alaska, United States
- Number of locations: 42
- Owner: Rae Jean S. Bonham

World Plus was an airline ticket brokerage operated by Rae Jean S. Bonham and based in Fairbanks, Alaska. The World Plus business model has been described as a Ponzi scheme, and as the largest investment scam in Alaska history.

== History ==
Born RaeJean Franklin in 1950, she moved with her husband Steve Bonham to rural Alaska in the early 1970s. RaeJean served as the postmaster of Chatanika, a small town north of Fairbanks, until 1977 when she was convicted of embezzlement and postal money order fraud.

She moved to Fairbanks and founded World Plus, Inc. in 1983. The travel agency engaged in the black market purchase and sale of frequent flyer miles. According to the U.S. Department of Justice, Bonham's World Plus became a Ponzi scheme in 1989, when she began soliciting larger investments in order to repay previous smaller investments. Over the next six years, the number of investors grew to roughly 1,200. Total contributions have been estimated between $15.3 million and $50 million.

In December 1995, World Plus was shut down by United States bankruptcy court after attorney Ken Lougee filed a petition in behalf of three creditors for involuntary bankruptcy, which appointed trustee Larry D. Compton to investigate Bonham's transactions. Compton subpoenaed bank records to determine the extent of the rather secretive pyramid scheme, which had spread primarily by word of mouth. Upon arrival in Fairbanks, Compton claimed to have received death threats from some of the more successful investors.

In United States v. Bonham (1998), Bonham pleaded guilty to federal charges of mail fraud and money laundering. For these, she was sentenced in 1999 to two concurrent sentences of five years (two suspended) plus ten years of probation.

During Bonham's Federal sentence, the State of Alaska filed additional charges of perjury and securities fraud. Bonham successfully argued that these should be dismissed on the basis that they constituted double jeopardy, but this decision was appealed by the State and overturned in 2001.

== Recovery ==
As of early 2008, Compton had filed 618 lawsuits against investors who had profited from their transactions with World Plus, recovering a total $18.2 million. From this sum he redistributed partial reimbursements to 697 known investors on whom Bonham had defaulted.
