= Alaska Loyal League =

Early 1900s small group of Fairbanks businessmen

The Alaska Loyal League was a small group of Fairbanks businessmen who were instrumental in supporting early Tanana Valley agriculture and enterprise. They included: A. Browning; George Coleman, manager of the Northern Commercial Company; F.S. Gordon, a merchant; H.B. Parkin, Fairbanks Meat Company transportation agent; E.R. Peoples, merchant; Harry E. St. George, real estate agent; William Fentress Thompson, editor and publisher of the Fairbanks Daily News-Miner; and R.C. Wood, a banker.

In April 1917, the League hosted a Farmers' Day lunch and convention, for the purpose of organizing area agriculturalists and making the valley agriculturally self-sufficient. They were behind the formation of a short-lived Farmers Bank, the Tanana Valley Agriculture Association, and later a Flouring Mill Corporation.
