= E. B. Collins =

American politician from Alaska (1873–1967)

Earnest Bilbe Collins

1st Speaker of the Alaska Territorial House of Representatives
- In office March 3, 1913 – March 5, 1917
- Preceded by: Office Established
- Succeeded by: Luther C. Hess

Member of the Alaska Territorial House of Representatives 4th district
- In office March 3, 1913 – March 5, 1917
- In office March 3, 1919 – March 7, 1921

Member of the Alaska Senate from the 4th district
- In office March 7, 1921 – May 5, 1921
- In office January 27, 1947 – January 22, 1951

Mayor of Fairbanks
- In office 1934–1938
- Preceded by: Arnold Nordale
- Succeeded by: Arthur Leslie Nerland

Personal details
- Born: Earnest Bilbe Collins; July 19, 1873 Farmland, Indiana, U.S.
- Died: September 28, 1967 (aged 94) Fairbanks, Alaska, U.S.
- Party: Republican
- Children: 1

Earnest Bilbe Collins (July 19, 1873 – September 28, 1967) was an American politician who served in the Alaska Territorial House of Representatives and senate as a member of the Republican Party. He also served as the first speaker of the house from 1913 to 1917 and as mayor of Fairbanks from 1934 to 1938.

== Early life ==
Earnest Bilbe Collins was born in Farmland, Indiana on July 19, 1873, to William John Collins and Elizabeth Robbins. He graduated from college in California in 1896 and read law at an attorney's office in Chico from 1896 to 1904.

He married May Imogene Kimball (1872–1934) on November 26, 1900, in California and went on to have a daughter: Margaret Henshaw (1901–1998). Following the death of his wife in 1934, Collins remarried on January 23, 1936, to Jenny Swensen Larson.

== Alaskan life ==
Earnest Bilbe Collins moved to Alaska in 1904 following the news of possible gold discoveries in the territory near Fairbanks. Collins went on to engage in small scale mining ventures from 1904 to 1918, while in the meantime studying and practicing law, ultimately passing the Alaska bar in 1915.

== Political career ==
Earnest Bilbe Collins was elected as a representative from the 4th district to the First Alaska Territorial Legislature in 1913. He also became the 1st speaker of the house on March 3 of that same year. On March 14, Collins introduced House Bill No. 2, also known as the Collins Women's Suffrage Bill. The bill proposed the right of women in the territory of Alaska to vote in all elections held within the territory. The bill passed the territorial senate by March 18 and was signed into law by Territorial Governor Walter Eli Clark shortly afterwards, marking Collins' first major legislation success. Collins won re-election to his seat and the speakership in 1915 and served those roles until March 5, 1917.

Collins served a third term in the Alaska Territorial House of Representatives from 1919 to 1921. At the end of his term, he was elected to the Alaska Territorial Senate for the 4th district and took office on March 7, 1921, before resigning on May 5, 1921. In November 1921, Collins was appointed as U.S. Attorney for the 4th Judicial District, a job which he would fulfill until his resignation in 1933 in order to co-found the law firm Collins and Clasby.

He was elected as Mayor of Fairbanks and served from 1934 to 1938. During his time as mayor, Collins oversaw some notable advances to the interior Alaska gold-mining community. After his mayorship came to an end, Collins was again elected to the Alaska territorial senate for the 4th District in 1947 and served as Senate President until 1951.

== Later life and death ==
Earnest Bilbe Collins decided to retire from Territorial Legislature before the 1952 elections, yet still went on to serve as a delegate to the Alaska Constitutional Convention in Constitution Hall on the campus of the University of Alaska in Fairbanks. Collins held the chair of the Committee on Direct Legislation, Amendment, and Revision and was also a Member of the Committee of Rules. He served as a delegate from November 8, 1955, until February 6, 1956, after which he retired from public life and moved to Sitka in 1961 before returning to Fairbanks in May 1967, where he died on September 28 of that year. He was buried in Birch Hill Cemetery in Fairbanks.

== See also ==
- List of speakers of the Alaska House of Representatives
- Alaska House of Representatives

Political offices
Preceded by Arnold Nordale	Mayor of Fairbanks; 1934-1938	Succeeded by Arthur Leslie Nerland
Political offices
Preceded by Office Established	Speaker of the Alaska Territorial House of Representatives; 1913-1917	Succeeded by Luther C. Hess
