= Talkeetna Air Taxi =

Airline of the United States

- Commenced operations: 1947; 79 years ago
- Headquarters: Talkeetna, Alaska, United States
- Key people: Paul Roderick, Director of Operations (Since 1996). Donald Sheldon, Founder
- Website: www.talkeetnaair.com

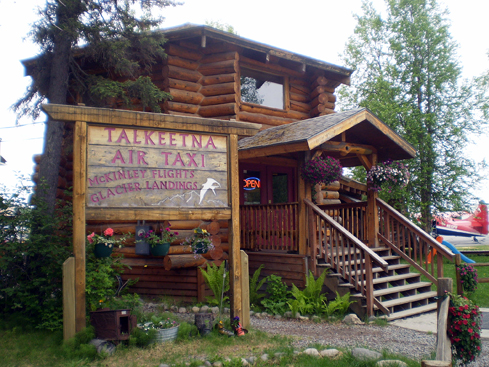
The Talkeetna Air Taxi office at Talkeetna Airport

Talkeetna Air Taxi, established in 1947 as Talkeetna Air Service, is a Talkeetna, Alaska-based flight company. It operates wheel-ski equipped bush planes, and is one of less than a half-dozen air services with a permit to land in Denali National Park. Historically, business included supply runs to remote homesteads and prospecting claims—though in the past decade traffic has been primarily tourist and climber related.

== TAT Fleet ==
As of August 2024, Takeetna Air Taxi fleet contains 8 aircraft and 2 helicopters.

Aircraft	In fleet	Passengers	Notes
Cessna 185 Skywagon	1	5	
Cessna 208B Grand Caravan	1	9	
de Havilland Canada DHC-3 Otter	6	10	Garrett engine
Robinson R44	2	3	

== Sightseeing tours and glacier landings ==
The fleet of Talkeetna Air Taxi flies Denali sightseeing tours to see glaciers, icefalls, massive mountains and Denali itself. Other landmarks include Mt. Foraker, Mt. Hunter, Ruth Glacier, Kahiltna Glacier, and Pika Glacier. From April to August, Talkeetna Air Taxi has scheduled 35 flightseeing tours a day. In August 2023, Talkeetna Air Taxi flew over 11,972 passengers.

== Climber drop-offs ==
In 2023, according to the NPS, Denali was climbed by over 1021 climbers; based in United States (670) and International (351). The average guided and non-guided Denali climbs average 17 days. Talkeetna Air Taxi is the main operator for flights that drop off climbers in Denali National Park from Talkeetna, Alaska. The Otter fleet is equipped with instrument-rated equipment that allows for flights into mountaineering conditions for frequent pick-ups and drop-offs. Climbers that have flown with Talkeetna Air Taxi include Jack Tackle, Steve House, Mark Twight, Marko Prezelj, Mark Westman, Ray Genet, Jim Donini, Colin Haley, George Lowe and Fred Beckey.

Talkeetna Air Taxi makes Denali Base Camp on the Kahiltna Glacier reachable, a base camp for the Denali Routes (West Buttress, West Rib, Cassin Ridge, South Face, South Buttress), Mt. Hunter/Routes (West Ridge, North Buttress, Rattle & Hum, Deprivation, Moonflower), Mt. Foraker (Infinite Spur and Sultana Ridge), as well as the Kahiltna Queen, Mt. Frances, Control Tower, Kahiltna Peaks, Kahiltna Dome, Crosson. Climbers have access to Ruth Glacier and the Ruth Gorge by air, with flights from Talkeetna Air Taxi.

Climbers have been dropped off at the West Fork of the Tokositna Glacier, for Northeast access to Mt. Hunter, and the East Fork allowing access to Mt. Huntington for the Harvard Route, West Face Couloir, and French Ridge. The Little Switzerland climbing area on the Pika Glacier provides access to The Throne, Middle Troll, Lost Marsupial, and the Royal Tower. Flying climbers are able to go to the Root Canal that includes Moose's Tooth, Ham and Eggs, Shaken Not Stirred, and the Bear Tooth. Coffee Glacier and Backside glacier, Buckskin glacier, Eldridge Glacier, Thunder Glacier, Yentna Glacier, and the Hayes Range (Mt. Hayes, Mt. Hess, and Mt. Deborah) are also serviced by Talkeetna Air Taxi.

Flights transverse to Tordrillo Mountains, a small mountain range in the Matanuska-Susitna and Kenai Peninsula Boroughs, that encompasses the Hayes Glacier, Capps Glacier, and Triumvirate Glacier. Finally, climbers can acquire access to the Kichatna Spires and the glaciers within.

== Kitties of TAT ==
The loyal hangar cat of Talkeetna Air Taxi was Beaver (2004-2024. Beaver passed away in the spring of 2024 in his sleep. The TAT staff of summer of 2024 adopted the current kitty of TAT, and after some heavy debate, named him Pratt Notacat Honeywell. Prior to being adopted he was raised by foxes.

== TAT landmarks ==
Located near Base Camp, Annie's Ridge, was named after the one and only Annie, the basecamp manager for over 20 years. Located at 62 ° 57' 35.28" N,151 ° 9' 30.24" W, at an elevation of 8460 ft (2578 m) across from the Southeast Fork Kahiltna Glacier from Denali Base Camp. Its spines have been a quick ski practice area for climbers. Other notable landmarks named after famed basecamp managers include Lisa's Peak and Frances' Peak.

== See also ==
- Air taxi
