= 2014 United States Senate election in Alaska =

- November 4, 2014
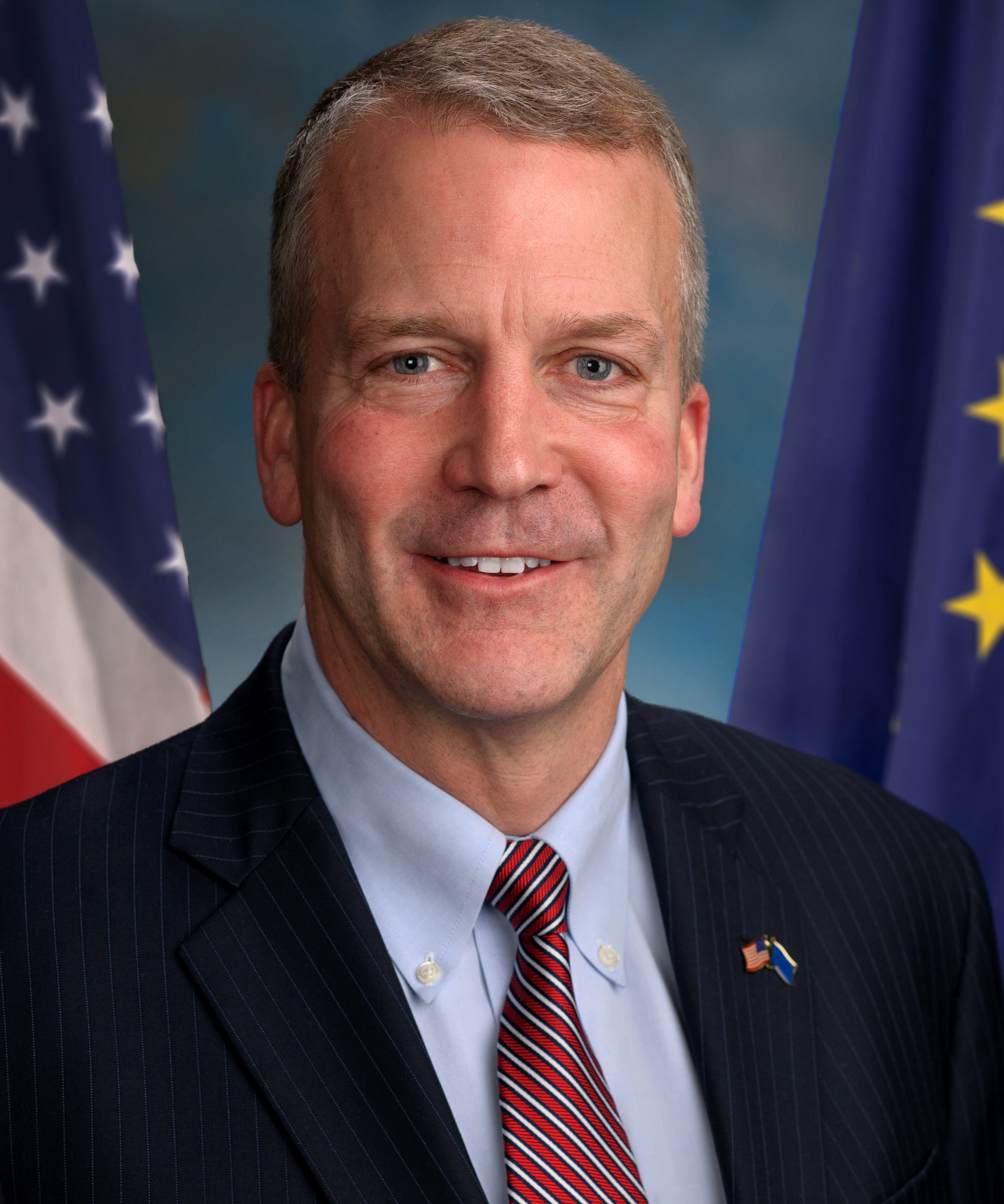

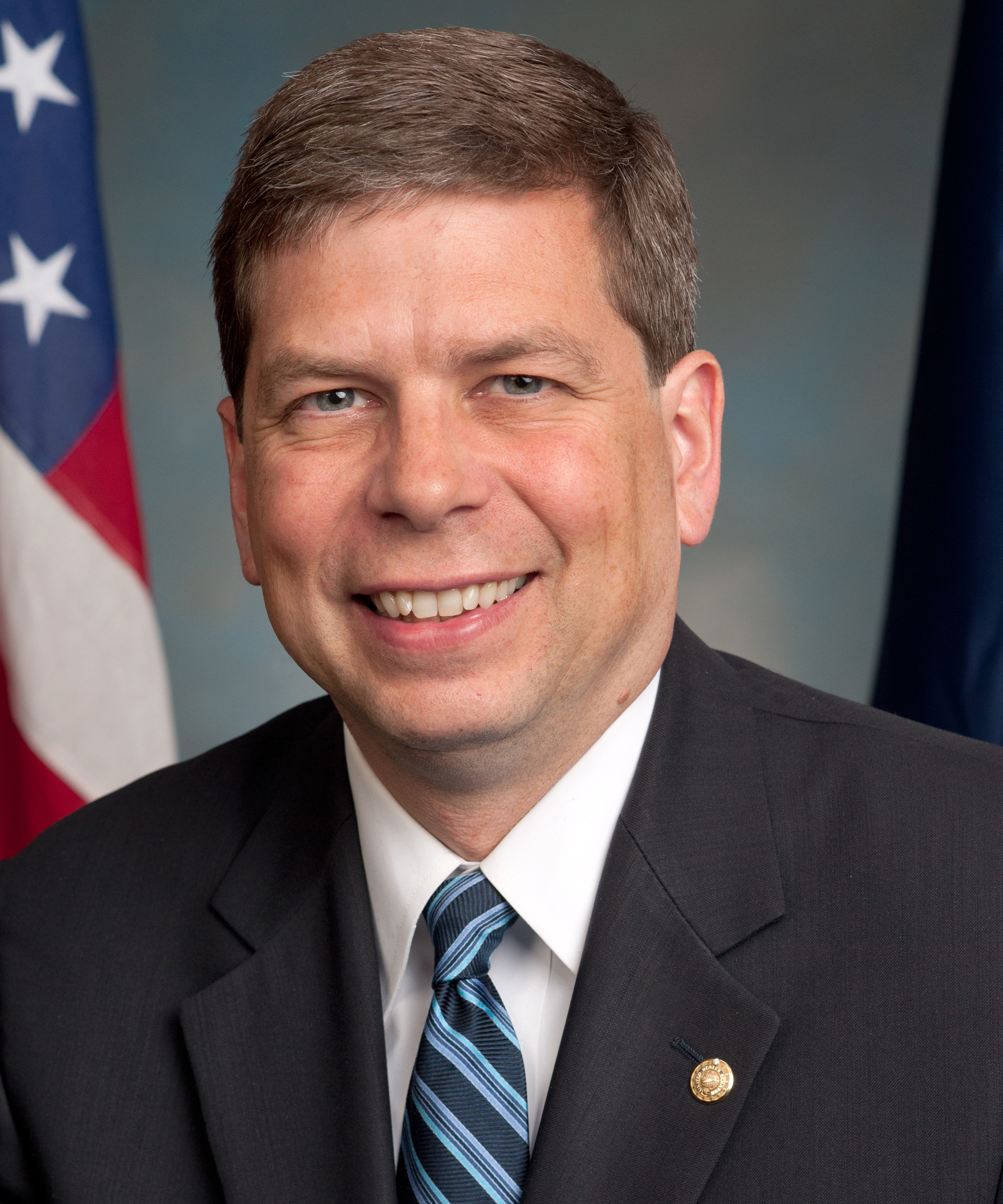
Nominee	Dan Sullivan	Mark Begich
Party	Republican	Democratic
Popular vote	135,445	129,431
Percentage	47.96%	45.83%
- Sullivan: 40–50% 50–60% 60–70% 70–80% Begich: 40–50% 50–60% 60–70% 70–80%
U.S. senator before election
Mark Begich
Democratic
Elected U.S. Senator
Dan Sullivan
Republican

The 2014 United States Senate election in Alaska took place on November 4, 2014, to elect a member of the United States Senate to represent the State of Alaska, concurrently with the election of the governor of Alaska, as well as other elections to the United States Senate in other states and elections to the United States House of Representatives and various state and local elections.

This was one of the seven Democratic-held Senate seats up for election in a state that Mitt Romney won in the 2012 presidential election. Incumbent Senator Mark Begich ran for re-election to a second term in office. Primary elections were held on August 19, 2014. Begich was renominated and the Republicans picked former Commissioner of the Alaska Department of Natural Resources Dan Sullivan.

On November 7, Sullivan held an 8,000-vote lead, which on November 11 had shrunk slightly to 7,991 votes. Multiple media outlets called the race for Sullivan on November 12 and Begich conceded to Sullivan on November 17. Republican Sean Parnell simultaneously lost the gubernatorial election to independent candidate Bill Walker, marking just the fifth time in the last 50 years in which U.S. Senate and gubernatorial incumbents from different political parties were simultaneously defeated in the same state. (Note: The others were 1990 in Minnesota, 1982 in Nevada, and 1978 in Massachusetts and New Hampshire.)

== Background ==
Democrat Mark Begich won the 2008 election, defeating seven-term Republican incumbent Ted Stevens by just under 4,000 votes. A few days before the election, Stevens had been convicted of a felony, but the case against Stevens was later dismissed by the Justice Department after the election, when serious issues of prosecutorial misconduct emerged. In the 2012 presidential election, Mitt Romney easily won Alaska by 13 points, which made Begich a prime target during an election cycle in which Republicans needed a net gain of six seats to retake control of the Senate.

== Democratic–Libertarian–Independence primary ==
Candidates from the Alaska Democratic Party, Alaska Libertarian Party and Alaskan Independence Party appear on the same ballot, with the highest-placed candidate from each party receiving that party's nomination.

=== Democratic candidates ===
==== Declared ====
- Mark Begich, incumbent U.S. Senator
- William Bryk, attorney and perennial candidate from New York

=== Alaskan Independence candidates ===
==== Declared ====
- Zachary Kile, orthopedic surgeon
- Vic Kohring, former Republican state representative

=== Libertarian candidates ===
==== Declared ====
- Mark Fish, former chairman of the Alaska Libertarian Party, former Sarah Palin and Joe Miller staffer and Republican nominee for the state house in 2008
- Scott Kohlhaas, former chairman of the Alaska Libertarian Party and perennial candidate
- Thom Walker, University of Alaska Brooks Range research station operations manager

==== Declined ====
- Joe Miller, former magistrate judge, Republican nominee for the U.S. Senate in 2010 and candidate for the U.S. Senate in 2014

=== Results ===
Democratic–Libertarian–Independence primary results
Party	Candidate	Votes	%
Democratic	Mark Begich (incumbent)	58,092	83.31%
Libertarian	Thom Walker	3,167	4.54%
Independence	Vic Kohring	2,557	3.67%
Democratic	William Bryk	2,024	2.90%
Independence	Zachary Kile	1,869	2.68%
Libertarian	Mark Fish	1,290	1.85%
Libertarian	Scott Kohlhaas	734	1.05%
Total votes		69,733	100.00%

=== Subsequent events ===
In an upset, the unknown Thom Walker won the Libertarian nomination despite not campaigning and raising no money. Libertarians speculated that he was a Republican "plant" designed to keep a more viable Libertarian from winning the nomination and then taking votes away from the Republican nominee in the general election. They further speculated that Walker was chosen because he shared a surname with Bill Walker (no relation), who was running as an independent candidate in the 2014 gubernatorial election, and that voters may have been confused because Bill Walker did not appear on the primary ballot and thus they may have voted for Thom Walker in error. This confusion could have extended to the general election, with voters picking Thom Walker for the Senate, thinking he was Bill Walker.

Walker withdrew from the race on August 27, saying that "my work location and schedule will have me out of town, out of contact and off the campaign trail for too long." The Libertarian executive board replaced him as the nominee with Mark Fish.

Alaskan Independence nominee Vic Kohring, who had changed his voter registration from Republican to Alaskan Independence just before the filing deadline, withdrew from the race on September 2 and endorsed Dan Sullivan. The Alaskan Independence Party did not name a replacement nominee before the deadline for them to do so had passed.

== Republican primary ==
=== Candidates ===
==== Declared ====
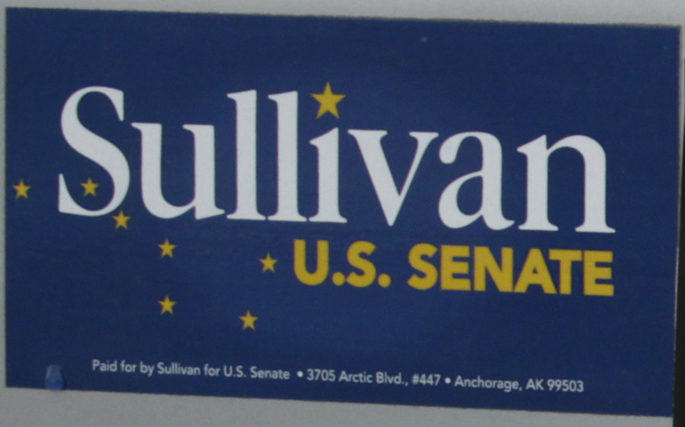
Bumper sticker from Sullivan's campaign

- John Jaramillo, air force veteran
- Joe Miller, former U.S. magistrate judge and nominee for the U.S. Senate in 2010
- Dan Sullivan, former Commissioner of the Alaska Department of Natural Resources and former Alaska Attorney General
- Mead Treadwell, Lieutenant Governor of Alaska

==== Withdrew ====
- Kathleen Tonn, anti-abortion activist

==== Declined ====
- Timothy Mark Burgess, judge on the United States District Court for the District of Alaska
- Loren Leman, former lieutenant governor
- Lesil McGuire, state senator
- Sarah Palin, former Governor of Alaska and nominee for Vice President of the United States in 2008
- Sean Parnell, Governor of Alaska (ran for re-election and lost)
- Dan Sullivan, Mayor of Anchorage (ran for Lieutenant Governor and lost)

==== Filed ====
- Ted Stevens, former U.S. Senator. Stevens had filed to run for his old seat, but he was killed in a plane crash on August 9, 2010.

=== Endorsements ===
Joe Miller

Individuals

- Sarah Palin, former Governor of Alaska and nominee for Vice President of the United States in 2008

Organizations

- Combat Veterans for Congress
- Gun Owners of America
Dan Sullivan

Individuals

- Lyman Hoffman, member of the Alaska Senate (Democrat)
- Condoleezza Rice, former United States Secretary of State
- Tara Sweeney, co-chair of the Alaska Federation of Natives

Organizations

- Club for Growth
Mead Treadwell

Individuals

- Jack Coghill, former lieutenant governor and Alaska Constitutional Convention delegate
- Mark R. Hamilton, former President of the University of Alaska
- Ryan Stassel, snowboarder
Declined to endorse
- Sean Parnell, Governor of Alaska

=== Polling ===
Poll source	Date(s) administered	Sample size	Margin of error	John Jaramillo	Loren Leman	Joe Miller	Sarah Palin	Sean Parnell	Dan A. Sullivan	Dan S. Sullivan	Kathleen Tonn	Mead Treadwell	Other/ Undecided
Moore Information (R-S. Sullivan)	August 4–5, 2014	500	—	—	—	17%	—	—	—	42%	—	25%	16%
Public Policy Polling	July 31 – August 3, 2014	337	± 5.3%	2%	—	20%	—	—	—	35%	—	29%	14%
Moore Information (R-S. Sullivan)	July 29–31, 2014	375	± 5.5%	—	—	16%	—	—	—	35%	—	27%	22%
Hellenthal & Assoc.	June 17–28, 2014	—	—	—	—	21%	—	—	—	35%	—	31%	13%
Moore Information (R-S. Sullivan)	June 16–18, 2014	500	—	—	—	13%	—	—	—	36%	—	27%	24%
Dittman Research (R-A. Sullivan)	May 27–29, 2014	500	± 4.4%	—	—	12%	—	—	—	37%	—	35%	16%
Public Policy Polling	May 8–11, 2014	313	± 5.5%	3%	—	14%	—	—	—	40%	—	26%	17%
Moore Information (R-S. Sullivan)	April 27–28, 2014	—	—	—	—	12%	—	—	—	38%	—	22%	29%
Public Policy Polling	January 30 – February 1, 2014	442	± 4.7%	2%	—	20%	—	—	—	30%	4%	25%	19%
Ivan Moore	December 15–22, 2013	335	—	—	—	19%	—	—	—	29%	—	34%	18%
Public Policy Polling	July 25–28, 2013	507	± 4.4%	—	—	12%	36%	—	—	15%	—	26%	11%
Public Policy Polling	July 25–28, 2013	507	± 4.4%	—	—	24%	—	—	—	25%	—	33%	19%
Public Policy Polling	July 25–28, 2013	507	± 4.4%	—	—	30%	—	—	—	—	—	53%	18%
Harper Polling	May 6–7, 2013	379	± 5.0%	—	—	14%	32%	—	—	—	—	30%	24%
Harper Polling	May 6–7, 2013	379	± 5.0%	—	—	19%	52%	—	—	—	—	—	29%
Public Policy Polling	February 4–5, 2013	537	± 4.2%	—	16%	17%	—	24%	19%	—	—	14%	11%
Public Policy Polling	February 4–5, 2013	537	± 4.2%	—	20%	19%	—	—	29%	—	—	23%	9%
Harper Polling	January 29–30, 2013	1,157	± 2.9%	—	—	12%	27%	32%	—	—	—	14%	15%

=== Results ===
Results by state house district Sullivan: 30–40%; 40–50%; Miller: 30–40%; 40–50%

Republican primary results
Party	Candidate	Votes	%
Republican	Dan Sullivan	44,740	40.05%
Republican	Joe Miller	35,904	32.14%
Republican	Mead Treadwell	27,807	24.90%
Republican	John Jaramillo	3,246	2.91%
Total votes		111,697	100.00%

== Independents ==
=== Candidates ===
==== Declared ====
- Ted Gianoutsos, founder of the Veterans Party of Alaska and perennial candidate
- Sid Hill, political gadfly
- Stubbs, cat and mayor of Talkeetna, Alaska

==== Declined ====
- Joe Miller, former magistrate judge and Republican nominee for the U.S. Senate in 2010

== General election ==
=== Fundraising ===
Candidate	Raised	Spent	Cash on Hand	Debt
Mark Begich (D)	$7,918,887	$8,487,590	$721,505	0
Dan Sullivan (R)	$6,093,368	$7,579,632	$449,506	$43,000

=== Debates ===
Begich and Sullivan participated in a televised debate regarding fisheries on August 27, 2014, at the University of Alaska Anchorage. Another televised debate concerning natural resources was held on October 1 in Kodiak, Alaska.

- Complete video of debate

=== Predictions ===
Source	Ranking	As of
The Cook Political Report	Tossup	November 3, 2014
Sabato's Crystal Ball	Lean R (flip)	November 3, 2014
Rothenberg Political Report	Tilt R (flip)	November 3, 2014
Real Clear Politics	Tossup	November 3, 2014

=== Polling ===
Poll source	Date(s) administered	Sample size	Margin of error	Mark Begich (D)	Dan Sullivan (R)	Other	Undecided
Public Policy Polling	November 1–2, 2014	1,052	± 3.0%	45%	46%	4%	5%
Public Policy Polling	November 1–2, 2014	1,052	± 3.0%	46%	47%	—	7%
Rasmussen Reports	October 27–30, 2014	887	± 4.0%	42%	47%	—	11%
Ivan Moore	October 24–26, 2014	544	—	48%	42%	7%	4%
CBS News/NYT/YouGov	October 16–23, 2014	561	± 9.0%	44%	48%	0%	9%
Harstad Strategic Research	October 18–22, 2014	700	—	44%	44%	4%	7%
Hellenthal & Associates	October 15–21, 2014	403	± 4.9%	49%	39%	7%	6%
Rasmussen Reports	October 8–12, 2014	700	± 4.0%	45%	48%	3%	3%
Fox News	October 4–7, 2014	706	± 3.5%	40%	44%	6%	10%
CNN/ORC	October 1–6, 2014	704 LV	± 3.5%	44%	50%	—	5%
CNN/ORC	October 1–6, 2014	875 RV	± 3.4%	44%	48%	—	8%
Hickman Analytics	September 26 – October 2, 2014	400	± 4.9%	41%	46%	4%	9%
CBS News/New York Times	September 20 – October 1, 2014	593	± 5.0%	42%	48%	2%	8%
Rassmussen Reports	September 23–24, 2014	750	± 4.0%	43%	48%	5%	4%
Marc Hellenthal	September 12–24, 2014	400	—	42%	46%	7%	5%
Public Policy Polling	September 18–21, 2014	880	± 3.3%	41%	43%	5%	11%
Public Policy Polling	September 18–21, 2014	880	± 3.3%	42%	45%	—	13%
Dittman	September 14–17, 2014	800	± 3.5%	43%	49%	—	8%
Hays Research/AFL-CIO	September 13–14, 2014	500	± 4.4%	41%	36%	23%	
Harstad Strategic Research	September 7–10, 2014	709	± 4.0%	45%	40%	7%	8%
CBS News/New York Times	August 18 – September 2, 2014	412	± 6.0%	38%	43%	6%	12%
Harstad Strategic Research	August 24–27, 2014	807	± 4.0%	41%	40%	10%	8%
ccAdvertising	August 21–24, 2014	4,403	—	31%	42%	—	27%
Rasmussen Reports	August 20–21, 2014	750	± 4%	45%	47%	3%	4%
Public Policy Polling	July 31 – August 1, 2014	673	± 3.8%	43%	37%	7%	12%
Public Policy Polling	July 31 – August 1, 2014	673	± 3.8%	45%	41%	—	14%
Harstad Strategic Research	July 20–24, 2014	808	± 4.0%	44%	37%	10%	9%
CBS News/New York Times	July 5–24, 2014	452	± 5.2%	46%	35%	9%	10%
Basswood Research	June 29–30, 2014	500	± 4.4%	40%	45%	—	15%
Moore Information (R-Sullivan)	June 16–18, 2014	500	± 4.0%	43%	43%	—	14%
Public Policy Polling	May 8–11, 2014	582	± 4.1%	42%	37%	7%	14%
Moore Information (R-Sullivan)	April 27–28, 2014	500	± 4.0%	44%	42%	—	14%
Magellan Strategies	April 14, 2014	603	± 4.0%	41%	46%	7%	6%
Rasmussen Reports	March 19–20, 2014	750	± 4.0%	44%	44%	3%	9%
Public Policy Polling	January 30 – February 1, 2014	850	± 3.4%	41%	37%	9%	13%
Harper Polling	January 20–22, 2014	677	± 3.8%	41%	47%	—	12%
Harper Polling	September 24–25, 2013	731	± 3.6%	43%	41%	—	16%
Public Policy Polling	July 25–28, 2013	890	± 3.3%	46%	39%	—	15%

Hypothetical polling

with Leman

Poll source	Date(s) administered	Sample size	Margin of error	Mark Begich (D)	Loren Leman (R)	Zachary Kile (AIP)	Other	Undecided
Public Policy Polling	February 4–5, 2013	1,129	± 2.9%	50%	40%	—	—	10%

with Miller

Poll source	Date(s) administered	Sample size	Margin of error	Mark Begich (D)	Joe Miller (R)	Zachary Kile (AIP)	Other	Undecided
Public Policy Polling	July 31 – August 1, 2014	673	± 3.8%	45%	32%	—	12%	11%
Public Policy Polling	May 8–11, 2014	582	± 4.1%	43%	27%	4%	2%	23%
Rasmussen Reports	March 19–20, 2014	750	± 4%	49%	38%	—	3%	10%
Public Policy Polling	January 30 – February 1, 2014	850	± 3.4%	45%	25%	5%	3%	21%
Harper Polling	January 20–22, 2014	677	± 3.76%	51%	32%	—	—	17%
Harper Polling	September 24–25, 2013	731	± 3.62%	55%	28%	—	—	18%
Public Policy Polling	July 25–28, 2013	890	± 3.3%	55%	32%	—	—	13%
Public Policy Polling	February 4–5, 2013	1,129	± 2.9%	58%	30%	—	—	12%
Harper Polling	January 29–30, 2013	1,157	± 2.88%	52%	29%	—	—	19%

Poll source	Date(s) administered	Sample size	Margin of error	Mark Begich (D)	Dan Sullivan (R)	Joe Miller (I)	Other	Undecided
Hays Research Group	February 9, 2014	502	± 3.3%	45%	33%	10%	—	—

with Palin

Poll source	Date(s) administered	Sample size	Margin of error	Mark Begich (D)	Sarah Palin (R)	Zachary Kile (AIP)	Other	Undecided
Public Policy Polling	May 8–11, 2014	582	± 4.1%	41%	35%	6%	3%	15%
Public Policy Polling	January 30 – February 1, 2014	850	± 3.4%	44%	40%	4%	2%	11%
Hays Research Group	August 14–15, 2013	388	± 4.9%	55%	37%	—	—	8%
Public Policy Polling	July 25–28, 2013	890	± 3.3%	52%	40%	—	—	8%
Public Policy Polling	February 4–5, 2013	1,129	± 2.9%	54%	38%	—	—	8%
Harper Polling	January 29–30, 2013	1,157	± 2.88%	47%	40%	—	—	13%

with Parnell

Poll source	Date(s) administered	Sample size	Margin of error	Mark Begich (D)	Sean Parnell (R)	Undecided
Public Policy Polling	February 4–5, 2013	1,129	± 2.9%	48%	48%	4%
Harper Polling	January 29–30, 2013	1,157	± 2.88%	40%	46%	14%

with Dan A. Sullivan

Poll source	Date(s) administered	Sample size	Margin of error	Mark Begich (D)	Dan A. Sullivan (R)	Undecided
Public Policy Polling	February 4–5, 2013	1,129	± 2.9%	47%	41%	12%

with Treadwell

Poll source	Date(s) administered	Sample size	Margin of error	Mark Begich (D)	Mead Treadwell (R)	Zachary Kile (AIP)	Other	Undecided
Public Policy Polling	July 31 – August 1, 2014	673	± 3.8%	42%	37%	—	8%	12%
Public Policy Polling	July 31 – August 1, 2014	673	± 3.8%	44%	41%	—	—	15%
CBS News/New York Times	July 5–24, 2014	452	± 5.8%	47%	45%	—	9%	10%
Public Policy Polling	May 8–11, 2014	582	± 4.1%	41%	33%	6%	3%	17%
Rasmussen Reports	March 19–20, 2014	750	± 4%	43%	47%	—	3%	6%
Public Policy Polling	January 30 – February 1, 2014	850	± 3.4%	43%	37%	5%	2%	13%
Harper Polling	January 20–22, 2014	677	± 3.76%	41%	47%	—	—	12%
Harper Polling	September 24–25, 2013	731	± 3.62%	43%	42%	—	—	15%
Hays Research Group	August 14–15, 2013	388	± 4.9%	50.4%	38.5%	—	—	11.1%
Public Policy Polling	July 25–28, 2013	890	± 3.3%	44%	40%	—	—	17%
Public Policy Polling	February 4–5, 2013	1,129	± 2.9%	47%	39%	—	—	14%
Harper Polling	January 29–30, 2013	1,157	± 2.88%	44%	34%	—	—	22%

=== Results ===
2014 United States Senate election in Alaska
Party	Candidate	Votes	%	±%
Republican	Dan Sullivan	135,445	47.96%	+1.46%
Democratic	Mark Begich (incumbent)	129,431	45.83%	−1.94%
Libertarian	Mark Fish	10,512	3.72%	+1.94%
Independent	Ted Gianoutsos	5,636	2.00%	+1.56%
Write-in		1,376	0.49%	+0.15%
Total votes		282,400	100.00%	N/A
Republican gain from Democratic				

==== Boroughs and Census Areas that flipped from Democratic to Republican ====
- Fairbanks North Star (largest city: Fairbanks)
- Kodiak Island (largest city: Kodiak Island)
- Petersburg

==== Boroughs and Census Areas that flipped Republican to Democratic ====
- Aleutians East Borough (largest city: Akutan)

== See also ==
- 2014 Alaska gubernatorial election
- 2014 United States Senate elections
- 2014 United States elections
- Stubbs (cat), notable write-in candidate and honorary Mayor of Talkeetna, Alaska
