= Royal Tower (Alaska) =

Mountain in Alaska, United States

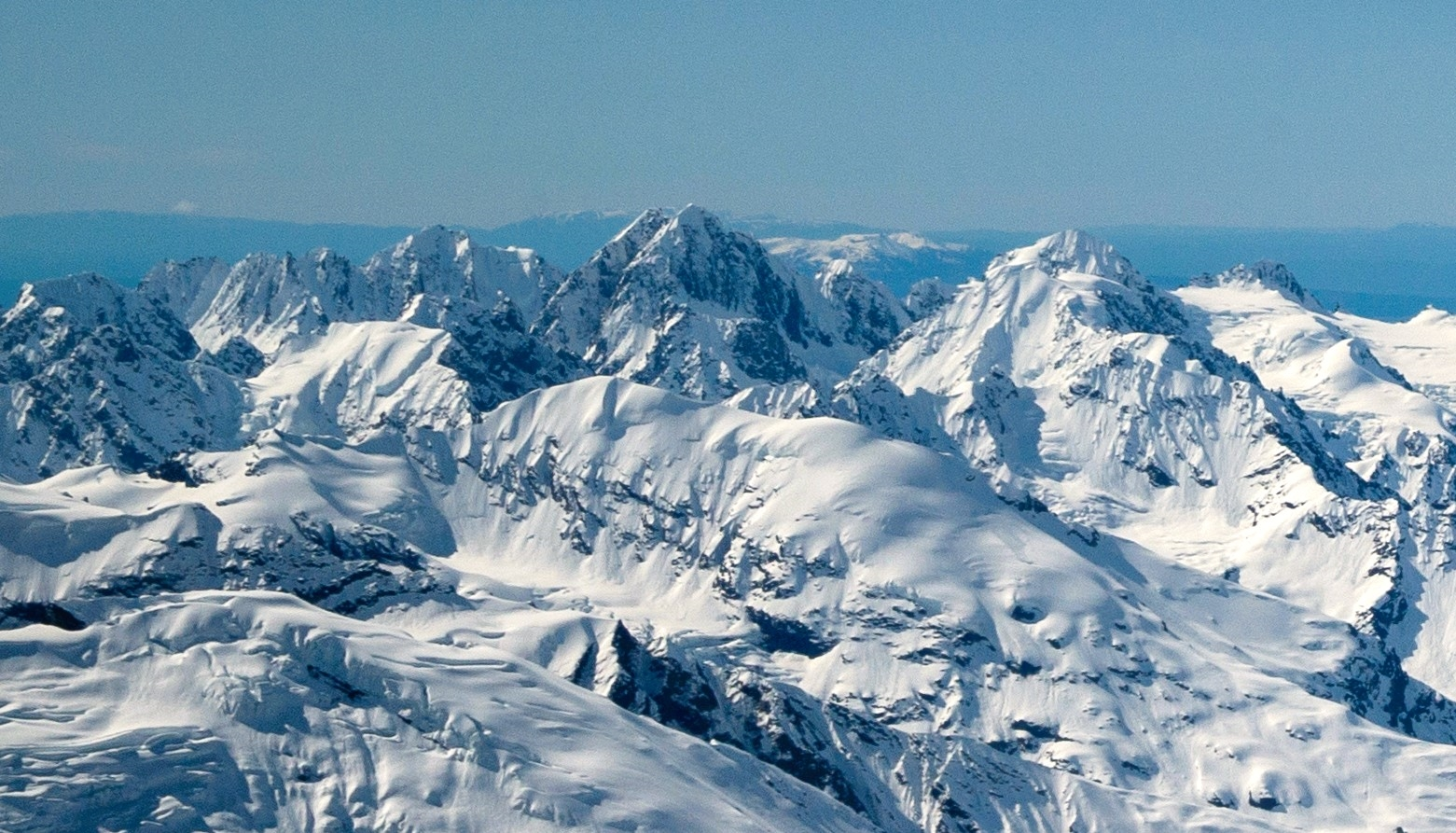
- North aspect, centered at top

Highest point
- Elevation: 8,130 ft (2,478 m)
- Prominence: 2,202 ft (671 m)
- Parent peak: Peak 8610
- Isolation: 4.42 mi (7.11 km)
- Coordinates: 62°42′00″N 151°13′25″W

Geography
- Location within Alaska
- Country: United States
- State: Alaska
- Borough: Matanuska-Susitna
- Protected area: Denali National Park
- Parent range: Alaska Range
- Topo map: USGS Talkeetna C-3

Geology
- Rock type: Granite

Climbing
- First ascent: July 1976
- Easiest route: Expedition climbing class 5.8

Royal Tower is an 8,130-foot-elevation (2,478-meter) mountain summit in Alaska.

== Description ==
Royal Tower is located 50 miles (80 km) northwest of Talkeetna in Denali National Park and the Alaska Range. It is set 7.46 mi (12 km) south of Avalanche Spire and 26 mi (42 km) south of Denali in an area known as Little Switzerland. Topographic relief is significant as the summit rises over 2,600 feet (792 meters) above the Pika Glacier in 0.4 mile (0.64 km). Precipitation runoff and glacial meltwater from the mountain drains to the Kahiltna River. The first ascent of the summit was made July 19–20, 1976, by Brian Okonek, Roger Robinson, and Ken Cook via the east face and northeast ridge.

== Climate ==
Based on the Köppen climate classification, Royal Tower is located in a tundra climate zone with long, cold, snowy winters, and cool summers. Weather systems are forced upwards by the Alaska Range (orographic lift), causing heavy precipitation in the form of snowfall. Winter temperatures can drop below −10 °F with wind chill factors below −20 °F. This climate supports the Kahiltna Glacier west of the peak and smaller unnamed glaciers surrounding the peak. The months May through June offer the most favorable weather for viewing or climbing.

== See also ==
- Mountain peaks of Alaska
- Geography of Alaska
