= Talkeetna Historic District =

Historic village center of Talkeetna, Alaska

- U.S. National Register of Historic Places
- U.S. Historic district
- Alaska Heritage Resources Survey
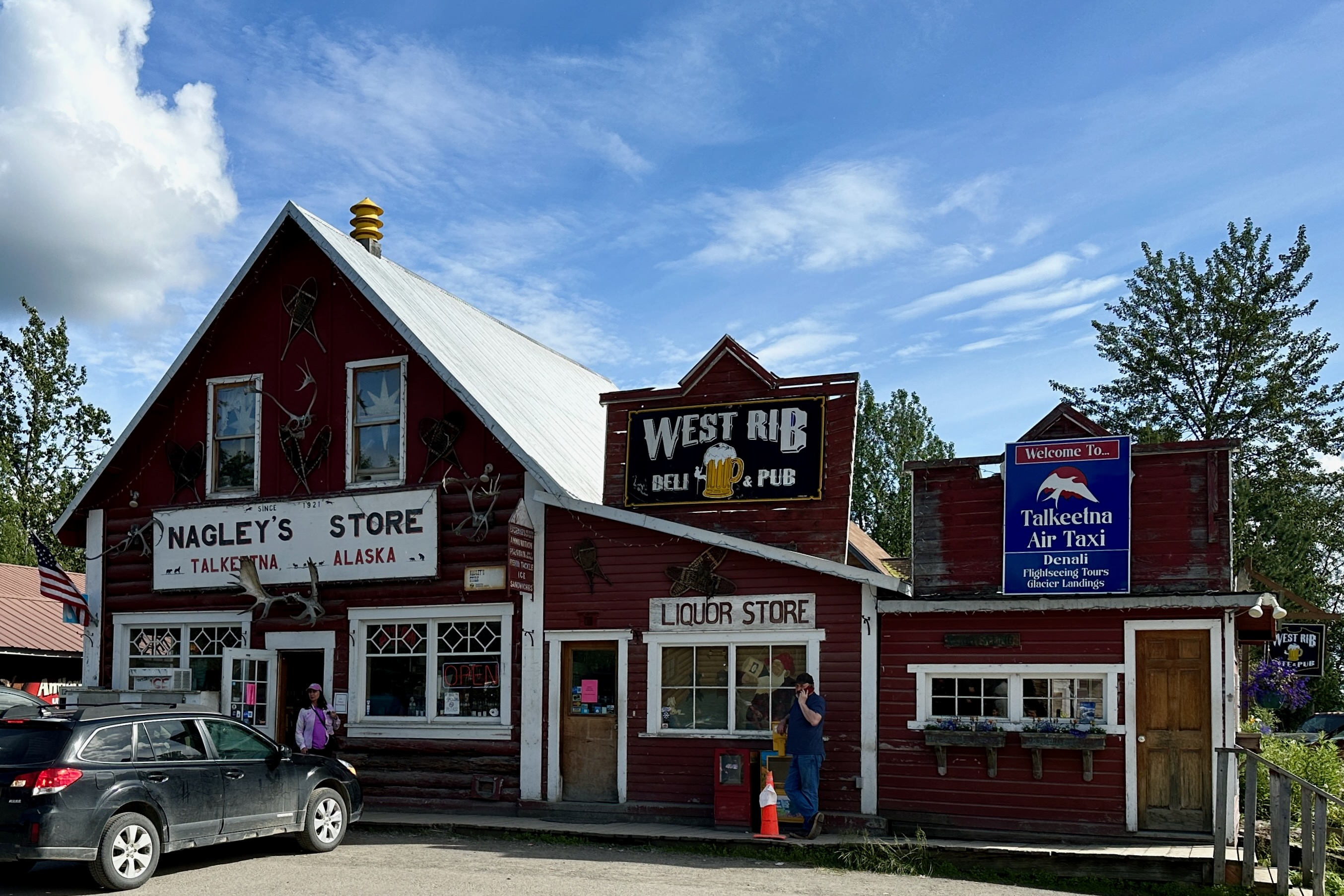
- Nagley's Store in 2023

- Location within Alaska
- Location: Roughly bounded by C Street, East First Street, D Street and Front Street, Talkeetna, Alaska
- Coordinates: 62°19′23″N 150°06′52″W
- Area: 6.4 acres (2.6 ha)
- Built: 1917
- NRHP reference No.: 93000321
- AHRS No.: TAL-033
- Added to NRHP: April 26, 1993

The Talkeetna Historic District encompasses several blocks of the historic village center of Talkeetna, Alaska. It includes buildings on Main Street, roughly between C and D Streets, along with a few buildings on C and D Streets between Front and East First Streets. The village was established in 1916 as a regional construction headquarters of the Alaska Railroad, and became a home to area miners after the railroad's completion. The district includes three buildings that date to the time of the railroad construction, and another ten that were built before 1940. Most of the buildings in the district are one or two stories in height, and are either of wood frame or log construction. Notable among them are the Fairview Inn, the town's first schoolhouse, now the Talkeetna Museum, and the Talkeetna Roadhouse, which was built as a residential log house in 1917 and expanded in the 1940s to serve as a roadhouse.

The district was listed on the National Register of Historic Places in 1993.

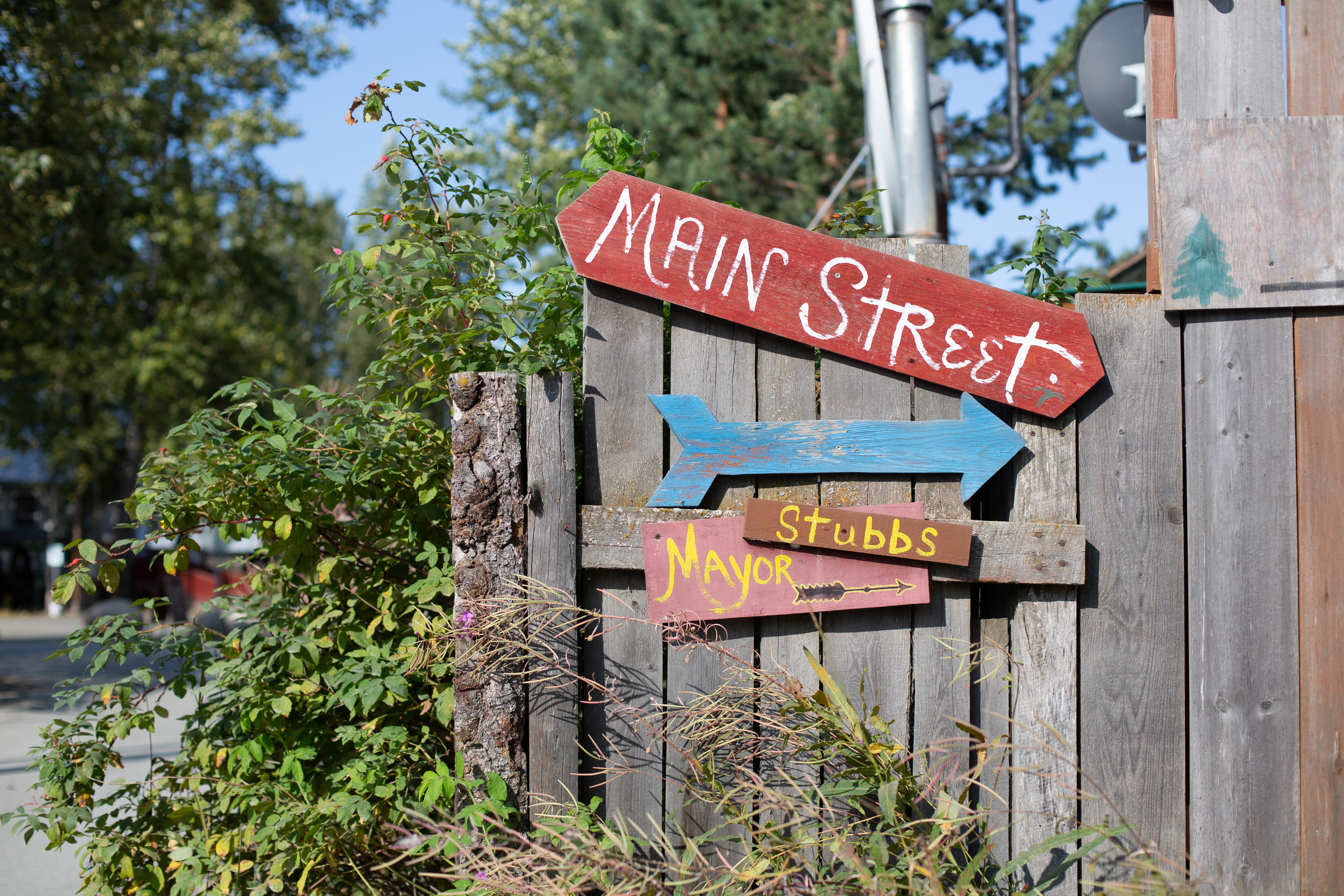
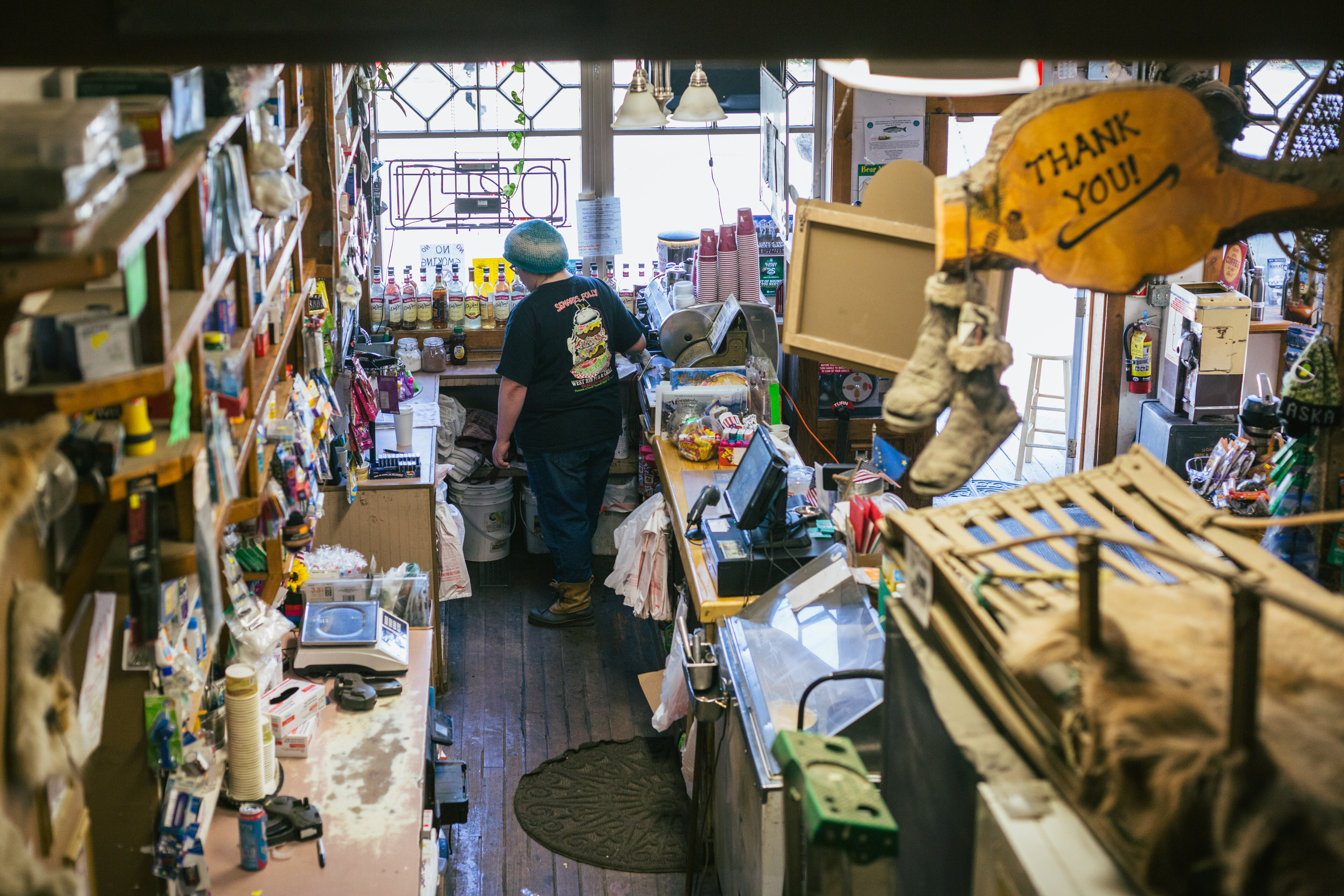
Talkeetna, Alaska

== See also ==
- National Register of Historic Places listings in Matanuska-Susitna Borough, Alaska
