= Talkeetna Airstrip =

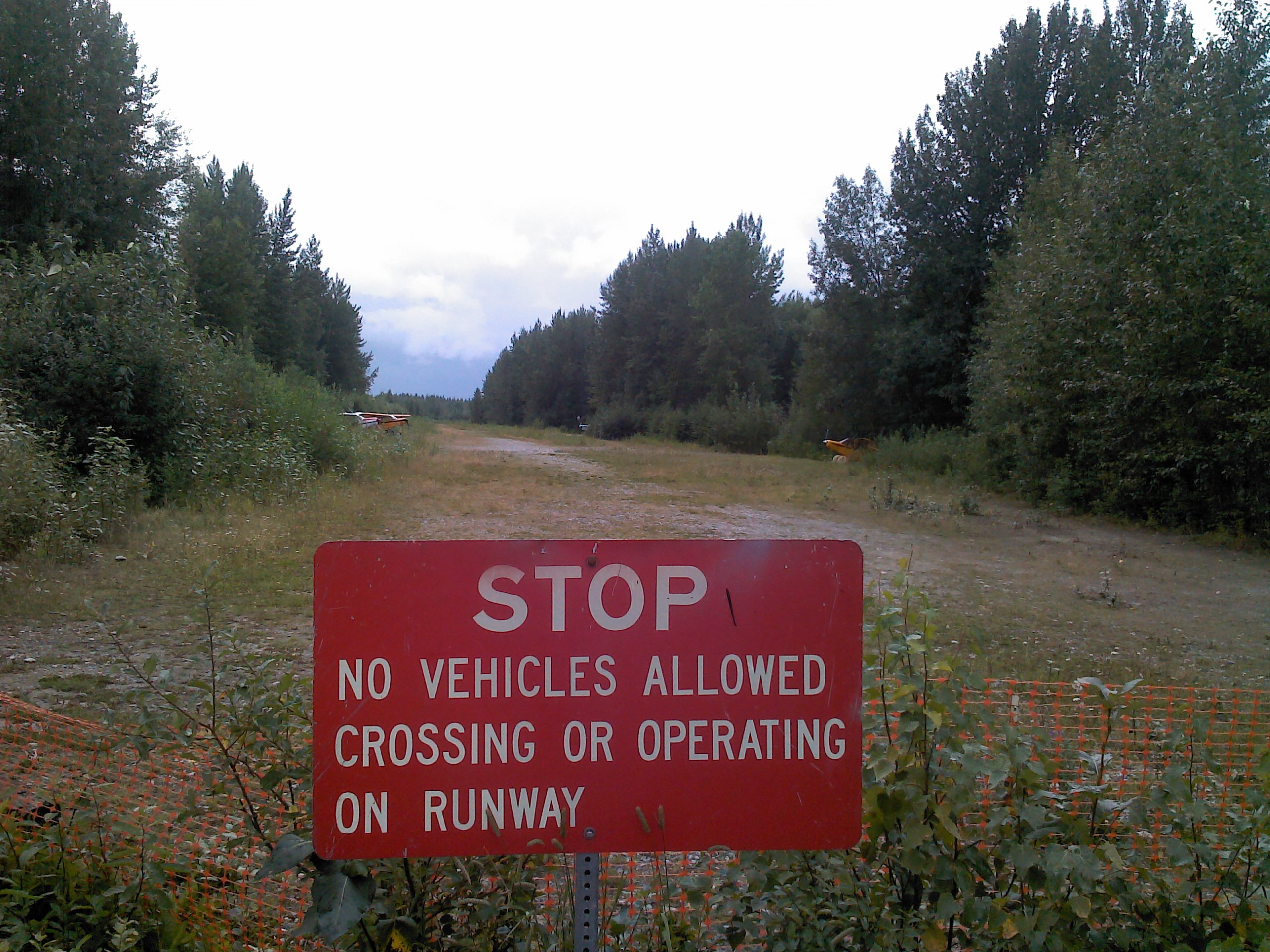
- IATA: none; ICAO: none; FAA LID: AK44

Summary
- Airport type: Public
- Owner: Bureau of Land Management
- Serves: Talkeetna, Alaska
- Elevation AMSL: 346 ft (105 m)
- Interactive map of Talkeetna Airstrip

Runways
Direction	Length		Surface
Direction	ft	m	Surface
16/34	1,600	488	Gravel
- Talkeetna Airstrip
- U.S. National Register of Historic Places
- Alaska Heritage Resources Survey
- Location within Alaska
- Location: Along D Street, from East First Street to the Susitna River in Talkeetna, Alaska
- Coordinates: 62°19′12″N 150°06′48″W
- Area: 19.95 acres (8.07 ha)
- Built: 1940
- Built by: Civilian Aeronautics Administration
- NRHP reference No.: 02000814
- AHRS No.: TAL-038
- Added to NRHP: August 2, 2002

The Talkeetna Airstrip is a historic runway in Talkeetna, Alaska. It is a rectangular area of land, covered by grass and gravel, extending southward along D Street from First Street toward the Susitna River. It is about 1,800 feet (550 m) long and 30 feet (9.1 m) wide, with its northern stretch now lined with private residences and its southern stretch surrounded by public woodlands. The airstrip was created in 1940 as the result of a presidential executive order issued by President Franklin Delano Roosevelt in 1937, which set aside federal land near Talkeetna for aviation-related purposes. It played a major role in the economic development of the community, as air transport was the most reliable method of bringing supplies and travelers into the area.

The airstrip was listed on the National Register of Historic Places in 2002, at which time it was still occasionally used for aviation. Most aviation now uses the state-owned Talkeetna Airport, located east of the village center.

== See also ==
- National Register of Historic Places listings in Matanuska-Susitna Borough, Alaska
