= Wilderness Woman Contest =

The Wilderness Woman Contest is organised by the Talkeetna Bachelor Society and is held in Talkeetna, Alaska on the first weekend of December. The contest began in 1986 and is open to single women aged 21 or older. The winner gets a fur hat, a plaque, and sometimes a trip to Europe.

The contest includes at least three timed events highlighting the skills that a Talkeetna bachelor would find most desirable in a woman. The events change from year to year, but have included:

- hauling firewood
- fetching water
- driving a snow-machine
- harnessing a sled-dog team
- catching fish
- climbing a tree
- shooting a moose or a ptarmigan
- making a sandwich and opening a beverage for a reclining bachelor watching Sunday-afternoon football on a simulated TV

The Annual Bachelor Society Benefit Auction and Bachelor Ball takes place in the evening after the Wilderness Woman Contest. The winner is crowned and contestants bid on eligible bachelors. Only single ladies aged over 21, and members of the Talkeetna Bachelor Society, are permitted to enter the auction room.
