= Whole Wheat Radio =

Community radio station in Alaska, U.S.

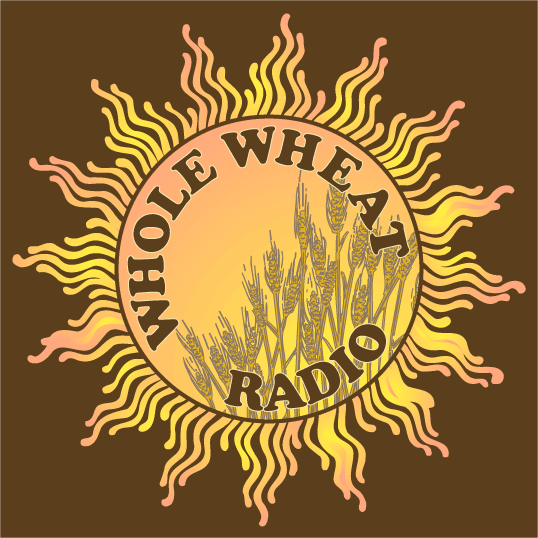
- Talkeetna, Alaska; United States
- Broadcast area: Internet radio

Programming
- Language: English
- Format: Independent music

Ownership
- Owner: Jim Kloss

History
- First air date: August 2002 (as Radio Free Talkeetna)
- Last air date: October 20, 2010

Technical information
- Transmitter coordinates: 62°18′41″N 150°5′13″W

Links
- Website: wholewheatradio.org

Whole Wheat Radio was a not-for-profit, listener-driven online community radio station from Talkeetna, Alaska. It was centered around independent music, and aired 24 hours a day.

The station pioneered several social and technical webcast feats, including the use of wiki software to collaboratively catalogue music, interactive house concerts where listeners could comment and tip the artists, electronic DJs (dubbed "EJs"), listener phonegrams, and its recorded shows were among the first available podcasts.

After eight years of uninterrupted broadcast, the station closed on October 20, 2010.

== History ==
Whole Wheat Radio began as "Radio Free Talkeetna" in August 2002. Software developer James (Jim) Kloss started the live interactive webcast immediately after DSL internet arrived in the small village of Talkeetna, Alaska. Jim was known online for his development of the nochange BBS and XChange file transfer program. Jim Kloss died in 2023, survived by his wife Esther Golton. A Celebration of Life was held in his hometown of Columbus, Ohio in July 2023.

The site changed its name to Whole Wheat Radio by December 2002.

The site was first broadcast from an existing 12x12 foot cabin built by Esther. In July 2004, a more permanent structure dubbed The Wheat Hole was built to accommodate an in-house audience of 50. In 2008, the venue was moved to a "renovated log saloon" dubbed The Wheat Palace to accommodate more patrons, and to host other activities.

== Music and programming ==
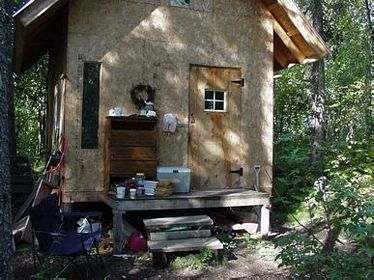
The original 12x12 Whole Wheat Radio cabin

Whole Wheat Radio played independent music, initially due to commercial licensing costs. The site evolved into a vehicle for promoting independent artists, helped by Jim's partner and musician Esther Golton. Artists gave permission and sent CDs for their music to be played on the station.

Genres weren't restricted, but favoured acoustic and folk music.

The site hosted numerous house concerts which were broadcast live, including Marian Call, Rod Picott, Jeffrey Foucault, Amanda Shires, and Danny Schmidt. Proceeds from the concerts were given to the performers, often exceeding income artists grossed from traditional media events.

The stream also included aspects of talk radio, from 15 minute rants to full morning shows. After airing, these were taped and made available as podcasts.

== Technology and community ==
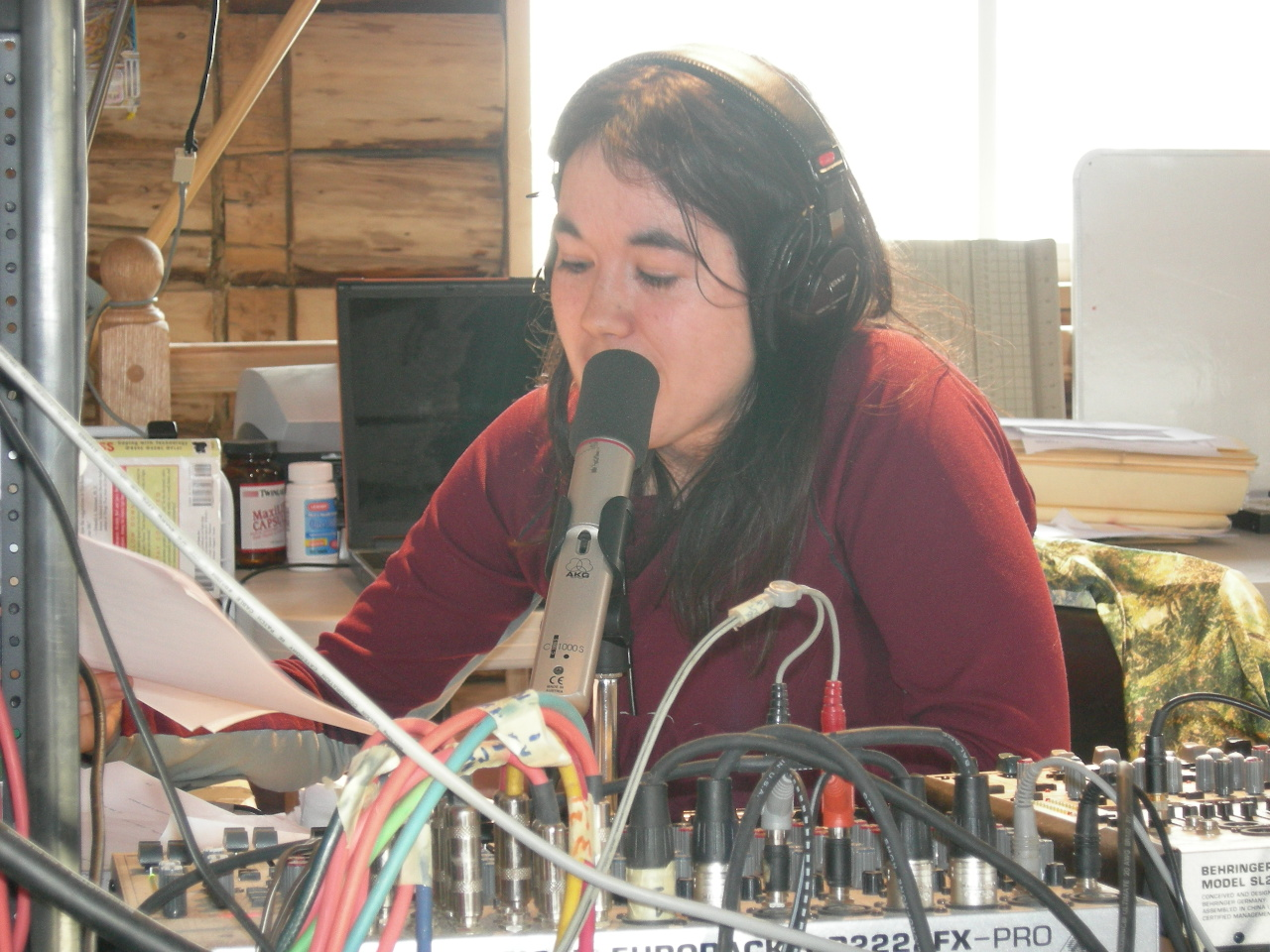
A volunteer reading on-air at Whole Wheat Radio

Whole Wheat Radio Wiki
Interview clip where Jim Kloss discusses wiki and Whole Wheat Radio.

Whole Wheat Radio streamed 56 kbit/s mp3PRO audio using SHOUTcast, which could be accessed from any compatible streaming audio player compatible with the format. Clients without mp3PRO support fell back to an equivalent-quality 128 kbit/s MP3 stream.

A custom install of MediaWiki ran the user-editable music database, the same software that operates Wikipedia, Wiktionary and other Wikimedia Foundation projects. Listeners (affectionately dubbed Wheatheads) were encouraged to add tags, lyrics, art, ratings and other information to song, album and artist pages. The currently-playing song was displayed on the home and chat pages, with links to these resources for more information.

The site accepted regular submissions for logos, which were rotated regularly.

Wheatheads could call in phonegrams that were played automatically on the stream, or leave a comment in the chat system for an EJ to read on air. Text based games (and later, rewards for collaborating on articles) would let Wheatheads accrue "wheatberries", an early form of web gamification.

Separate podcast feeds were available for each of the shows shortly after they had aired live, such as the "Rant-N-Ravin' Muffin News". and house concerts.

== Reception ==
In 2005, Whole Wheat Radio was discussed in an episode of The Dawn and Drew Show, and in an interview with Derek and Swoopy from Skeptic magazine's Skepticality podcast.

Journalist Doc Searls commented in 2004 that "it's an outstanding station. If you miss KPIG's live Webcast, Whole Wheat Radio will ease your surcease. You might think of WWR as folksy or charming (it's both). I think of them as heroic. What they do is the very, very best of what radio is all about."

In an article for PC World, Derek Sivers of CDBaby commented that "online radio is the best way to find new music and [I recommend] indie-flavored Whole Wheat Radio".

== Conclusion ==
In 2010, Jim pushed for a greater emphasis on the site mission of helping independent artists over the chat aspects of the site. This generated animosity, culminating in an unsanctioned, separate Facebook group. Jim closed the site soon after, claiming he no longer loved the job.

The Wheat Palace continued to hold private parties, meetings, classes and art showings through 2011.
