= Stubbs (cat) =

Honorary mayor of Talkeetna, Alaska (1997–2017)

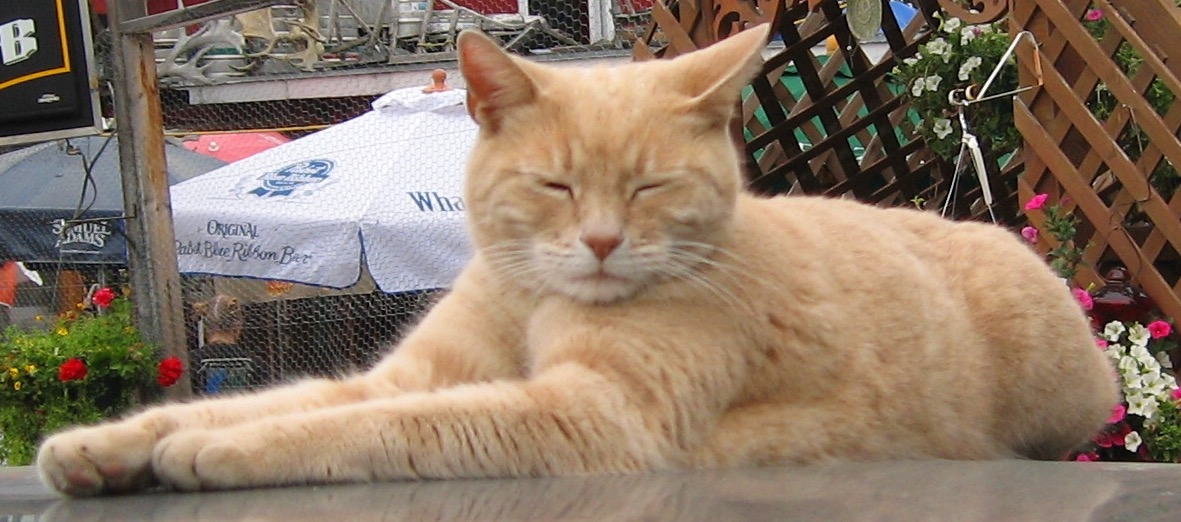
- Stubbs at the West Rib Cafe & Pub in 2006

Honorary Mayor of Talkeetna, Alaska
- In office July 18, 1997 – July 21, 2017

Personal details
- Born: April 12, 1997 Talkeetna, Alaska, U.S.
- Died: July 21, 2017 (aged 20) Talkeetna, Alaska, U.S.

Stubbs (April 12, 1997 – July 21, 2017) was a cat who was the honorary mayor of Talkeetna, Alaska, from July 18, 1997, until his death in 2017. Stubbs was described as a tourist attraction, having been flooded with cards and letters, and drawing 30 to 40 tourists each day who hoped to meet the mayor of Talkeetna. His position was honorary, as the town is only a historic district. Every afternoon, Stubbs went to a nearby restaurant and drank water mixed with catnip out of a wine or margarita glass. Stubbs died in 2017 at the age of 20.

== Early life ==
Stubbs was born on April 12, 1997, in Talkeetna, Alaska. Later in 1997, Lauri Stec, manager of Nagley's General Store, found Stubbs in a box full of kittens in her parking lot. The owners were giving the kittens away; Stec chose "Stubbs" because he did not have a tail.

== Political career ==
Stubbs became the mayor of Talkeetna, Alaska on July 18, 1997. Stubbs was widely described as having been elected after a write-in campaign by voters who opposed the human candidates, but NPR pointed out that this could not have happened because "the tiny town has no real mayor, so there was no election." Nagley's General Store was used as Stubbs's "mayoral office" during his tenure.

Stubbs was featured in an effort to protest the 2014 United States Senate election in Alaska when people urged voters to write Stubbs in on the ballot. Stubbs was featured in a video criticizing both the Democratic and Republican candidates for Senate. One opinion writer for the Alaska Dispatch News insisted that the whole story was false, and that Talkeetna did not have a cat mayor.

=== As a tourist attraction ===
Stubbs was described as a tourist attraction, having been flooded with cards and letters, and drawing 30 to 40 tourists each day (most of whom were en route to other Alaska destinations, such as Denali) who hoped to meet the mayor of Talkeetna. His position was honorary, as the town is only a historic district. Every afternoon, Stubbs went to a nearby restaurant and drank water mixed with catnip out of a wine or margarita glass.

=== Attacks ===
On August 31, 2013, Stubbs was attacked by a dog. He was placed under heavy sedation at a veterinary hospital 70 miles (110 km) away in Wasilla, having suffered a punctured lung, a fractured sternum, and a deep cut in his side. A crowd-funding page was set up to help pay his veterinary bills. Stubbs remained in the veterinary hospital for nine days before returning to the upstairs room of the general store. As a result, he was discouraged from roaming. Donations toward his care were received from around the world; the surplus was given to an animal shelter and to the local veterinary clinic.

Other incidents included Stubbs being shot by teenagers with BB guns, falling into a restaurant's deep fryer (which was switched off and cold at the time), and hitching a ride to the outskirts of Talkeetna on a garbage truck.

== Later life and death ==
In 2015, Stubbs was growing older and thus slowed down his public presence. He died on July 21, 2017. His owners said that "He was a trooper until the end of his life." Stubbs's owners have suggested that another family cat, Denali, may assume Talkeetna's "mayoralty".

== See also ==
- List of individual cats
- Non-human electoral candidates
