= Avalanche Spire =

Mountain in Alaska, United States

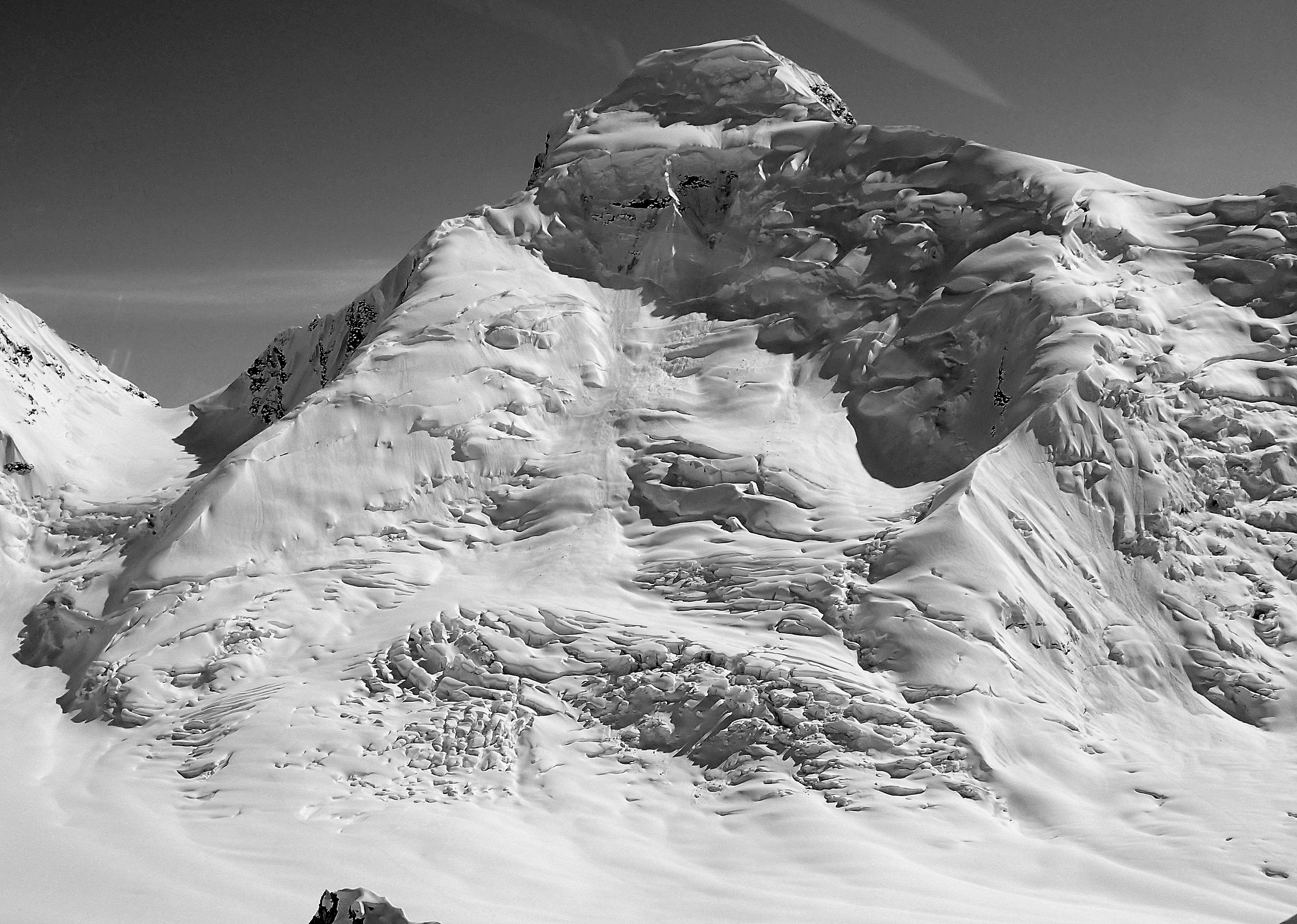
- North aspect

Highest point
- Elevation: 10,105 ft (3,080 m)
- Prominence: 2,655 ft (809 m)
- Isolation: 6.10 mi (9.82 km)
- Coordinates: 62°48′26″N 151°09′01″W

Geography
- Location within Alaska
- Country: United States
- State: Alaska
- Borough: Matanuska-Susitna
- Protected area: Denali National Park
- Parent range: Alaska Range
- Topo map: USGS Talkeetna D-3

Geology
- Rock type: Granite

Climbing
- First ascent: Margaret Young circa 1965
- Easiest route: Technical Climb

Avalanche Spire is a mountain in the Alaska Range located 18.64 miles (30.00 km) south of Denali. It is very technical due to its steep slopes. The mountain's toponym was officially adopted in 1968 by the United States Board on Geographic Names.

== Climate ==
Based on the Köppen climate classification, Avalanche Spire is located in a tundra climate zone with long, cold, snowy winters, and cool summers. Weather systems are forced upwards by the Alaska Range (orographic lift), causing heavy precipitation in the form of snowfall. Winter temperatures can drop below −10 °F with wind chill factors below −20 °F. This climate supports the Kahiltna Glacier west of the peak and smaller unnamed tributary glaciers surrounding the peak. The months May through June offer the most favorable weather for viewing or climbing.

== Gallery ==
East aspect

== See also ==
- Mountain peaks of Alaska
- Geography of Alaska
