= Fairview Inn =

- U.S. National Register of Historic Places
- U.S. Historic district – Contributing property
- Alaska Heritage Resources Survey
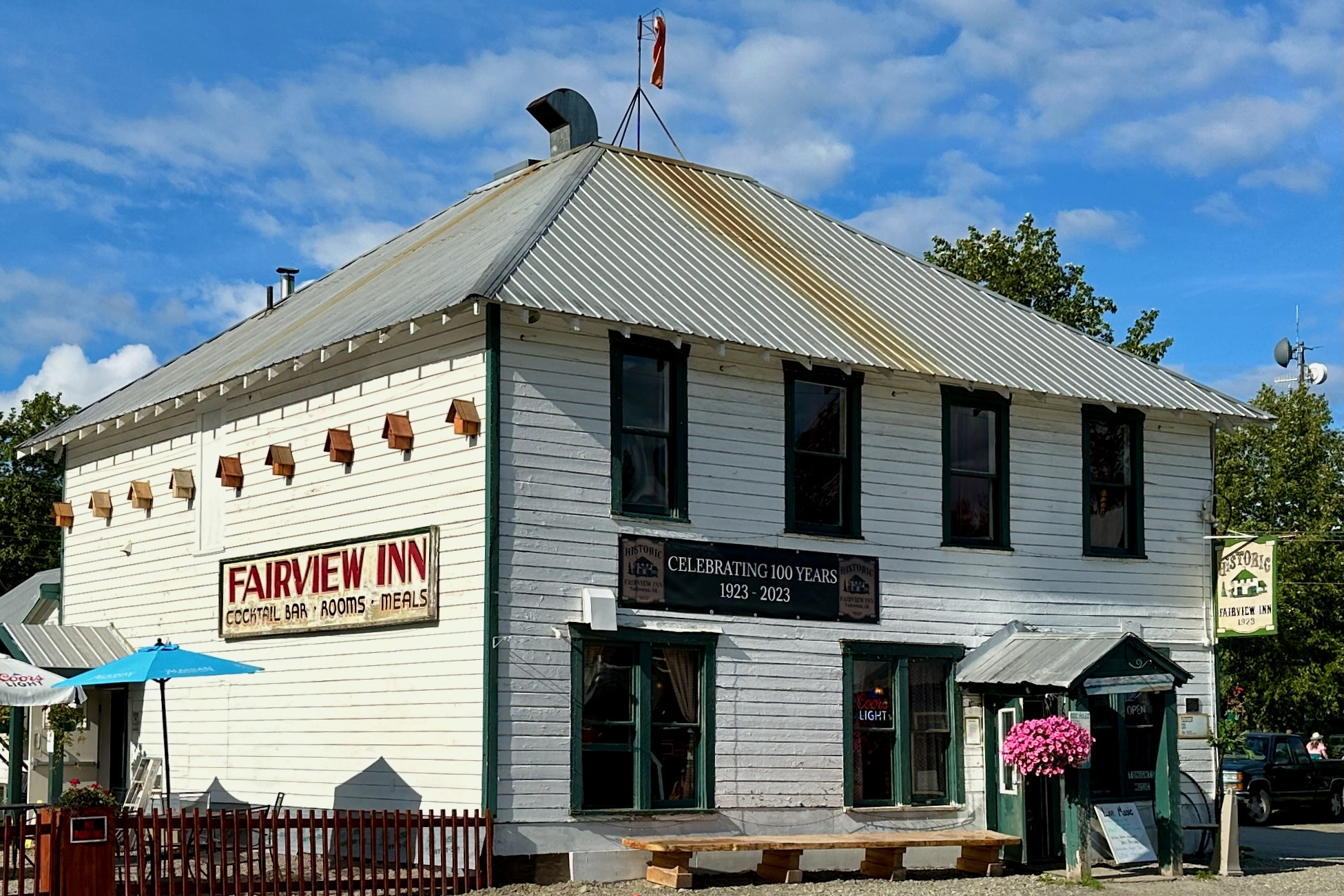
- Celebrating 100 years, 1923–2023

- Location within Alaska
- Location: Main Street, Talkeetna, Alaska
- Coordinates: 62°19′24″N 150°06′48″W
- Area: less than one acre
- Built: 1923
- Part of: Talkeetna Historic District (ID93000321)
- NRHP reference No.: 82004905
- AHRS No.: TAL-006

Significant dates
- Added to NRHP: May 7, 1982
- Designated CP: April 26, 1993
- Designated AHRS: 1970

The Fairview Inn is a historic hotel building on Main Street in the center of Talkeetna, Alaska, United States. It is a two-story frame structure, with a hip roof. The main block, 36 feet (11 m) square, was built between 1920 and 1923, following the arrival in the area of the Alaska Railroad. The building exterior is little-altered since then; its major modification has been the addition in the 1970s of an addition for owner living quarters. The interior also still follows essentially the same floor plan as when it was built.

The building was listed on the National Register of Historic Places in 1982 and was added as a contributing property to Talkeetna Historic District in 1993.

== See also ==
- National Register of Historic Places listings in Matanuska-Susitna Borough, Alaska
