= Talkeetna Roadhouse =

Alaskan frontier roadhouse

Coordinates: 62°19′23″N 150°06′54.7″W

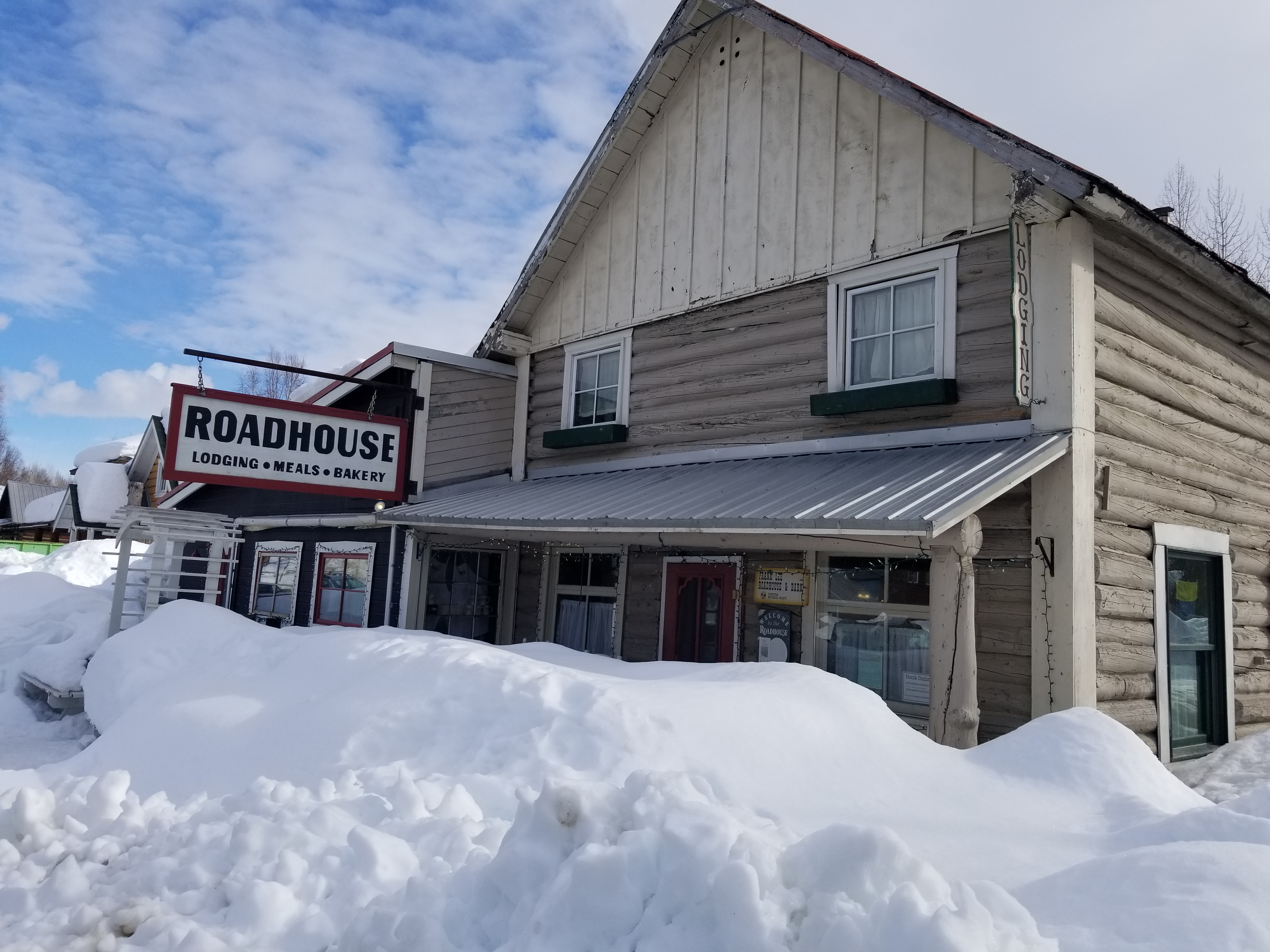
Talkeetna Roadhouse, built of log construction in 1917. As seen in March of 2022.

The Talkeetna Roadhouse is a historically significant Alaskan frontier roadhouse dating from the early 20th century. It is situated in the town of Talkeetna, Alaska in the northern United States.

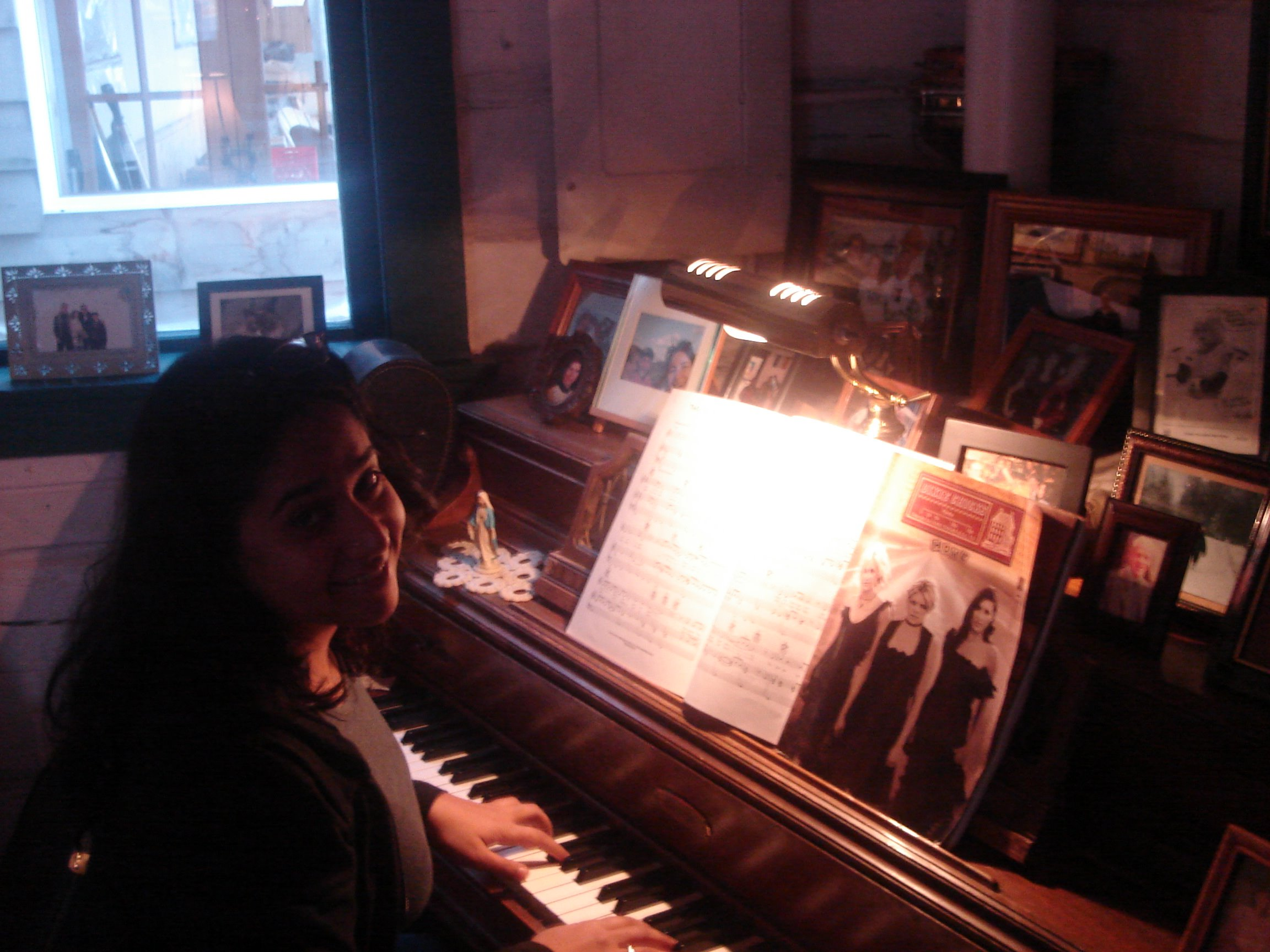
An interior photo of the historic Talkeetna Roadhouse's fireside parlor piano.

Roadhouses served as respites for fur trappers, miners, prospectors, and sojourners making their way through the northern territories of North America in the 19th and 20th centuries. The Talkeetna Roadhouse was one such historically significant roadhouse built in 1917, in Talkeetna, Alaska, and brought into use as a roadhouse later for a variety of travelers as commercial industry continued to expand north through the Territory of Alaska.

Though the Talkeetna Roadhouse is situated in an area known for a significant history of mining, fur trapping, and logging, Talkeetna itself also served as a base of operations for the Alaska Railroad in the 1920s while the railroad was expanded up north to Fairbanks, Alaska. In 1923, U. S. President Warren G. Harding stopped momentarily in Talkeetna while journeying to commemorate the completion of this railroad expansion. The town of Talkeetna now serves as a popular jumping-off point and base camp for forays into nearby Denali National Park. Backpackers, mountain climbers, naturalists, and skiers frequently stay at the Talkeetna Roadhouse before embarking on journeys into the adjacent Denali range.
