= Donald Sheldon =

American pilot (1921–1975)

- Born: November 21, 1921; Mt. Morrison, Colorado
- Died: January 26, 1975 (aged 53)
- Occupation: Pilot
- Spouse: Roberta Reeve
- Children: 3

Donald Edward Sheldon (November 21, 1921 – January 26, 1975) was an Alaskan bush pilot who pioneered the technique of glacier landings on Denali during the 1950s and 1960s.

From his base in Talkeetna, Alaska, Sheldon operated Talkeetna Air Service, which ferried climbers, hunters, fishermen, and others to places inaccessible to ground transportation. Over the years, he assisted in numerous rescue operations, both in civilian and military, and was awarded an Alaska Certificate of Achievement for his help. His planes, which included Piper Super Cubs, Cessna 180s and Aeronca Sedans were equipped with an assortment of landing gear, including skis, floats and large, soft rubber wheels. Sheldon died of cancer in 1975.

== Bibliography ==
- Greiner, James. (1974). Wager with the Wind: The Don Sheldon Story. New York: St. Martin's Press. ISBN 0-312-85337-8
- Mason, Mort (2002). Flying the Alaska Wild. Stillwater, Minnesota: Voyageur Press. ISBN 0-89658-589-1.

== Additional sources ==
- Phinizy, Coles (February 14, 1972). "Off Into The Wild White Yonder." Sports Illustrated. Accessed July 2012.
