= Dittman =

Dittman is a surname. Notable people with the surname include:

- Bernie Dittman (1927–2006), owner, president, and general manager of radio station WABB
- Earl Dittman (born c. 1960), owner and film critic for Wireless Magazines
- Henry Dittman (born 1971), American voice actor/actor
- Kevin C. Dittman (born 1960), American computer scientist
- Lori Dittman, American politician
- Mick Dittman (born 1952), Australian jockey

== See also ==
- Dittmar
