= Talkeetna Airport =

Airport in Talkeetna, Alaska, United States

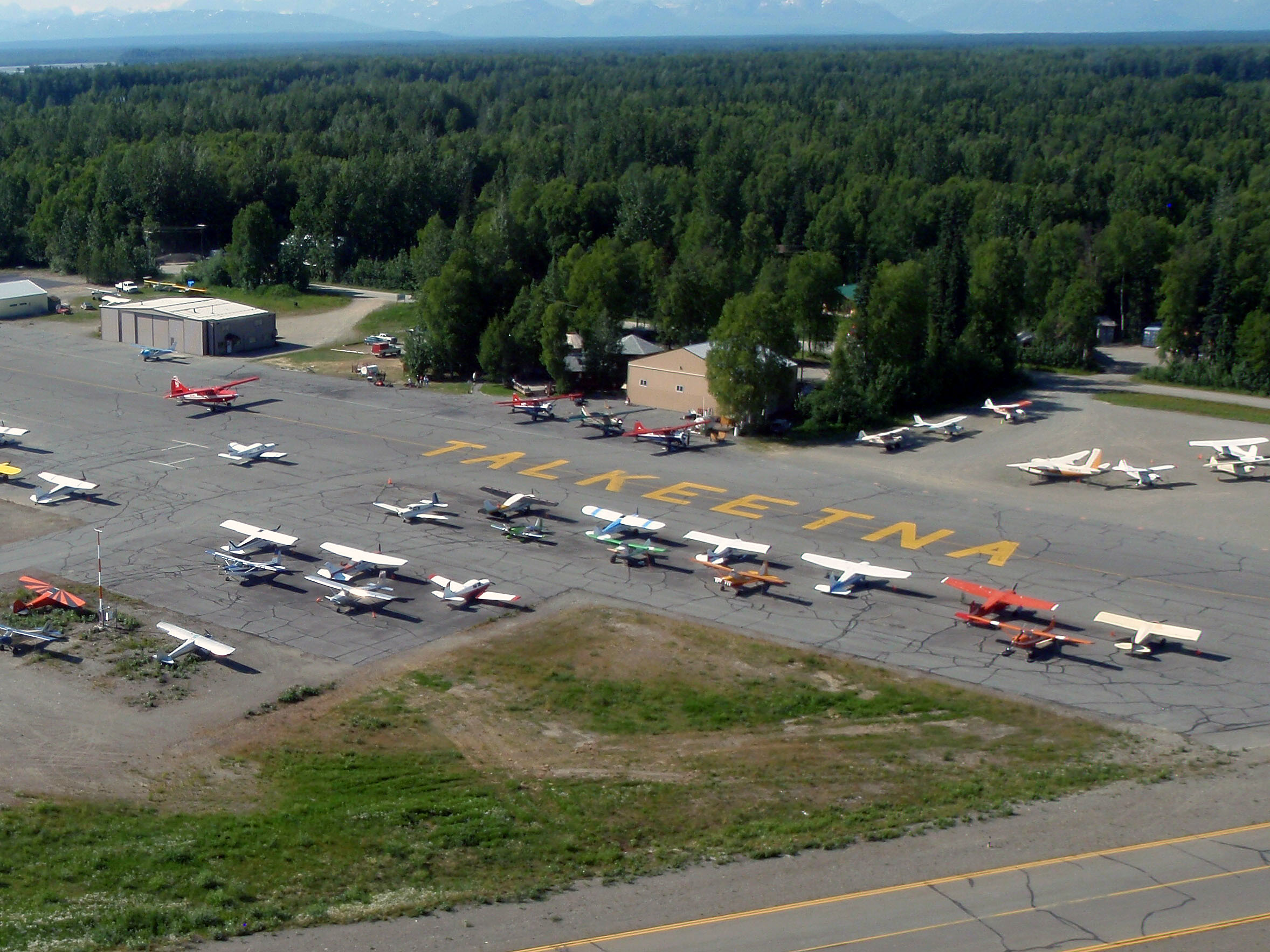
- Talkeetna Airport in 2011
- IATA: TKA; ICAO: PATK; FAA LID: TKA; WMO: 70251

Summary
- Airport type: Public
- Owner: State of Alaska DOT&PF - Central Region
- Serves: Talkeetna, Alaska
- Elevation AMSL: 358 ft / 109 m
- Coordinates: 62°19′14″N 150°05′37″W

Map
- Location of airport in Alaska

Runways
Direction	Length		Surface
Direction	ft	m	Surface
1/19	3,500	1,067	Asphalt

Helipads
Number	Length		Surface
Number	ft	m	Surface
H1	480	146	Gravel

Statistics (2009)
- Aircraft operations: 30,000
- Based aircraft: 25
- Source: Federal Aviation Administration

Talkeetna Airport (IATA: TKA, ICAO: PATK, FAA LID: TKA) is a state-owned public-use airport located one nautical mile (1.9 km) east of the central business district of Talkeetna, in the Matanuska-Susitna Borough of the U.S. state of Alaska.

This airport is included in the National Plan of Integrated Airport Systems for 2011–2015, which categorized it as a general aviation airport. As per Federal Aviation Administration records, the airport had 1,150 passenger boardings in calendar year 2008.

The airport is home to at least seven air taxi operations, and is busy during tourist season because of its proximity to Denali. Air services operating from the airport include Sheldon Air Service, Talkeetna Aero Services, K2 Aviation, and Talkeetna Air Taxi.

== Facilities and aircraft ==
Talkeetna Airport covers an area of 624 acres (253 ha) at an elevation of 358 feet (109 m) above mean sea level. Its one runway is designated 1/19 and has an asphalt pavement measuring 3,500 by 75 feet (1,067 by 23 m). It also has one helipad designated H1 with a gravel surface measuring 480 by 85 feet (146 by 26 m).

For the 12-month period ending December 31, 2009, the airport had 30,000 aircraft operations, an average of 82 per day: 67% general aviation, 32% air taxi, and 2% military. At that time there were 25 aircraft based at this airport: 96% single-engine, and 4% multi-engine.

=== Historical airline service ===
Alaska Airlines served Talkeetna from the mid 1950s to the early 1960s on a flag stop basis via a local route between Anchorage and Fairbanks with prop aircraft such as the Douglas DC-3 and the Curtiss C-46. In 1978, Great Northern Airlines, a regional air carrier, was operating six nonstop flights a week to Ted Stevens Anchorage International Airport as well as a direct one stop flight to Fairbanks International Airport also operated six days a week via a stop at McKinley National Park Airport with both services being flown with Piper Chieftain twin prop aircraft. By 1999 Grant Aviation, a commuter air carrier, served Talkeetna with six roundtrip nonstop flights a week to Ted Stevens Anchorage International Airport operated with a Beechcraft Super King Air twin turboprop aircraft. The airport currently does not have any scheduled passenger air service; however, charter flights are available.

== Incidents ==
In February 2023, a U.S. Army AH-64 Apache based at Fort Wainwright in Fairbanks, Alaska crashed at the airport. Both crew members were injured in the crash.

== See also ==
- List of airports in Alaska
