= Talkeetna, Alaska =

Talkeetna, Alaska K'dalkitnu
- Census-designated place
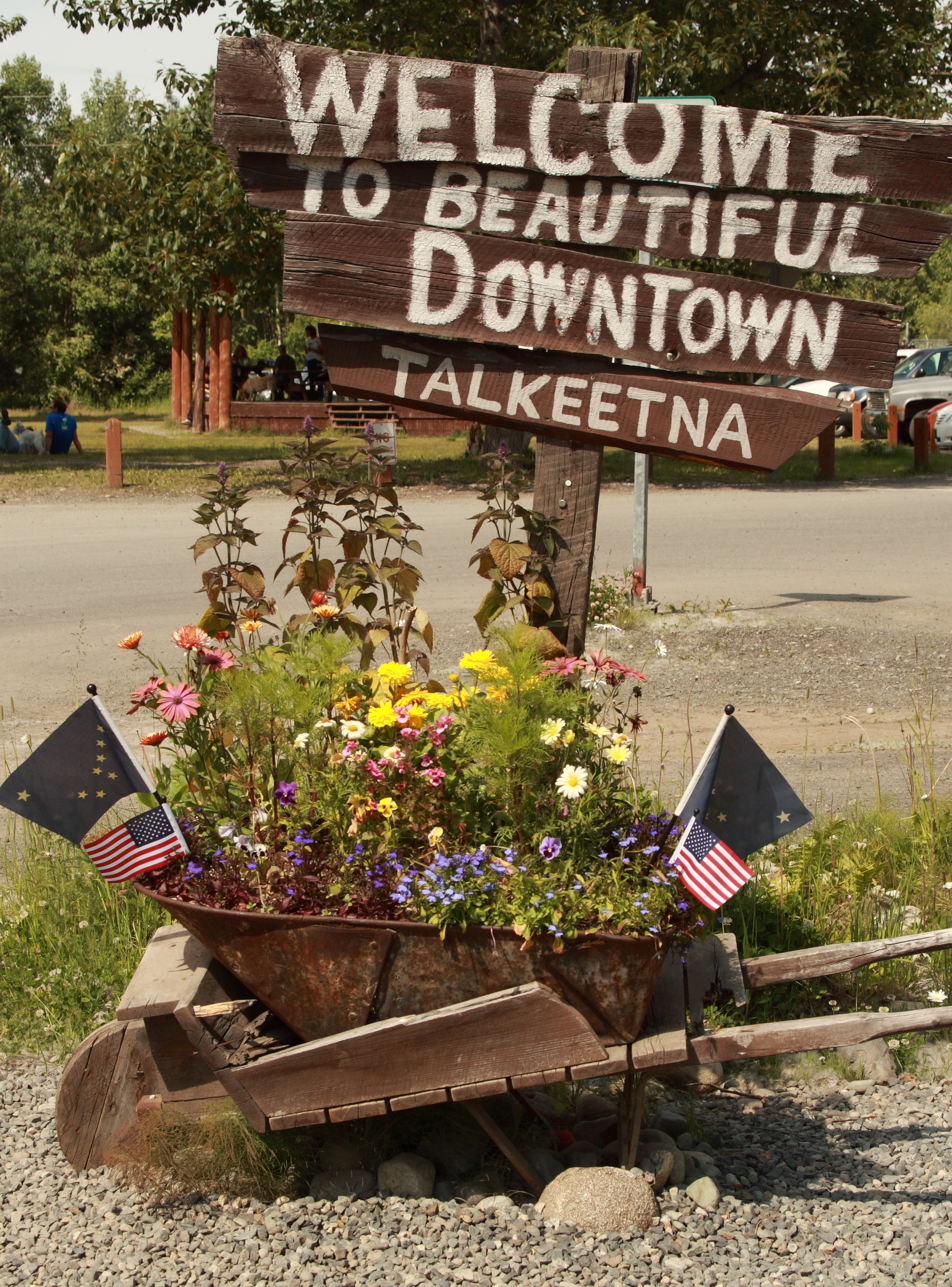
- Welcome Sign in downtown Talkeetna

- Location in Matanuska-Susitna Borough and the state of Alaska

- Location within the state of Alaska
- Coordinates: 62°19′26″N 150°06′34″W
- Country: United States
- State: Alaska
- Borough: Matanuska-Susitna

Government
  - Borough mayor: Edna DeVries (R)
  - State senator: Mike Shower (R)
  - State rep.: Kevin McCabe (R)

Area
  - Total: 96.35 sq mi (249.54 km^{2})
  - Land: 94.22 sq mi (244.02 km^{2})
  - Water: 2.13 sq mi (5.52 km^{2})
- Elevation: 348 ft (106 m)

Population (2020)
  - Total: 1,055
  - Density: 11.2/sq mi (4.32/km^{2})
- Time zone: UTC−9 (Alaska (AKST))
  - Summer (DST): UTC−8 (AKDT)
- ZIP code: 99676
- Area code: 907
- FIPS code: 02-74830
- GNIS feature ID: 1410591

Talkeetna (Dena'ina: K'dalkitnu) is a census-designated place (CDP) in Matanuska-Susitna Borough, Alaska, United States. At the 2020 census the entire CDP's population was 1,055, up from 876 in 2010.

== Geography ==
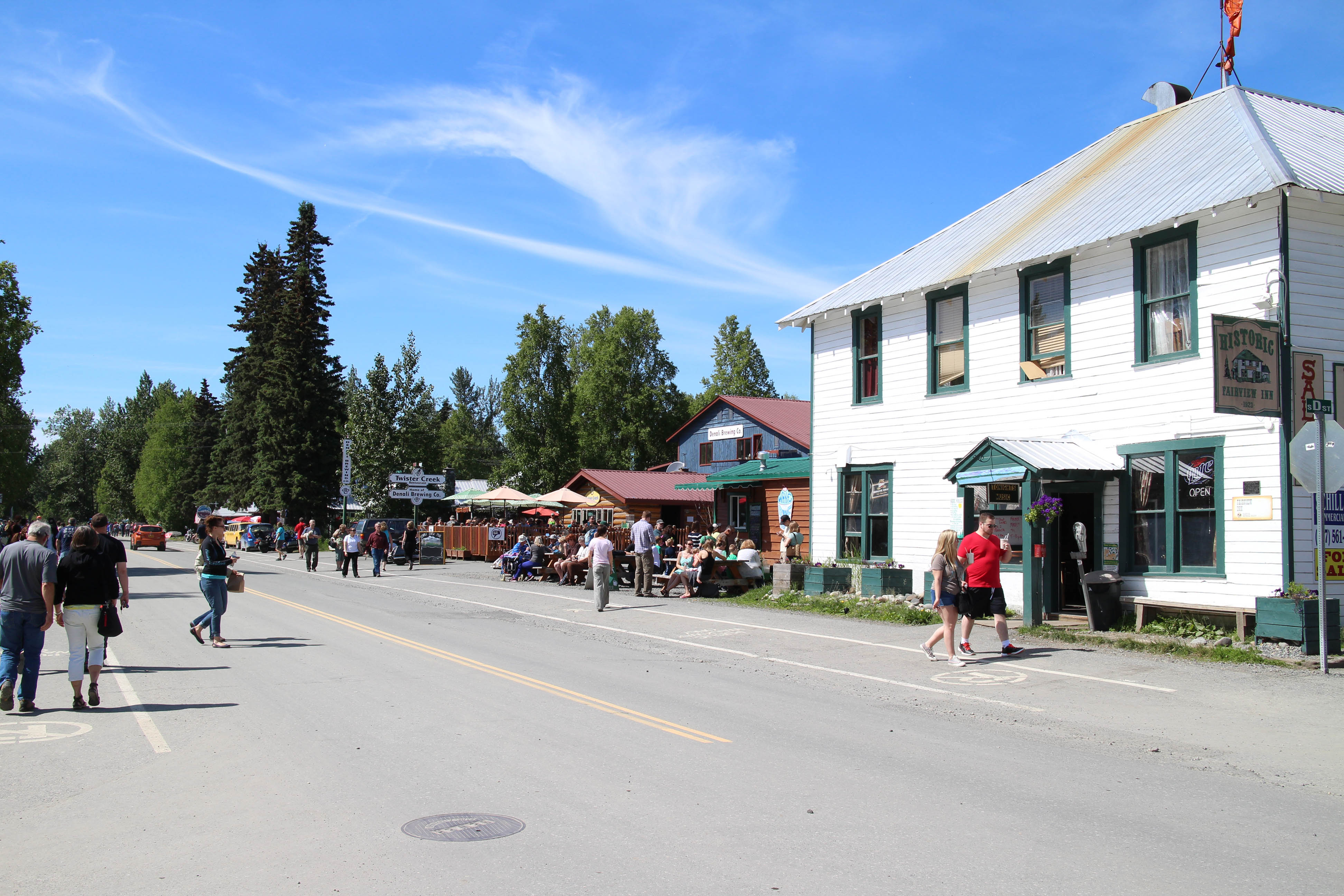
Tourists on Main Street in Talkeetna, Alaska, in June 2015

Talkeetna is at the confluence of three rivers, the Susitna, Chulitna, and Talkeetna. Talkeetna began in 1916 when the area was chosen as a district headquarters for the Alaska Railroad. A post office opened as well as a sawmill, trading post, cigar and donkey store, and other businesses, as well as many cabins. In 1917, the residents encouraged the government to survey the lots on which their homes stood. In 1919, the railroad surveyed and auctioned 80 lots, 41 of which already had permanent structures on them. The average price at the sale was $14.25.

Flightseeing, rafting, mountain biking, homestead tours, hiking, camping, fishing, and hunting make up a large portion of the local economy. Talkeetna is a 2 hour drive from Anchorage. The core downtown area (Talkeetna Historic District) is on the register of National Historic Places, with buildings dating from the early 1900s, including Nagley's General Store, Fairview Inn, and the Talkeetna Roadhouse.

According to the United States Census Bureau, the CDP has an area of 42.9 square miles (111 km^{2}), of which 41.6 square miles (108 km^{2}) is land and 1.4 square miles (3.6 km^{2}) (3.19%) is water.

=== Climate ===
Climate chart for Talkeetna

The climate is continental subarctic (Köppen: Dfc), but the short warm season and long winters give the town boreal features and in terms of vegetation is composed of taiga (Cook Inlet Basin). Even though the cold, dry air comes from the north, the moisture acquired comes from the Gulf of Alaska. That is, summers are of between short and average length. It is lighter than Yellowknife, Canada at similar latitudes due to the moderating effect of the Pacific Ocean and the adiabatic warming of the descending air from the surrounding mountains. The average annual temperature is 0.8 °C. The average precipitation is not as high but relatively well distributed during the year, about 686 mm on average.

Climate data for Talkeetna Airport, Alaska (1991–2020 normals, (Note: Mean monthly maxima and minima (i.e., the highest and lowest temperature readings during an entire month or year) calculated based on data at said location from 1991 to 2020.) extremes 1918–present)
Month	Jan	Feb	Mar	Apr	May	Jun	Jul	Aug	Sep	Oct	Nov	Dec	Year
Record high °F (°C)	47 (8)	52 (11)	55 (13)	77 (25)	87 (31)	96 (36)	93 (34)	89 (32)	78 (26)	68 (20)	52 (11)	49 (9)	96 (36)
Mean maximum °F (°C)	39.4 (4.1)	41.9 (5.5)	48.5 (9.2)	58.6 (14.8)	74.4 (23.6)	81.5 (27.5)	81.6 (27.6)	77.3 (25.2)	67.5 (19.7)	55.9 (13.3)	41.6 (5.3)	39.6 (4.2)	84.3 (29.1)
Mean daily maximum °F (°C)	21.8 (−5.7)	28.2 (−2.1)	34.6 (1.4)	46.6 (8.1)	58.7 (14.8)	67.1 (19.5)	68.7 (20.4)	65.1 (18.4)	56.0 (13.3)	41.8 (5.4)	27.9 (−2.3)	23.4 (−4.8)	45.0 (7.2)
Daily mean °F (°C)	13.6 (−10.2)	18.8 (−7.3)	23.5 (−4.7)	36.2 (2.3)	47.7 (8.7)	57.0 (13.9)	60.1 (15.6)	56.5 (13.6)	47.5 (8.6)	34.2 (1.2)	20.6 (−6.3)	15.6 (−9.1)	35.9 (2.2)
Mean daily minimum °F (°C)	5.4 (−14.8)	9.4 (−12.6)	12.4 (−10.9)	25.8 (−3.4)	36.7 (2.6)	47.0 (8.3)	51.4 (10.8)	47.9 (8.8)	39.0 (3.9)	26.5 (−3.1)	13.2 (−10.4)	7.8 (−13.4)	26.9 (−2.8)
Mean minimum °F (°C)	−23.7 (−30.9)	−17.1 (−27.3)	−11.7 (−24.3)	8.9 (−12.8)	26.7 (−2.9)	37.0 (2.8)	43.3 (6.3)	37.1 (2.8)	26.0 (−3.3)	8.9 (−12.8)	−9.9 (−23.3)	−19.1 (−28.4)	−28.2 (−33.4)
Record low °F (°C)	−48 (−44)	−46 (−43)	−43 (−42)	−37 (−38)	8 (−13)	24 (−4)	26 (−3)	25 (−4)	11 (−12)	−21 (−29)	−41 (−41)	−53 (−47)	−53 (−47)
Average precipitation inches (mm)	1.34 (34)	1.24 (31)	1.08 (27)	1.32 (34)	1.56 (40)	1.71 (43)	2.87 (73)	4.70 (119)	4.48 (114)	2.78 (71)	1.77 (45)	1.66 (42)	26.51 (673)
Average snowfall inches (cm)	22.3 (57)	22.1 (56)	15.0 (38)	7.7 (20)	1.0 (2.5)	0.0 (0.0)	0.0 (0.0)	0.0 (0.0)	0.7 (1.8)	13.3 (34)	23.3 (59)	31.7 (81)	137.1 (348)
Average precipitation days (≥ 0.01 inch)	9.4	9.1	8.1	8.2	11.0	12.4	14.5	16.8	16.4	12.5	9.9	11.3	139.6
Average snowy days (≥ 0.1 inch)	10.3	9.5	8.0	3.8	0.5	0.0	0.0	0.0	0.5	5.6	11.6	13.0	62.8
Average relative humidity (%)	72.2	72.6	70.2	69.6	66.8	71.0	75.9	79.6	81.2	80.9	76.1	73.0	74.1
Average dew point °F (°C)	5.2 (−14.9)	9.9 (−12.3)	14.7 (−9.6)	24.1 (−4.4)	33.3 (0.7)	44.1 (6.7)	50.2 (10.1)	47.8 (8.8)	39.7 (4.3)	27.0 (−2.8)	11.5 (−11.4)	3.9 (−15.6)	26.0 (−3.4)
Source: NOAA (relative humidity and dew point 1961-1990, average snowfall/snow days 1981–2010)

== Demographics ==
Historical population
Census	Pop.	Note	%±
1920	70		—
1930	89		27.1%
1940	136		52.8%
1950	106		−22.1%
1960	76		−28.3%
1970	182		139.5%
1980	264		45.1%
1990	250		−5.3%
2000	772		208.8%
2010	876		13.5%
2020	1,055		20.4%
U.S. Decennial Census

Talkeetna originally appeared on the U.S. Census as a discrete village in 1920. Its population was included by the Census Bureau within the much larger census-designated place (CDP) after 1990.

=== 2020 census ===
As of the 2020 census, Talkeetna had a population of 1,055 for the entire CDP (not just the village proper). The median age was 50.2 years. 15.1% of residents were under the age of 18 and 25.8% of residents were 65 years of age or older. For every 100 females there were 115.7 males, and for every 100 females age 18 and over there were 115.4 males age 18 and over.

0.0% of residents lived in urban areas, while 100.0% lived in rural areas.

There were 522 households in Talkeetna, of which 17.4% had children under the age of 18 living in them. Of all households, 43.7% were married-couple households, 28.4% were households with a male householder and no spouse or partner present, and 19.0% were households with a female householder and no spouse or partner present. About 37.5% of all households were made up of individuals and 11.5% had someone living alone who was 65 years of age or older.

There were 998 housing units, of which 47.7% were vacant. The homeowner vacancy rate was 2.2% and the rental vacancy rate was 27.6%.

Racial composition as of the 2020 census
Race	Number	Percent
White	925	87.7%
Black or African American	3	0.3%
American Indian and Alaska Native	10	0.9%
Asian	13	1.2%
Native Hawaiian and Other Pacific Islander	0	0.0%
Some other race	14	1.3%
Two or more races	90	8.5%
Hispanic or Latino (of any race)	18	1.7%

=== 2000 census ===
As of the census of 2000, there were 772 people, 358 households, and 181 families residing in the CDP. The population density was 18.6 inhabitants per square mile (7.2/km^{2}). There were 528 housing units at an average density of 12.7 per square mile (4.9/km^{2}). The racial makeup of the CDP was 87.95% White, 3.76% Native American, 0.13% Asian, 1.30% from African American, and 6.87% from two or more races. 1.04% of the population were Hispanic or Latino of any race.

There were 358 households, out of which 28.2% had children under the age of 18 living with them, 38.0% were married couples living together, 7.3% had a female householder with no husband present, and 49.4% were non-families. Thirty-eight percent of all households were made up of individuals, and 6.7% had someone living alone who was 65 years of age or older. The average household size was 2.16 and the average family size was 2.92.

In the CDP, the population was spread out, with 23.3% under the age of 18, 5.8% from 18 to 24, 35.4% from 25 to 44, 29.4% from 45 to 64, and 6.1% who were 65 years of age or older. The median age was 39 years. For every 100 females, there were 113.3 males. For every 100 females age 18 and over, there were 114.5 males.

The median income for a household in the CDP was $38,289, and the median income for a family was $46,818. Males had a median income of $34,732 versus $26,250 for females. The per capita income for the CDP was $23,695. About 7.2% of families and 10.8% of the population were below the poverty line, including 8.8% of those under age 18 and none of those age 65 or over.

== Economy ==
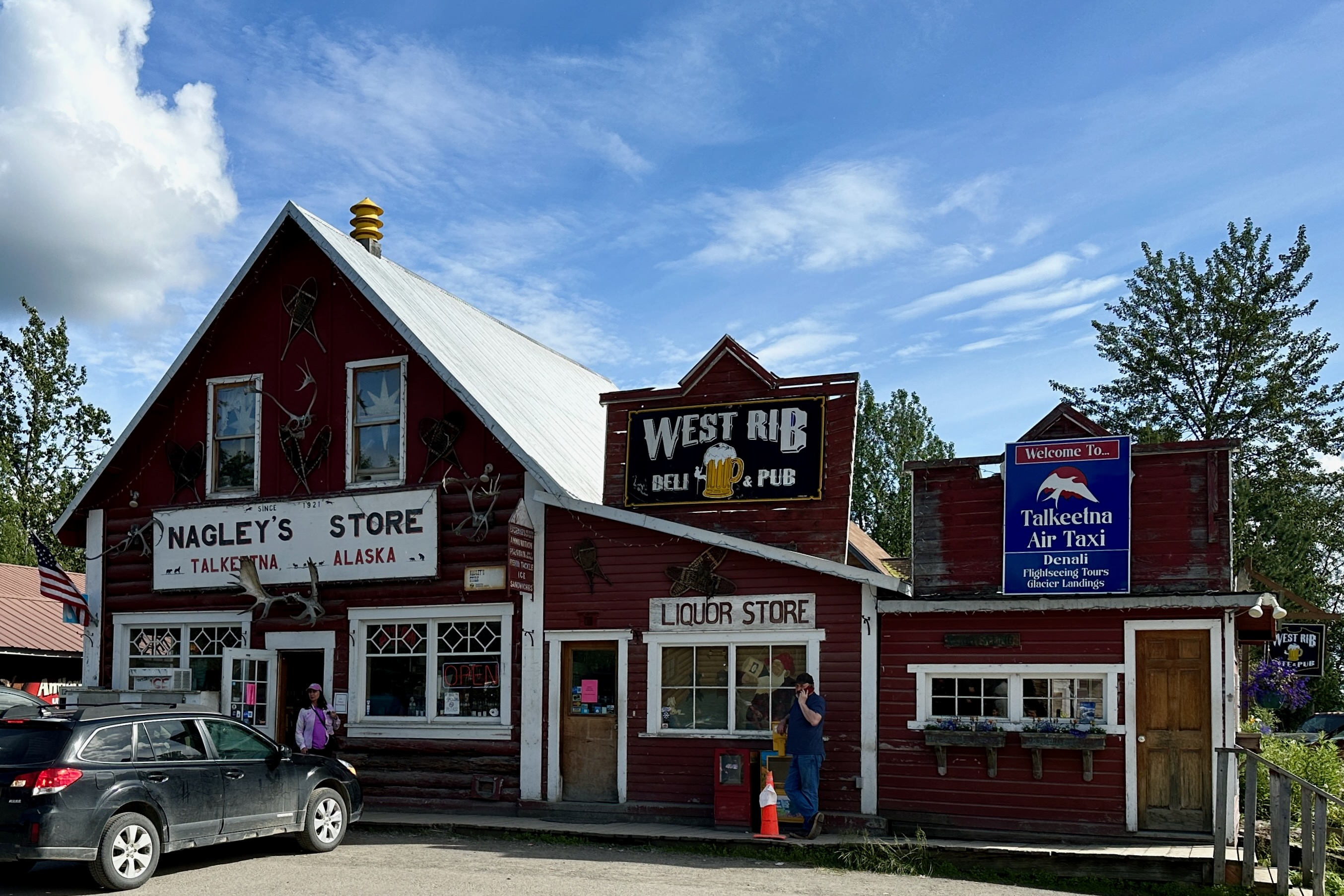
Nagley's Store. The Nagley family are pioneer residents of Talkeetna. They were also partners in the Westward Hotel in Anchorage, a predecessor to today's Hilton Anchorage Hotel.

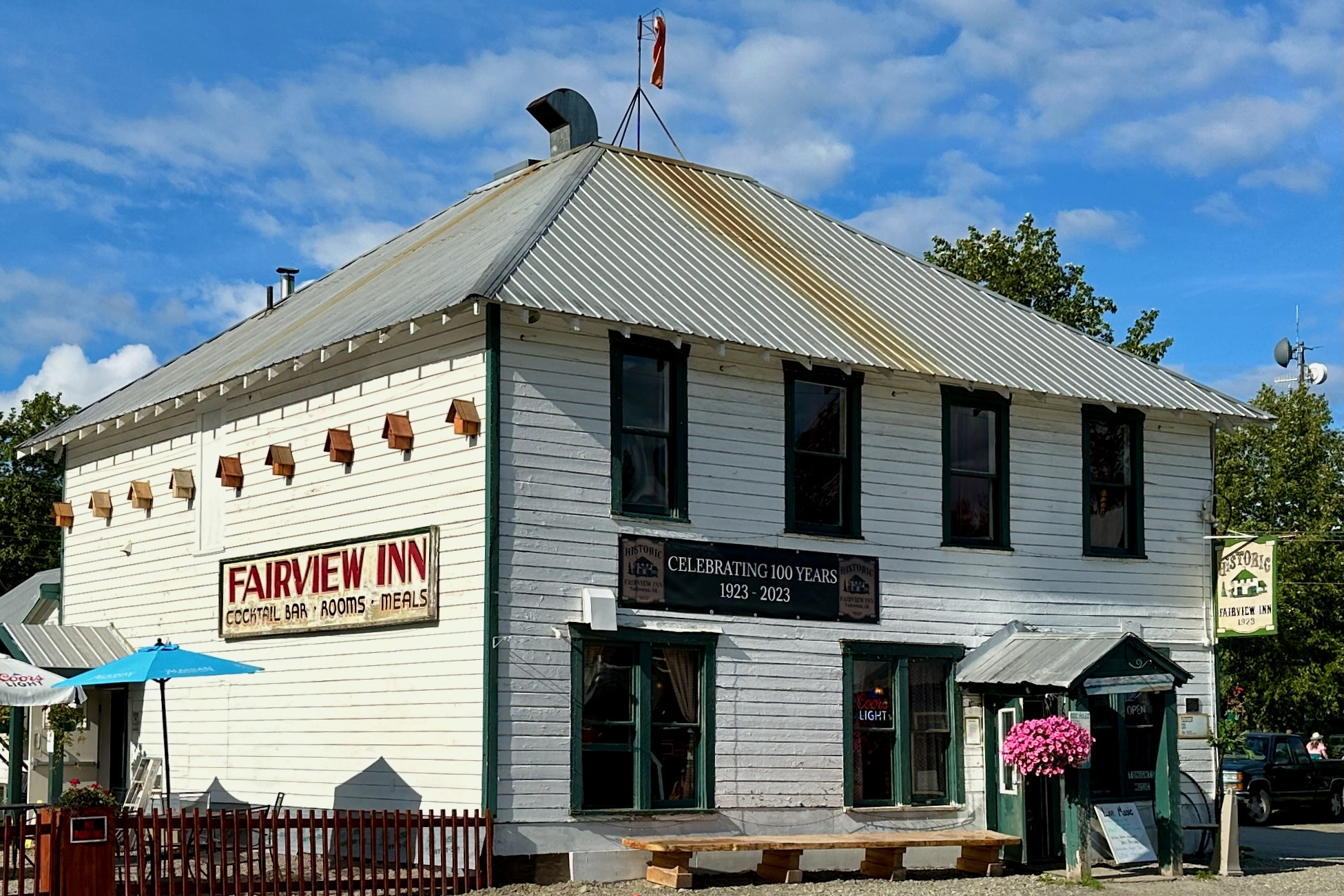
Fairview Inn, built in 1923

Talkeetna is the base for expeditions to Denali. The Denali National Park's Walter Harper Talkeetna Ranger Station is in Talkeetna. Tourists travel to Talkeetna each summer to fish salmon, raft and go flightseeing. Products by local artists, musicians, and craftspeople are available in area stores.

=== Susitna Dam ===
The Susitna Dam is a proposed hydroelectricity plan by the State of Alaska. On July 25, 2011, the Governor of Alaska signed a bill to construct the dam on the glacier-fed Susitna River. The dam, if built to its full design height, would be the fifth-tallest of the nearly 850,000 dams on Earth. The Susitna River, America's 15th-largest by volume, flows unimpeded for 300 miles (480 km) from glacial mountains through one of the planet's last wild landscapes to meet the Pacific near Anchorage.

Soon after the dam's construction was announced, the Susitna River Coalition was formed to fight its construction. The SRC argues that recreation, ecology, local economies, and infrastructure would be severely threatened by the dam. Additionally, opponents of the project highlight concerns that the Susitna Hydroelectric Project would compound on existing pressures to local salmon runs already suffering from bycatch and warming ocean temperatures.

== Events ==
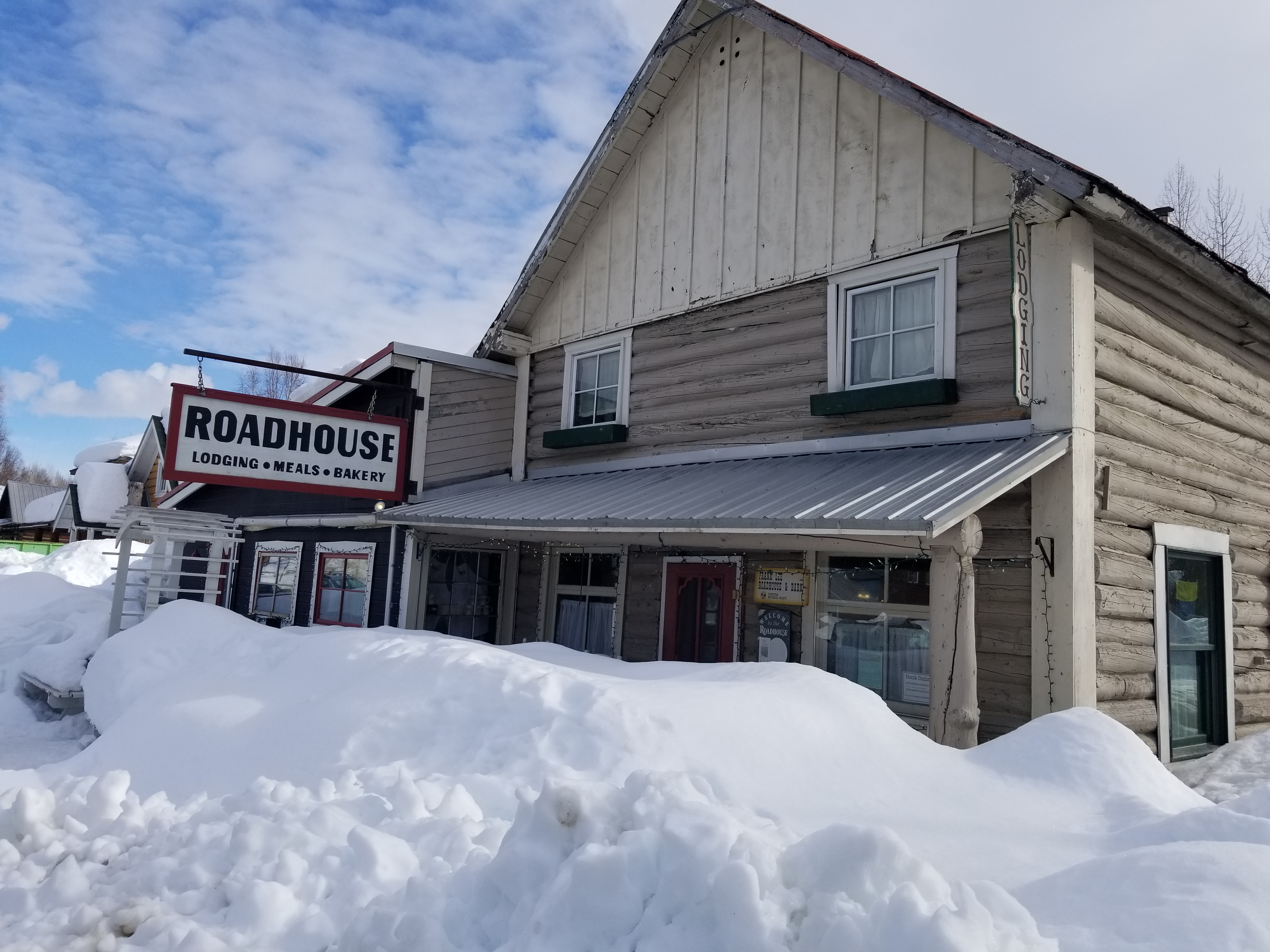
Talkeetna Roadhouse, made of log construction in 1917, features an inn, bakery, and restaurant.

Every March, the Oosik Classic Ski Race is organized by the Denali Nordic Ski Club. Distances are approximate and trail conditions are variable.

The Moose Dropping Festival, a two-day celebration held each July to raise funds for the Talkeetna Historical Society, ended with the organization's announcement on August 21, 2009, that it had been canceled. The 2009 event drew record crowds, resulting in multiple arrests and injuries and one death. The event was named after a lottery in which participants bet on numbered, varnished pieces of moose feces, or "moose droppings", dropped from a helicopter onto a target.

In December, the Wilderness Woman and Bachelor Auction & Ball takes place.

Talkeetna's largest celebration of winter, Winterfest, takes place in December and features a motorized Parade of Lights, a Christmas tree in the Village Park, a Taste of Talkeetna, numerous special events hosted by local businesses, and special events at Talkeetna Public Library.

Clothing company Carhartt sponsors an event in Talkeetna every winter. Attendees tell stories about the mechanical, animal, and other encounters their Carhartt clothes have survived.

== Government ==
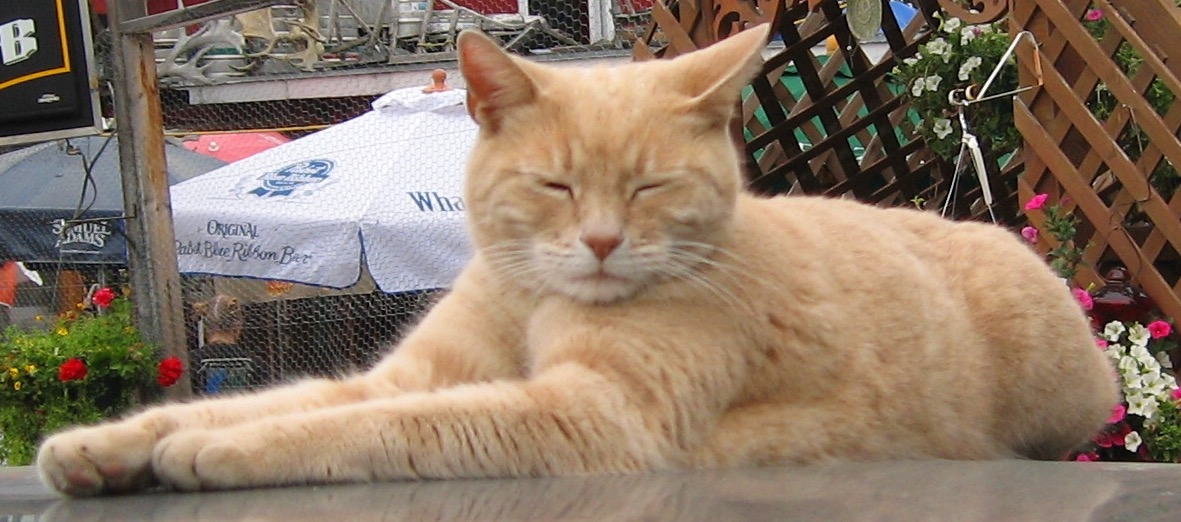
Stubbs, Honorary "Mayor", held office from 1997 to 2017.

Since Talkeetna is only a census-designated place, it is unincorporated. Talkeetna has a Community Council and its mayor was a cat named Stubbs from 1997 until his death in 2017. It is in Matanuska-Susitna Borough's District 7, which is represented by Assembly Member Vern Halter, who succeeded borough mayor Larry DeVilbiss.

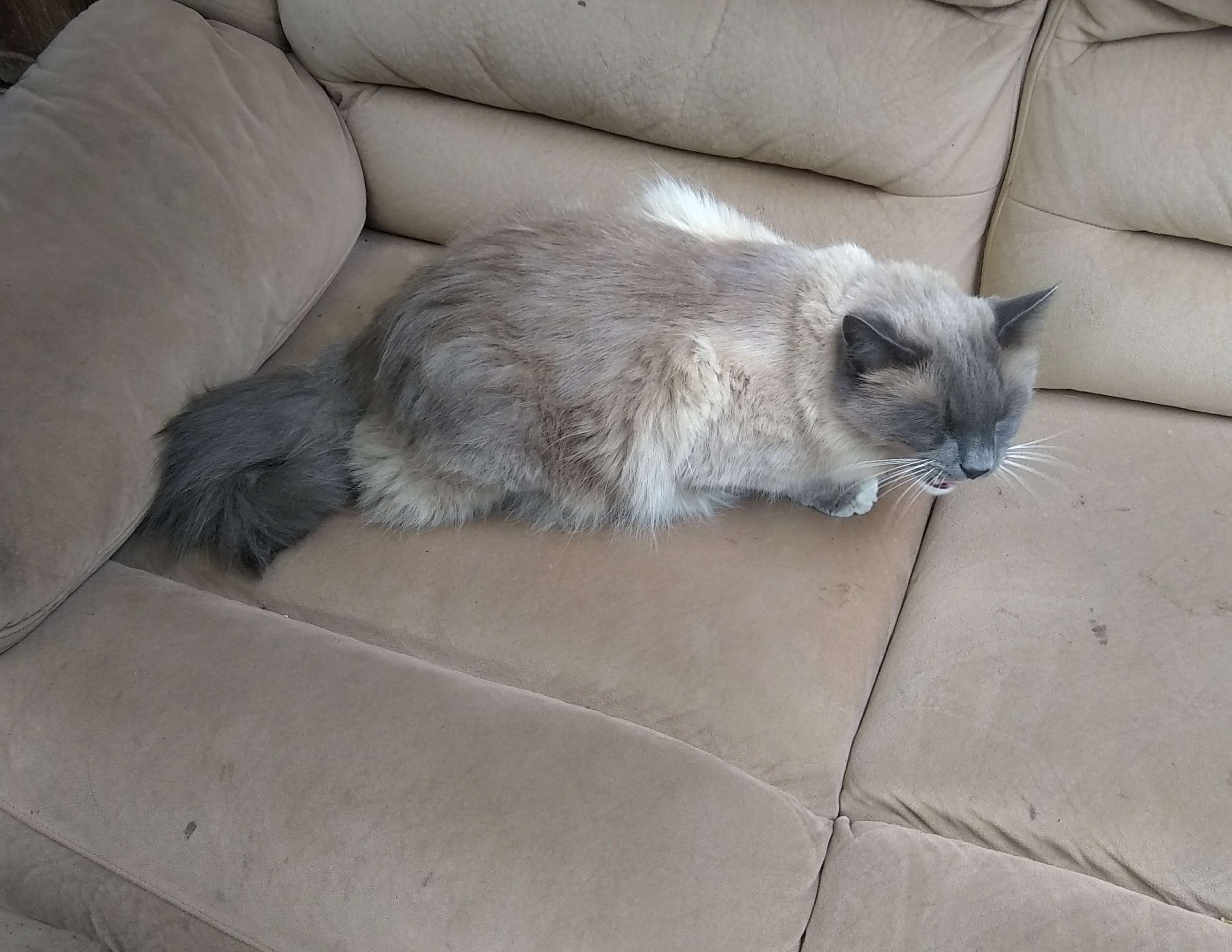
Aurora, Honorary "Mayor", elected in 2017

A popular rumor is that Stubbs was elected by a write-in campaign by voters who opposed the human candidates. But according to NPR, the cat could not have been elected as a write-in candidate because "The tiny town has no real mayor, so there was no election". Stubbs's position was honorary as the town is unincorporated. On August 31, 2013, Stubbs was attacked and mauled by a dog while roaming the streets and, after treatment by a veterinarian, returned home on September 9. He died on July 21, 2017, at the age of 20 years and 3 months. Since then, a cat named Aurora has been the unofficial mayor.

=== Legislative representation ===
The following individuals have represented Talkeetna in the Alaska Legislature since statehood:

Representation in the Alaska Senate

- District E (1959–1967) – two-member, at-large district for the Third Division, which consisted of nearly all of Southcentral Alaska and most of Southwest Alaska
  - Ralph E. Moody, D-Anchorage (1959–1960; resigned to accept appointment as attorney general, seat left unfilled until start of next legislature)
  - Irene E. Ryan, D-Anchorage (1959–1961)
  - Vance Phillips, R-Anchorage (1961–1965)
  - Howard W. Pollock, R-Anchorage (1961–1963, 1965–1967)
  - Nicholas J. Begich, D-Fort Richardson and Spenard (1963–1967)
- District G (1959–1967) – single-member district which covered an area coterminous with the present-day Municipality of Anchorage and Matanuska-Susitna Borough
  - J. Earl Cooper, D-Anchorage (1959; resigned to accept appointment to judgeship)
  - Seaborn J. Buckalew, Jr., D-Anchorage (1960–1961; appointed to replace Cooper)
  - Brad Phillips, R-Anchorage (1961–1967)

The area-based apportionment scheme, established in the Alaska Constitution, was abolished following the decision of the U.S. Supreme Court in Reynolds v. Sims, affirmed by the Alaska Supreme Court in its decision in Nolan v. Wade. Both houses of the legislature were apportioned based strictly on population from this point forward.

- District D (1967–1983)
  - Jan M. Koslosky, R-Palmer (1967–1973)
  - Jalmar M. Kerttula, D-Palmer (1973–1983)
- District I (1983–1985) – represented by Jalmar M. Kerttula throughout its existence
- District E (1985–1993) – the previous District I, coterminous with both the MSB and the two-member House District 16, was changed due to further redistricting ordered through the decision in Carpenter v. Hammond. The new district was a two-member district, with designated seats A and B, and combined the MSB with portions of Anchorage and the Kenai Peninsula Borough. This "donut district", which encircled most of Anchorage, was ruled improper in a later court case, No further redistricting was ordered, however, due to the fact that this decision was reached approximately 2 years before the start of the next redistricting cycle.
  - District E, Seat A
    - Jalmar M. Kerttula (1985–1993)
  - District E, Seat B
    - Edna B. DeVries, R-Palmer (1985–1987)
    - Mike Szymanski, D-Anchorage (1987–1991)
    - Curt Menard, D-Wasilla (1991–1993)

Subsequent redistrictings created 40 House districts and 20 Senate districts. This was included with the redistricting amendments to the Alaska Constitution ratified by voters in 1998, which means that future redistricting boards are compelled to follow the same scheme.

- District N (1993–2003)
  - Jalmar M. Kerttula (1993–1995, lost reelection)
  - Lyda Green, R-Wasilla (1995–2003)
- District H (2003–2013)
  - Scott Ogan, R-Palmer (2003–2004, resigned)
  - Charlie Huggins, R-Wasilla (2004–2013)
- District D (2013–2023)
  - Mike J. Dunleavy, R-Wasilla (2013-1/15/2018, resigned)
  - Mike Shower, R-Wasilla (2/22/2018-2023 (appointed by Gov. Walker))
- District O (2023–present)
  - Mike Shower, R-Wasilla (2023-)

Representation in the Alaska House of Representatives

- District 9 (1959–1963)
  - James J. Hurley, D-Palmer (1959–1961)
  - Jalmar M. Kerttula, D-Palmer (1961–1963)
- District 7 (1963–1973)
  - Eugene Reid, R-Palmer (1963–1965)
  - Jalmar M. Kerttula (1965–1973)
- District 6 (1973–1983)
  - Alfred O. Ose, D-Palmer (1973–1979)
  - Patrick J. Carney, D-Wasilla (1979–1983)
- District 16 (1983–1993) – increasing population in the MSB during the 1970s meant that the borough was apportioned two seats. The scheme in place for this redistricting cycle placed the more densely populated portions of Alaska into two-member districts, with designated seats A and B.
  - District 16, Seat A
    - Barbara Lacher, R-Wasilla (1983–1985)
    - Katie Hurley, D-Wasilla (1985–1987)
    - Curt Menard, R (later switched to D)-Wasilla (1987–1991)
    - Patrick J. Carney (1991–1993)
  - District 16, Seat B – represented by Ronald L. Larson (D-Palmer) throughout its existence

Subsequent redistrictings created 40 House districts and 20 Senate districts. This was included with the redistricting amendments to the Alaska Constitution ratified by voters in 1998, which means that future redistricting boards are compelled to follow the same scheme.

- District 28 (1993–2003)
  - Curt Menard (1993–1995)
  - Beverly Masek, R-Willow (1995–2003)
- District 15 (2003–2013)
  - Beverly Masek (2003–2005, lost renomination)
  - Mark Neuman, R-Big Lake (2005–2013)
- District 7 (2013–present) – represented by Wes Keller (R-Wasilla) since its inception

== Education ==
Talkeetna Elementary School serves grades K–6. Its mascot is the Timber Wolf.

Susitna Valley Junior-Senior High School opened in 2010, replacing the one that burned down in 2007 while the roof was being repaired. In the interim, classes were held in portables on the grounds of the Upper Susitna Senior Center. Susitna Valley Junior-Senior High School's mascot is the Ram.

== Media ==
Talkeetna has a community radio station, 88.9 KTNA, with locally hosted shows and NPR programming. The local newspaper, the Good Times, has a distribution of 7,500 and serves Talkeetna, Trapper Creek, Willow, Houston and Big Lake, with additional distribution along the Parks Highway as far north as Nenana during the summer. The Good Times is published every other week in print. Its publishers also publish a local phone book and an annual visitors’ guide. Another newspaper, The Alaska Pioneer Press, which was under different ownership and was published monthly, ceased publication in 2011, after its owners moved out of the area. Whole Wheat Radio, an independent webcast, began in 2002 and ceased in 2010.

== Transportation ==
Talkeetna is served by Talkeetna Airport, which is home to several air taxi companies that provide flightseeing trips and support for mountain climbers. Many of the air taxi companies were started to ferry climbers from Talkeetna to Denali, as Talkeetna has the easiest access to the mountain's south side, where the main base camp is. Legendary bush pilots such as Don Sheldon and Cliff Hudson, both based in Talkeetna, pioneered glacier flying on Denali. Their companies, Talkeetna Air Taxi and Hudson Air Service (now operating as Sheldon Air Service), respectively, are still in operation.

The Talkeetna Airstrip is a restricted use airstrip and on the list of National Historic Places also.

Talkeetna Depot is a stop on the Denali Star, Aurora Winter Train, and Hurricane Turn trains of the Alaska Railroad.

Sunshine Transit provides public transit for the Upper Susitna Valley five days a week along the Talkeetna Spur Road. It serves Talkeetna, Trapper Creek, Willow, and Houston.

== In popular culture ==
Talkeetna was mentioned in Travel Channel's Man v. Food. In season 2 episode 16, the host travels to the Roadhouse, a Talkeetna restaurant, to sample its breakfast dishes. Also featured is West Rib Pub & Cafe.

According to a journalist, the town Cicely from the TV series Northern Exposure could have been based on Talkeetna, but no one from the show has confirmed that. Filming took place in Roslyn, Washington.

Talkeetna features heavily in Railroad Alaska on Discovery Channel. The show has three seasons and deals with the lives of people who work the railway and off-the-grid residents who depend on the railroad for supplies and access to medical facilities.
