= Kahiltna Glacier =

Glacier in Alaska, United States

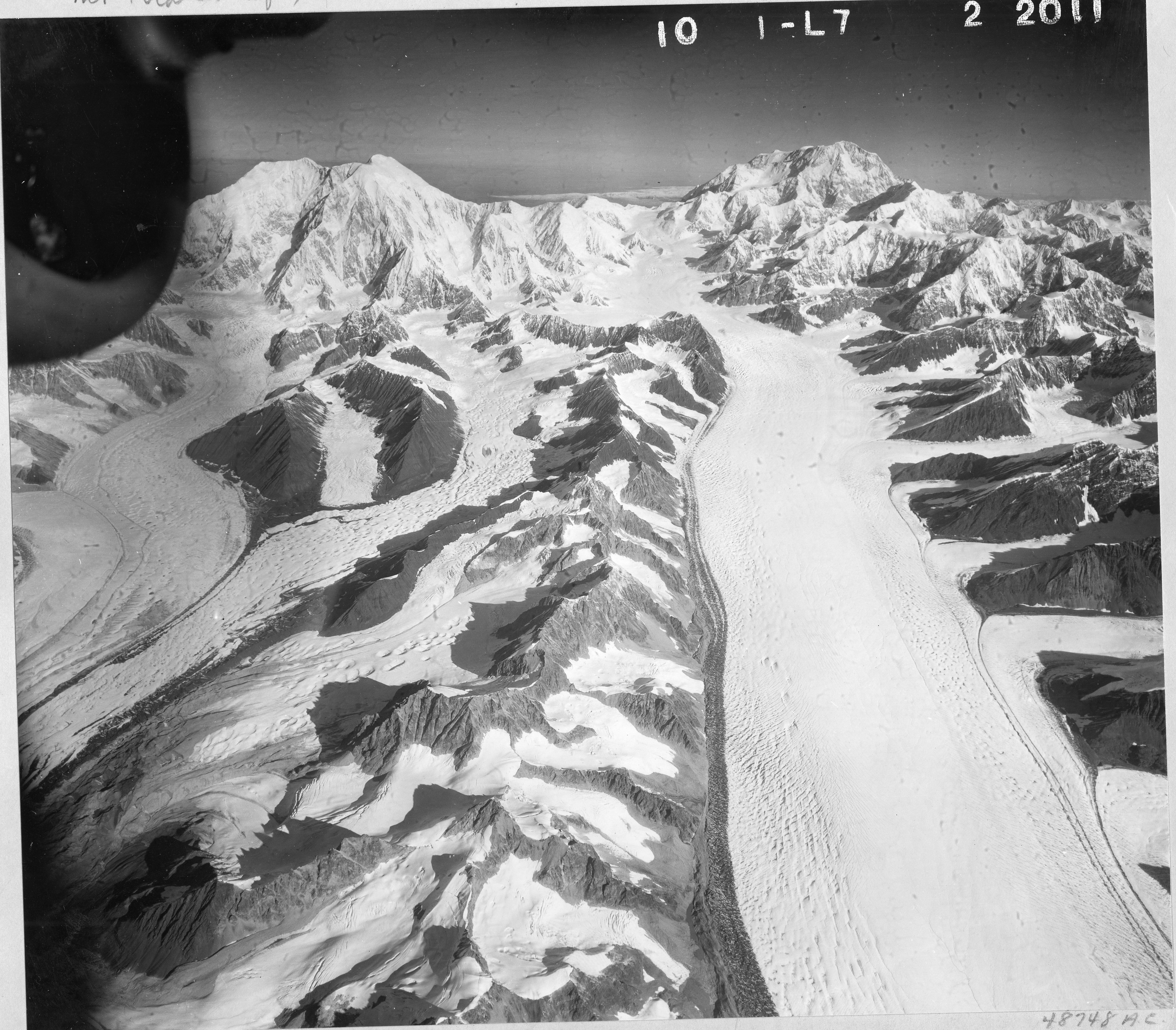
- Kahiltna Glacier to the right

- Location within Alaska
- Interactive map of Kahiltna Glacier
- Type: Valley glacier
- Location: Denali Borough, Alaska and Matanuska-Susitna Borough, Alaska, U.S.
- Coordinates: 62°45′57″N 151°18′12″W
- Length: 44 miles (71 km)

Kahiltna Glacier is the longest glacier of the Alaska Range in the U.S. state of Alaska. It starts on the southwest slope of Denali near Kahiltna Pass (elevation 10,320 ft (3,150 m)). Its main channel runs almost due south between Mount Foraker to the west and Mount Hunter to the east. The name was first reported as "Car-ilt-nu Glacier" by Alaska Range explorer Lt. J.S. Herron in 1902. An alternate name is Kagheltnu Li'a. Kahiltna Glacier is the longest glacier in the Alaska Range at 44 miles (71 km) in length.

== Forks ==
The glacier has a few notable forks. The Northeast Fork lies just under, and to the south of, the large plateau which houses the 14,000-foot (4,300 m) camp on the standard West Buttress route of Denali. It also provides access to the less popular, but more technical, West Rib and Cassin Ridge routes. The East Fork is rarely visited, but provides access to the west side of the South Buttress of Denali. The mouth of the Southeast Fork is the site of the seasonal airstrip and base camp for Denali at approximately the 7,000 foot elevation. This location is officially just outside the southern boundary of the wilderness portion of Denali National Park and Preserve. However, in actuality, the airstrip is generally located on the boundary or just north of the line, but the park service tends to overlook this fact. It also serves as the base camp for climbers attempting routes on the west or north sides of the formidable Mount Hunter, which rises just south of the Southeast Fork, and on the east or southeast sides of Mount Foraker, which lies just across the main part of the glacier.

Many other unnamed forks split off to the east from the main stream of the glacier in the region south of Mount Hunter, providing access to a complex of small but steep rock peaks, popular with climbers, known as Little Switzerland. The snout of the glacier lies further to the south, at elevation approximately 1,000 ft (300 m), where the glacier gives rise to the Kahiltna River.

== See also ==
- List of glaciers
