= Ryan McDonough (cardiologist) =

American cardiologist (1978–2025)

- Born: 1978
- Died: December 13, 2025 (aged 46); Wasilla, Alaska, U.S.
- Cause of death: Self-inflicted gunshot wound
- Occupation: Cardiologist
- Board member of: Alaska State Medical Board
- Criminal charges: Possession of child sexual abuse material
- Children: 3

Ryan McDonough (1978 – December 13, 2025) was an American cardiologist and a member of the Alaska State Medical Board from August to November 2025. He was arrested on December 11, 2025, on ten felony counts of possession of child sexual abuse material and died from a self-inflicted gunshot wound two days later.

== Education and career ==
Ryan McDonough graduated with a Bachelor of Science undergraduate degree at the United States Military Academy in West Point, New York, in 2001. He initially pursued military intelligence before studying medicine. He graduated from Lake Erie College of Osteopathic Medicine with a medical degree in 2007. He completed his Internal Medicine Residency at the Madigan Army Medical Center in Washington before completing a Cardiology Fellowship at the Brooke Army Medical Center in Texas. He completed an Interventional Cardiology Fellowship in 2014 at Duke University in North Carolina. He served as chief of cardiology services at both William Beaumont Army Medical Center in Texas and Weatherby Locums in Florida. In 2019, he joined the Alaska Heart & Vascular Institute.

McDonough worked as an interventional cardiologist at the Mat-Su Regional Medical Center and Mat-Su Medical Group. In August 2025, Alaska governor Mike Dunleavy appointed McDonough to the Alaska State Medical Board. While on the board, McDonough voted in favor of classifying transgender health care for minors as "unprofessional conduct" and restricting such medical care. Additionally, he voted to advance a measure to allow the board to punish physicians that provide transgender health care. He participated in multiple deliberations of malpractice allegations against other Alaska physicians. He also voted to recommend that lawmakers end legal access to abortion during late stages of pregnancy in Alaska. McDonough attended the Alaska State Medical Board meetings in August and September 2025 but was not present for the October and November meetings. He resigned from the board in November 2025 but did not provide a reason for his resignation.

== Personal life ==
McDonough was stationed in Alaska from 2001 to 2003 and met his wife during that period. He and his wife had three children. In a 2019 article by Alaska Business Magazine, he stated that his children enjoyed music, ballet, and sports. He also stated that his family enjoyed skiing, hiking, and fishing together.

=== Arrest and death ===
The Anchorage Police Department began investigating McDonough around July 2025 after the National Center for Missing & Exploited Children forwarded a tip from Dropbox that apparent child sexual abuse material had been uploaded by McDonough's account. After obtaining a search warrant for his Internet service provider, his Google account, and his Dropbox account, Alaska police found multiple folders containing videos depicting the sexual abuse of young children and infants. In December 2025, a task force composed of members of the Anchorage Police Department, the Alaska Bureau of Investigation, and United States Department of Homeland Security executed a search warrant and seized McDonough's electronic devices from his home.

The task force, dubbed "Task Force Dawnbreaker", arrested McDonough on ten charges of possessing child sexual abuse material on December 11, 2025. He pleaded not guilty to all ten charges and was released on a $50,000 cash bail, which was paid by his wife. On December 13, 2025, McDonough's house in Wasilla, Alaska burned down. He was the sole occupant at the time. McDonough was initially declared a missing person after the fire but was declared dead when Alaska State Troopers identified his remains in the burned home. He was 46. In January 2026, the Alaska State Medical Examiner's Office announced that the cause of death was determined to have been a self-inflicted gunshot wound.
