= Levi Johnston =

American model and actor (born 1990)

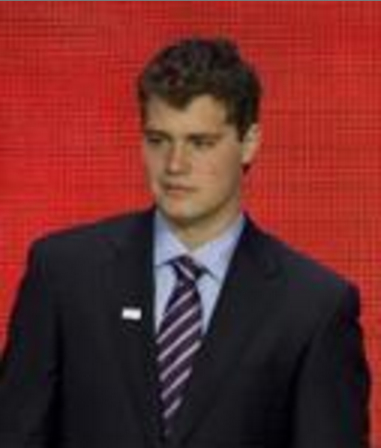
- Johnston at the 2008 Republican National Convention
- Born: Levi Keith Johnston; May 3, 1990 (age 36); Wasilla, Alaska, U.S.
- Political party: Republican
- Spouse: Sunny Oglesby (m. 2012)
- Partner: Bristol Palin (2005–2010)
- Children: 4

Levi Keith Johnston (born May 3, 1990) is best known as the twice-former fiancé of Bristol Palin and father of their son Tripp. He first received media attention in August 2008 when U.S. vice presidential candidate Sarah Palin announced that her daughter Bristol was five months pregnant by Johnston and that the two were engaged. The couple ultimately ended their relationship, and Johnston and the Palin family engaged in several public feuds.

After working in the Alaskan oil fields, Johnston pursued a career in the entertainment industry, aspiring to be a model and an actor. He has written a book based on his experiences with the Palins, titled Deer in the Headlights.

== Early life and education ==
Johnston was born in Wasilla, Alaska, the first-born child of Sherry (née Sampson) and Keith Johnston. Levi has one sibling, Mercede "Sadie" Johnston. Levi attended Wasilla High School, where he played on the hockey team, but did not graduate. He worked full-time on the Alaska North Slope oil fields as an apprentice electrician, quitting in January 2009.

== Relationship with Bristol Palin ==
According to Johnston, he and Bristol Palin began dating during their freshman year of high school. After losing a promise ring on a caribou hunt, Johnston had Bristol's name tattooed on his finger.

Following the announcement that she would be Senator John McCain's running mate in the November 2008 U.S. presidential election, Sarah Palin announced that her daughter Bristol was pregnant by Johnston, and that the two would be married. Johnston denied claims that he was being pressured into a shotgun wedding, stating, "We were planning on getting married a long time ago with or without the kid. That was the plan from the start." The couple's son, Tripp Easton Mitchell Johnston, was born in December 2008, but the two broke off their engagement in March 2009. In May 2009, Johnston said that their relationship was improving and that they were determined to jointly raise Tripp. Later, Bristol began a child custody case against Johnston, seeking sole custody and child support.

In July 2010, Bristol Palin and Johnston announced that they had reunited and were engaged for the second time; less than three weeks later, they ended their second engagement.

== Media attention ==
=== During the 2008 U.S. presidential election ===
Johnston attended the 2008 Republican National Convention with the Palin family. While Sarah Palin was delivering her prime-time nomination acceptance speech, the cameras frequently cut away to Johnston and Bristol. Johnston shook hands onstage with Sarah Palin's running mate, Republican presidential candidate, Senator John McCain, and was treated as a member of Palin's family.

=== 2009 interviews ===
After his 2009 breakup with Bristol, Johnston gave a series of nationally televised interviews. He appeared on The Tyra Banks Show with his mother and sister. Remarking on Bristol's public appearances to promote sexual abstinence, Johnston told The Early Show that "abstinence is a great idea" but said it was unrealistic to think it is going to work for teens. In another interview, he said that he was "pretty sure" Sarah Palin had known that he and Bristol were having sex in the family's house.

The Palin family denounced Johnston's statements as lies, with one public statement reading, "We're disappointed that Levi and his family, in a quest for fame, attention, and fortune, are engaging in flat-out lies, gross exaggeration, and even distortion of their relationship."

In August 2009, Johnston speculated that Sarah Palin's early resignation from office was due to long-standing marital difficulties, the pressures of the job, and lucrative book and other media offers. In a September 2009 Vanity Fair interview, Johnston alleged that Sarah Palin initially wanted the couple to keep Bristol's pregnancy a secret and offered to adopt the baby and raise him as her own, but that he and Bristol rejected the plan. In response, Sarah told the media Johnston's statements were "untrue, malicious, and appalling", emphasizing that she highly appreciated her children and commenting that Johnston's photoshoots were "attention-seeking and desperate".

=== 2010 apology and subsequent retraction ===
In July 2010, a week prior to the announcement that he and Bristol were engaged a second time, Johnston issued a statement, saying, "I publicly said things about the Palins that were not completely true. I have already privately apologized to Todd and Sarah. Since my statements were public, I owe it to the Palins to publicly apologize." After the brief second engagement ended, Johnston said that he regretted issuing the apology, saying, "it kind of makes me sound like a liar. I've never lied about anything."

== 2011 Wasilla mayoral election ==
In August 2010, Johnston announced his candidacy for the October 2011 election for mayor of Wasilla, Alaska, saying he wanted his son, Tripp, to be proud of him. Incumbent mayor Verne E. Rupright responded that Johnston's announcement was a little early and said "I think it would be wise for him to get a high school diploma and keep his clothes on"—a reference to Johnston's modeling career. Bristol Palin responded saying that she was unaware of Johnston's political ambitions, adding "I'm glad that Levi has not given up on completing his education and is looking for steady employment." Johnston's manager stated he hoped to copy the rise of Sarah Palin from mayor of Wasilla to governor of Alaska, "creating a rural, Alaskan version of the Bush political dynasty." It was reported that Johnston's bid for mayor would tie into his proposed reality television series.

In September 2010, Public Policy Polling reported that Johnston had become the most unpopular person polled in his home state, with a six percent approval and 72 percent disapproval rating, replacing former Democratic presidential candidate and senator John Edwards.

In August 2011, six weeks before the October 4 election, Johnston dropped out of the race.

== Other activities ==
Johnston hired Anchorage, Alaska, attorney Rex Butler (who was previously best known for representing criminal defendants and handling civil litigation) to represent him in his pursuit of a career in the entertainment industry. The Associated Press reported in July 2009 that Johnston was also pursuing a movie deal.

Johnston and comedian Kathy Griffin attended the 2009 Teen Choice Awards together. She later stated that he was "surprisingly sweet and courteous" to her. Johnston and Griffin's acquaintance is documented in the sixth season of Griffin's reality television series, Kathy Griffin: My Life on the D-List. Additionally, as a gag in her stand-up comedy routine, Griffin often referred to the acquaintance as a relationship, and Johnston as her boyfriend.

In October 2009, Johnston appeared in a television commercial for Roll International, makers of Wonderful Pistachios, as part of their "Get Crackin" advertising campaign. The commercial features Johnston, with a bodyguard, opening a pistachio as a voice-over states, "Now Levi Johnston does it with protection."

It was reported that Johnston would pose fully nude for Playgirl magazine; however, following a statement by Sarah Palin that referred to Johnston's "aspiring porn career", it was announced that Johnston's photo shoot would not include full frontal nudity.

Politico reported in April 2010 that Johnston was working on a memoir "that would air the true story of the Palin household." Johnston's book, Deer in the Headlights: My Life in Sarah Palin's Crosshairs, was published in September 2011.

Johnston appeared as a celebrity coach to Logan Cummins in the pilot of a reality television show titled Mansformation released in May 2013.

== Personal life ==
Johnston married Sunny Oglesby on October 28, 2012. A month prior to the wedding, the couple's first daughter was born. Their second daughter was born in January 2015. Their third daughter was born on July 10, 2019.

== In popular culture ==
On September 28, 2010, Ben Folds and Nick Hornby released an album called Lonely Avenue, which featured a track entitled "Levi Johnston's Blues". The song provides an account of Johnston's story, based on actual posts Johnston had uploaded to his own MySpace webpage.

Alaska singer-songwriter Marian Call has said that "The Avocado Song" was inspired by Johnston.

In the HBO film Game Change (2012), Johnston is portrayed by actor Justin Gaston.
