= Wasilla Lake =

Lake in the state of Alaska, United States

- Lach Bena
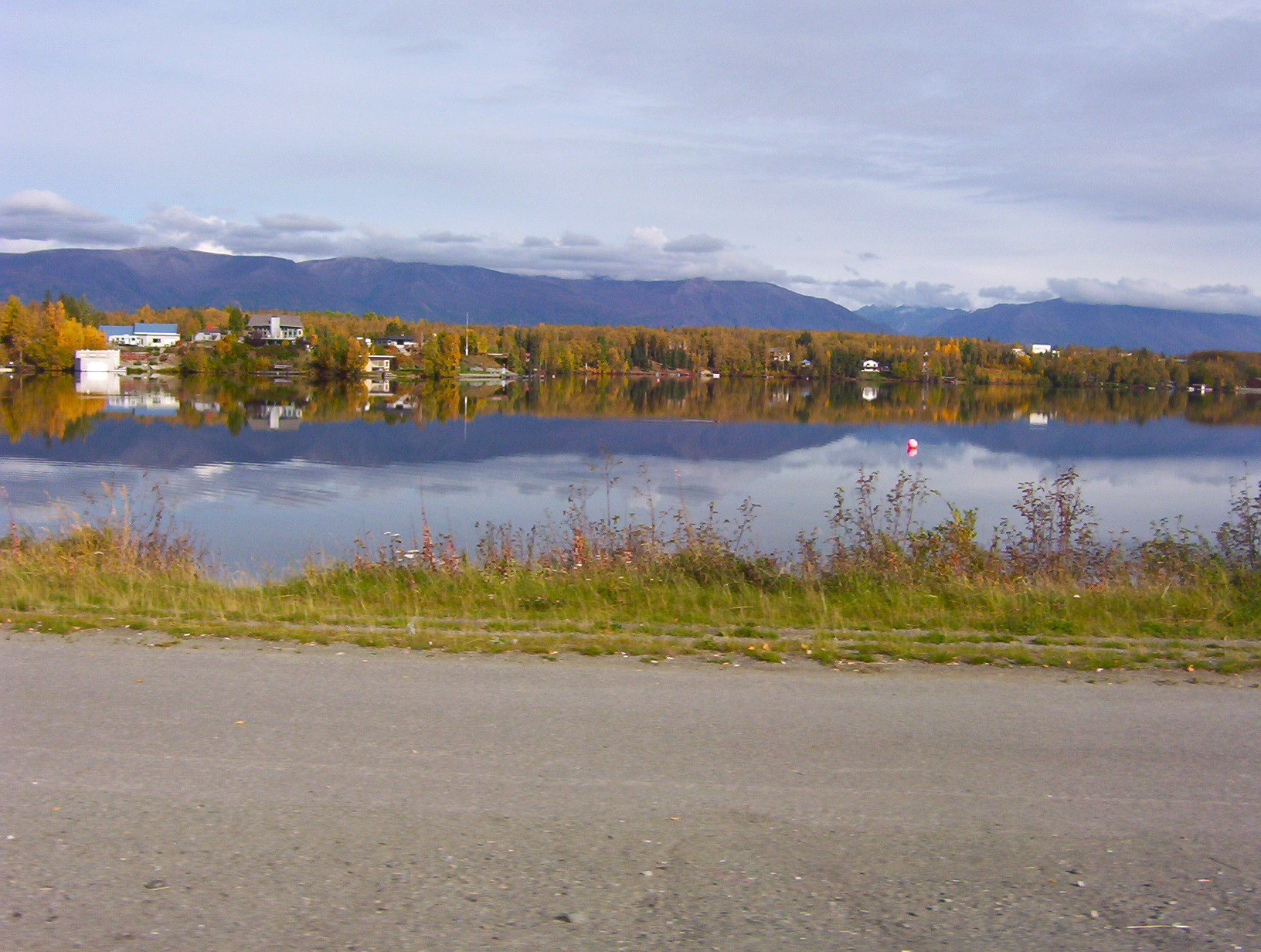
- The lake seen from the George Parks Highway

- Location within Alaska Location within North America
- Location: Wasilla, Alaska
- Coordinates: 61°35′14″N 149°23′33″W
- Primary inflows: Wasilla Creek
- Primary outflows: Cottonwood Creek
- Basin countries: United States
- Average depth: 17 feet (5.2 m)
- Max. depth: 48 feet (15 m)
- Water volume: 279,306,668 cubic feet (7,909,084.1 m^{3})
- Shore length^{1}: 4.4 miles (7.1 km)
- ^{1} Shore length is not a well-defined measure.

Wasilla Lake is a lake in Wasilla, Alaska, named by workers constructing the Alaska Railroad after a nearby creek named Wasilla Creek. The lake shore is the site of a city park, Newcomb Park. It is the northern terminus of the Seven-Mile Canoe Trail, the other end being at Finger Lake. Outside of the park areas, most of the shoreline is private property. The lake has a stable population of rainbow trout and fishing is considered good for bank, boat, and ice fishing.
