= Mat-Su Regional Medical Center =

- Community Health Systems

- View of a corridor inside the hospital

Geography
- Location: Gateway, Matanuska-Susitna Borough, Alaska, United States
- Coordinates: 61°33′45″N 149°15′29″W

Organization
- Care system: Community Health Systems
- Type: General

Services
- Emergency department: Yes
- Beds: 125

History
- Founded: 2006

Links
- Website: www.matsuregional.com
- Lists: Hospitals in Alaska

Mat-Su Regional Medical Center is a 125-bed general hospital in the U.S. state of Alaska. The hospital is owned by Community Health Systems (CHS). Located in the Gateway census-designated place, between Palmer and Wasilla, it is the principal hospital for the Matanuska-Susitna Borough. Owing to its location a short distance from the interchange of the Glenn and Parks Highways, Mat-Su Regional (along with the hospital on Joint Base Elmendorf-Richardson for those eligible to receive care there) serves as a principal hospital for many of the Glenn Highway communities in northern Anchorage, such as Chugiak, Eagle River, Eklutna and Peters Creek.

Built at a cost of $87,700,000 to replace the aging Valley Hospital in downtown Palmer, construction on the hospital began in spring 2004. The hospital opened on January 27, 2006. The three-story, 197,690 square feet (18,366 m^{2}) facility contains fifty medical/surgical beds and eight each of intensive care, progressive care, and obstetric beds, all in private rooms. There are four operating rooms, plus a fifth designated for Caesarean sections. The unfinished third floor provides room for a sixth operating room and 52 more general beds.

Mat-Su Regional also operates a large outpatient clinic on the edge of downtown Wasilla, next to Wasilla High School.
