= Mount POW/MIA =

Mountain in Alaska, United States

- Location within Alaska

Highest point
- Elevation: 4,280 feet (1,300 m)+
- Coordinates: 61°26′45″N 149°11′55″W

Geography
- Location: Anchorage Municipality, Alaska, U.S.
- Parent range: Chugach Mountains
- Topo map: USGS Anchorage B-6

Climbing
- Easiest route: From the south side

Mount POW/MIA is a mountain in the U.S. state of Alaska that has been dedicated to all the soldiers that are or have been given the status of Prisoner of War or Missing in Action (POW/MIA). The mountain is just north of Eklutna Lake and is west of Twin peaks and Bull Peak, six miles southeast of Wasilla in Chugach State Park. There is a POW/MIA flag placed atop of Mount POW/MIA and is replaced annually by the Local Colony Army JROTC program during Memorial weekend in May.

POW/MIA flag (image designed by Newt Heisley)

The black and white flag was designed by the National League of Families of American Prisoners and Missing in Southeast Asia and has been flown at the White House.

This mountain was originally known to locals by the name Anvil Peak and was renamed by the efforts of John Morrissey, a Vietnam veteran from Patterson, New York. Morrissey, with the help of veterans advocate Leo Kaye, pressed the USGS to recognize the mountain as a monument for all American soldiers that have been prisoners of war (POW) or missing in action (MIA) in America's past and future conflicts. The two veterans' mission was completed on Veterans Day 1999 with the official naming of the mountain. John Morrissey died in New York September 19, 2007. His ashes were placed to rest on the mountain on June 17, 2008.

== Ascent ==
The first ascent of the mountain is unknown, but was prior to the recorded ascent by Steve Wilson and Wayne Todd on July 19, 1997, where they noted a previously established cairn on the summit. An ascent by Colony JROTC was made in May 1999. The mountain was formally named by USGS in 1999 and is currently the highest, largest natural "Living Monument" in the world.

The mountain is easily seen from the Alaska Veterans Wall in Palmer, Alaska located next to the Glenn Highway/Parks Highway Interchange and from American Legion Susitna Valley Post 35, Parks Highway Mile 46. The hike is moderate and can be done in 2–6 hours. The mountain can be climbed year-round, but is best done between May and August. Early in the season a climber can glissade a snow field between 250 and 500 ft long. There an unofficial trail that begins near power pole #85 or in the vicinity of mile 5 on the north side of the Eklutna Lake road. There is no parking at the trailhead. A small pullout at around mile 4.5 is the best parking location.

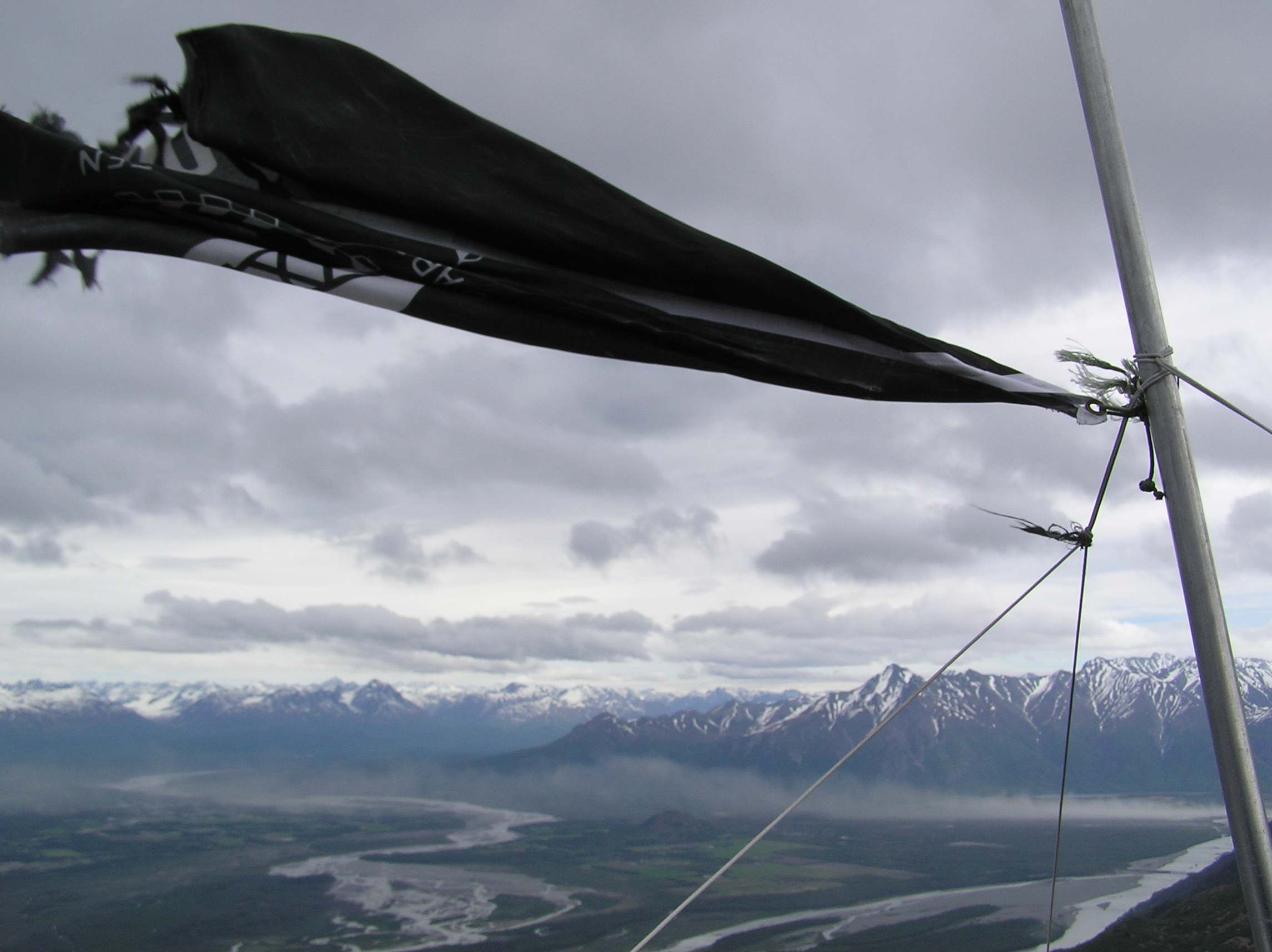
The POW/MIA Flag on the mountain
