= Finger Lake (Alaska) =

Lake in the state of Alaska, United States

- Baqay Tuch'elisht Bena
- Bakiatutsilictmuna (Denaʼina)
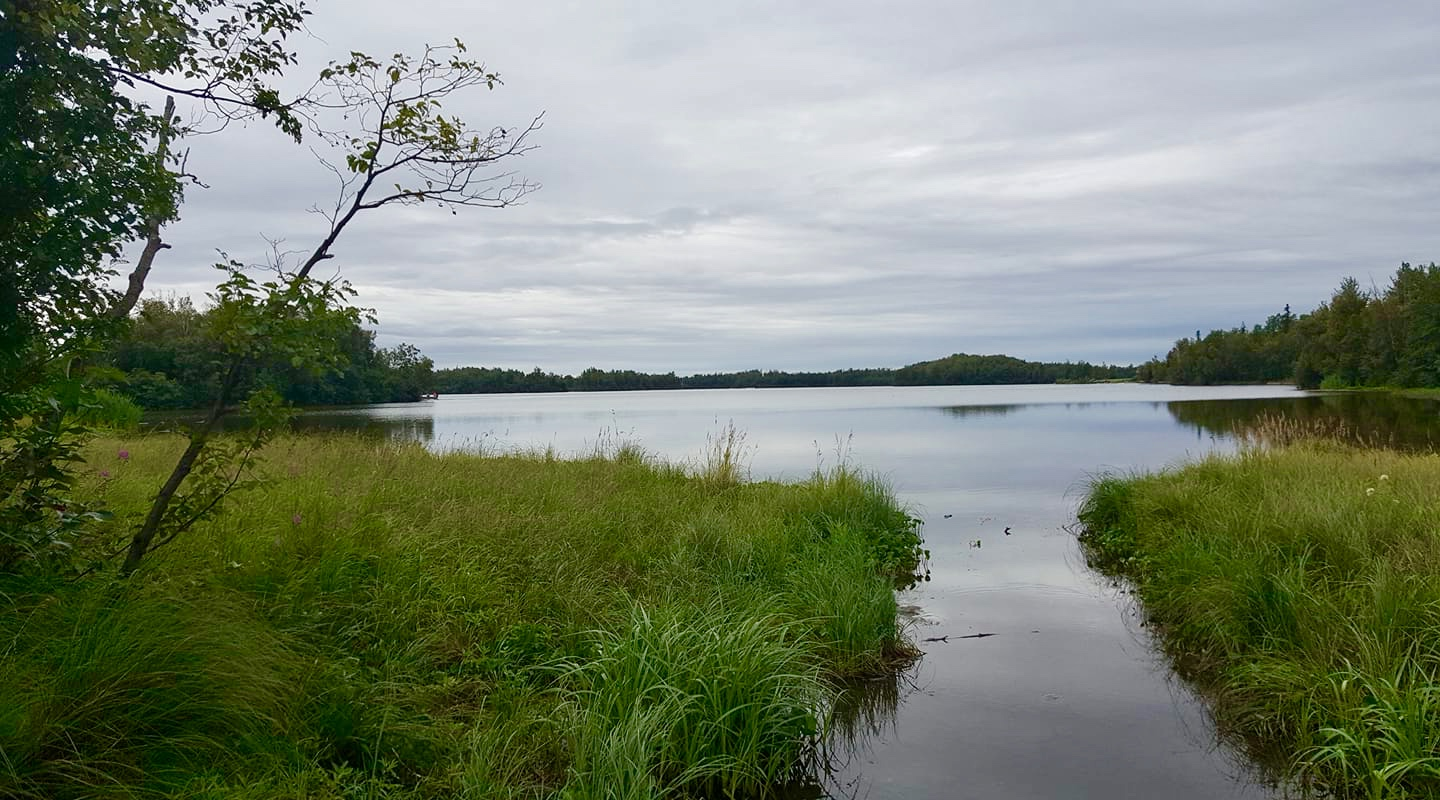

- Location within Alaska Location within North America
- Location: Wasilla, Alaska
- Coordinates: 61.605°N 149.281°W
- Primary outflows: one small, unnamed creek
- Surface area: 146 acres (59 ha)
- Max. depth: 13.4 meters (44 ft)
- Surface elevation: 103 meters (338 ft)
- Frozen: winter months

Finger Lake is a lake in Wasilla, Alaska. It is not technically a finger lake, but was named so by Captain Edwin Glenn, who led an army expedition to Alaska in 1898 and felt that "when viewing the lake on a map, a point of land in the lake gives the impression of a finger." The lake has populations of Rainbow Trout, Arctic Char and Arctic Grayling and is a popular fishing spot, including ice fishing in winter. The lake is at the south end of the Seven-mile canoe trail that ends at Wasilla Lake, the only portage is at the north end of Finger Lake.

== Park ==
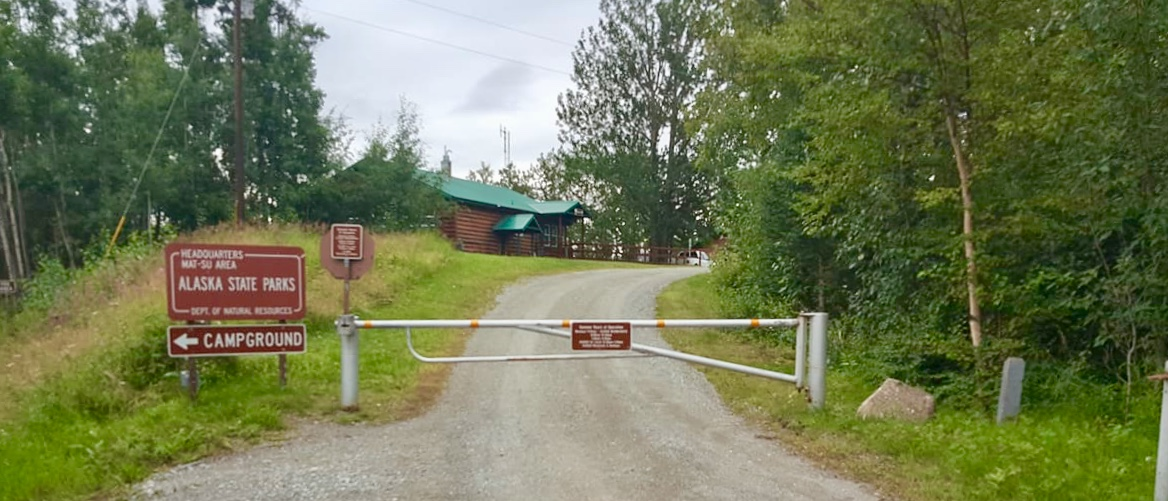
Regional headquarters

Alaska State Parks operates the Finger Lake State Recreation Area, a 69 acres (28 ha) park with a campground, boat launch, and picnic areas. The park also contains the regional headquarters for Matanuska-Susitna Valley area parks.
