= Providence Alaska Medical Center =

- Providence Health & Services

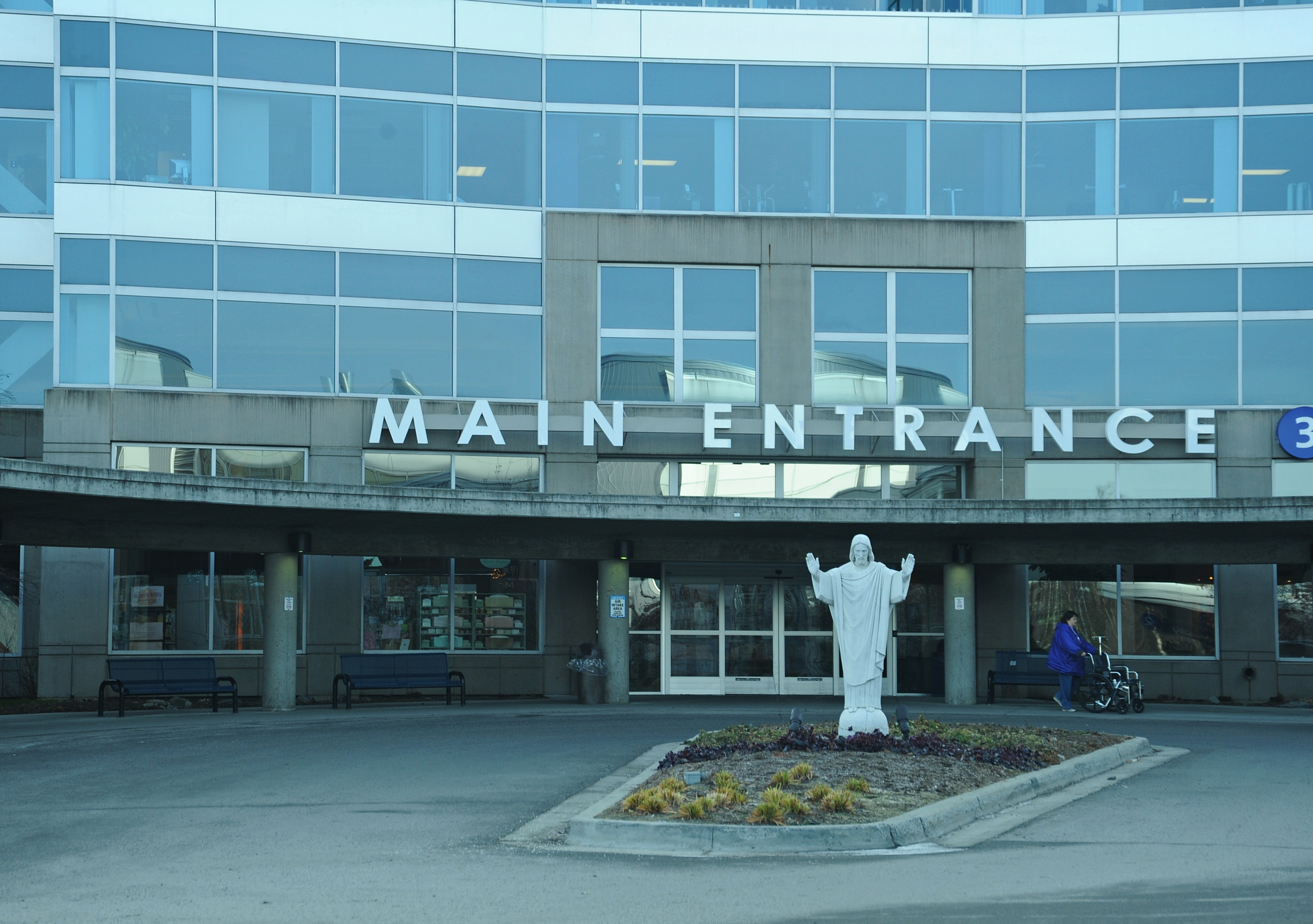
- View of the hospital's main entrance in 2010.

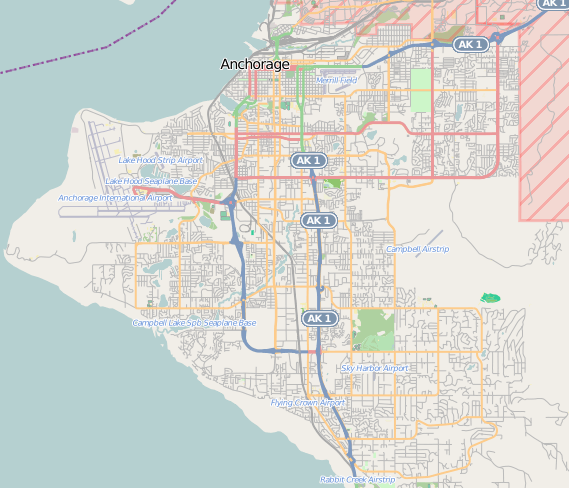
- Location on a map of Anchorage Providence Alaska Medical Center (Alaska)

Geography
- Location: Anchorage, Alaska, United States
- Coordinates: 61°11′18″N 149°49′08″W

Organization
- Affiliated university: University of Washington

Services
- Emergency department: Level II trauma center
- Beds: 401

Helipads
- Helipad: FAA LID: AK38
Number	Length		Surface
Number	ft	m	Surface
H1	60	18	asphalt

History
- Founded: 1937 (as Providence Hospital in downtown Anchorage); 1962 (present location)

Links
- Website: alaska.providence.org
- Lists: Hospitals in Alaska

Providence Alaska Medical Center is Alaska's largest hospital by revenue and number of beds. It has 401 beds, 1190 nurses and more than 850 physicians on staff. It is often ranked the largest private employer in Alaska. It is located at 3200 Providence Drive in Anchorage, Alaska, across the street from the main campus of the University of Alaska Anchorage. The hospital is accredited by the Joint Commission.

== Description ==
Divisions include: The Children's Hospital at Providence, a Maternity Center, which houses the state's only Level III Neonatal Intensive Care Unit; Heart and Cancer Centers; Alaska's largest emergency department with LifeMed Alaska air ambulance transport and one of only two trauma centers in the state; full diagnostic, rehabilitation and surgical services; and both inpatient and outpatient mental health and substance abuse recovery services for adults and children. Other programs include a Family Practice Center, Sleep Disorders Center, Providence Imaging Center, Providence Home Health Care and telemedicine services for other Alaskan communities.

Providence Alaska Medical Center in Anchorage is part of the Providence Health & Services in Alaska, which oversees several other Alaska medical centers and long-term care facilities, and part of the Providence St. Joseph Health System. With more than 5,000 employees, Providence Health & Services Alaska is the largest private employer in Alaska, as of 2022.

== Accreditation ==
Providence Alaska Medical Center is accredited through the Joint Commission of Hospital Accreditation. The hospital holds national accreditation for its radiation oncology department through the American College of Radiology. The sleep disorder center is accredited through the American Academy of Sleep Medicine.

== Expansion ==
In 2010, the hospital began a $150.3-million expansion project including the NICU, Prenatal and Mother-Baby Units, surgery, pharmacy, sterile processing, and materials management. In January 2018, an expansion added a 13-bed Children's Emergency Care center to the Emergency Department. Providence Alaska Medical Center has transitioned to an Electronic Health Record (EHR) system.

== COVID-19 crisis ==
In August 2021, Andrea Caballero, an infectious disease doctor who works at Providence Hospital, said they were "on the verge of a hospital system collapse" due to the COVID-19 pandemic. There were staff shortages, lack of equipment and supplies, and too many unvaccinated people among the population for the hospitals to effectively treat. There were no mask or vaccine mandates in Anchorage, at the time; it was a policy of the recently elected mayor who successfully ran on a platform of no mask or vaccine mandates.
