= Wasilla Airport =

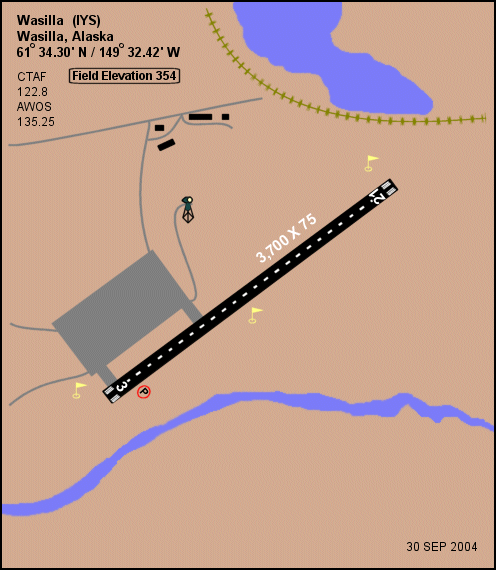
- IATA: WWA; ICAO: PAWS; FAA LID: IYS

Summary
- Airport type: Public
- Owner: City of Wasilla
- Serves: Wasilla, Alaska
- Elevation AMSL: 354 ft / 108 m
- Coordinates: 61°34′19″N 149°32′22″W
- Website: https://www.cityofwasilla.com/departments-divisions/municipal-airport

Map
- Location of airport in Alaska

Runways
Direction	Length		Surface
Direction	ft	m	Surface
3/21	3,700	1,128	Asphalt
3S/21S	1,690	515	Turf/gravel

Statistics
- Based aircraft: 100
- Source: Federal Aviation Administration

Wasilla Airport (IATA: WWA, ICAO: PAWS, FAA LID: IYS) is a city-owned public-use airport located about 3.5 miles (6 km) west of the central business district of Wasilla, a city in the Matanuska-Susitna Borough of the U.S. state of Alaska. Wasilla is 17 miles by air and 47 miles by road from Anchorage, the largest city in Alaska.

The airport was moved in 1993.

== Facilities and aircraft ==
Wasilla Airport has an asphalt paved runway designated 4/22 which measures 3,700 by 75 feet (1,128 x 23 m). It also has a turf and gravel runway (4S/22S) which is 1,690 by 60 feet (515 x 18 m). There are 100 aircraft based at this airport, all single-engine.

The airport is open year-round and has radio controlled runway, taxiway and security lighting. It offers engine and airframe repair, fuel, and air-taxi services.

== See also ==
- List of airports in Alaska
