= Lake Lucille =

Lake in the state of Alaska, United States

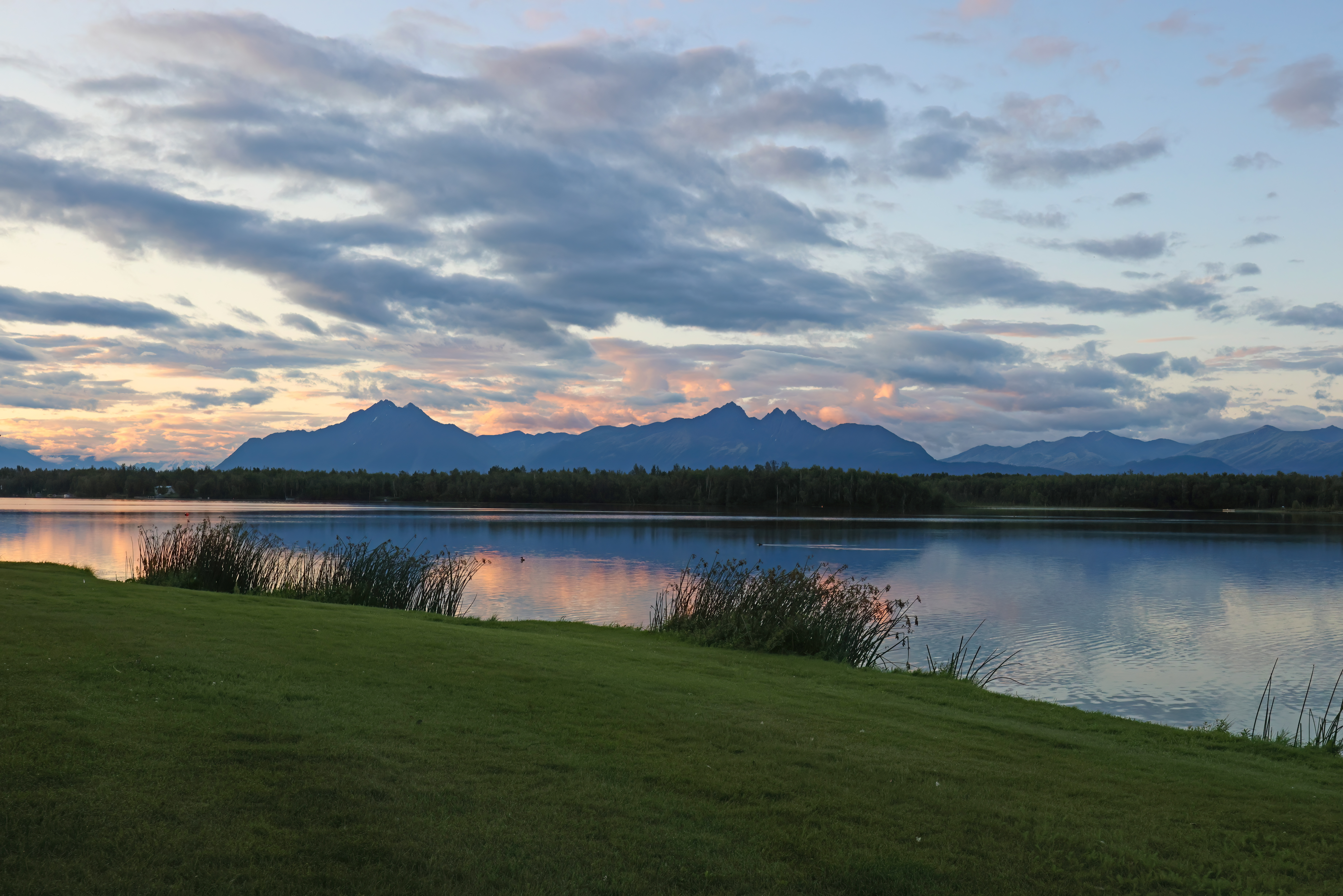
- Lake Lucille

- Location within Alaska Location within North America
- Location: Wasilla, Alaska
- Coordinates: 61°34′29″N 149°28′17″W
- Basin countries: United States
- Surface area: 350 acres (140 ha)

Lake Lucille is a 350-acre (1.4 km^{2}) lake within the municipal limits of Wasilla, Alaska, located at 61°34′N 149°28′W.

Most of the lake shoreline is private property (i.e., not incorporated into the City of Wasilla), and many residents have docks for swimming, boating, or docking floatplanes. There is also a city park with a campground and boat launch. "Lake Lucille is basically a dead lake -- it can't support a fish population" according to Michelle Church, a local environmentalist. State environmental officials say that leaching sewer lines and fertilizer runoff caused an explosion of plant growth in the lake, which sucked the oxygen out of the water and led to periodic fish kills.

Lake Lucille and Wasilla Lake are both immediately adjacent to the Parks Highway, the main route for travel between Fairbanks and Anchorage. Controlling runoff from the six-lane highway is considered a key to saving the lakes in Wasilla. "Anything that comes off an automobile -- oil, antifreeze, de-icing agents, heavy metals -- all of that can run off into the lakes when it rains," observed Archie Giddings, Wasilla's public works director.

Lake Lucille was listed as "impaired" in 1994 by the Alaska Department of Environmental Conservation and in 2008 still carried the same legal designation after twelve years of "Wasilla's frenzied development" under Mayor Sarah Palin (Oct 1996 - Oct 2002) and her successor as mayor, Dianne Keller (Oct 2002 - Oct 2008).

The private home of former Governor Sarah Palin overlooks Lake Lucille, and she gave her July 2009 resignation speech at its bank.

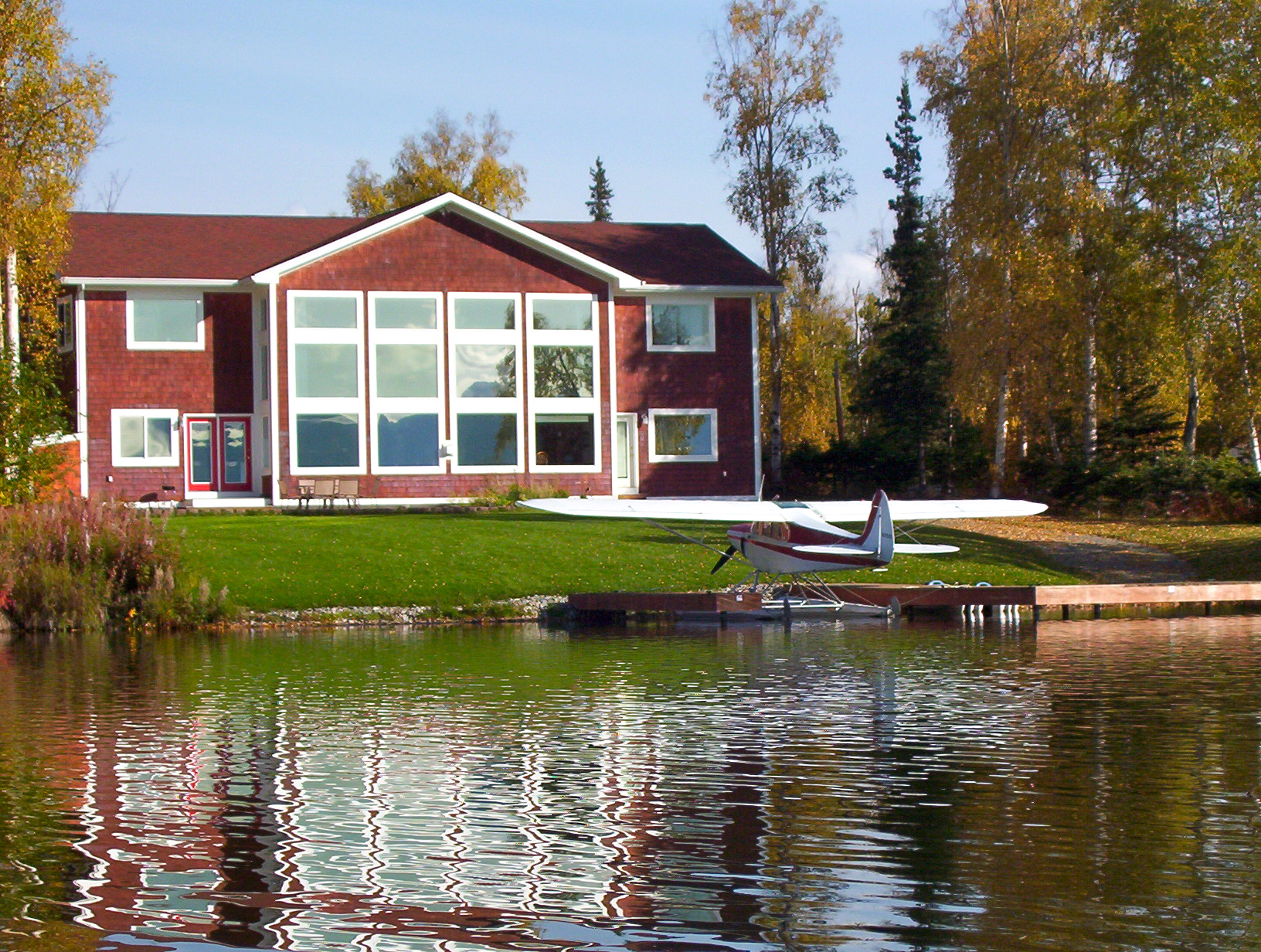
The home of Sarah Palin is a typical Lake Lucille property
