= Electro-mat =

An electro-mat, sometimes referred to as an anti-moose mat, is an electrical mat used to keep large wildlife such as moose or bears away from certain areas where their presence could cause issues. The mats give off a mild shock at a low electric current when stepped on, deterring animals from crossing over them.

In October 2005, the municipal airport in Wasilla, Alaska, a town about 40 miles (65 km) north of Anchorage, installed mats around the airfield to prevent moose from walking onto the runway and colliding with aircraft. The government of Arizona installed electro-mats in combination with electric fences and ramps in Tijeras Canyon in 2007 in an effort to deter wildlife from crossing at unsafe locations along Interstate 40 and New Mexico State Road 333.

In 2011, Parks Canada began a 5-year study to determine the feasibility of deploying electro-mats along the CP Rail lines inside Banff National Park. A large number of animals, including 12 grizzly bears, 30 black bears, 8 wolves, and over 300 ungulates were known to have died on the tracks between 2004-2013, and it was hoped that the use of the mats would be able to sufficiently deter wildlife and reduce those numbers.
