= Bristol Palin =

American public speaker (born 1990)

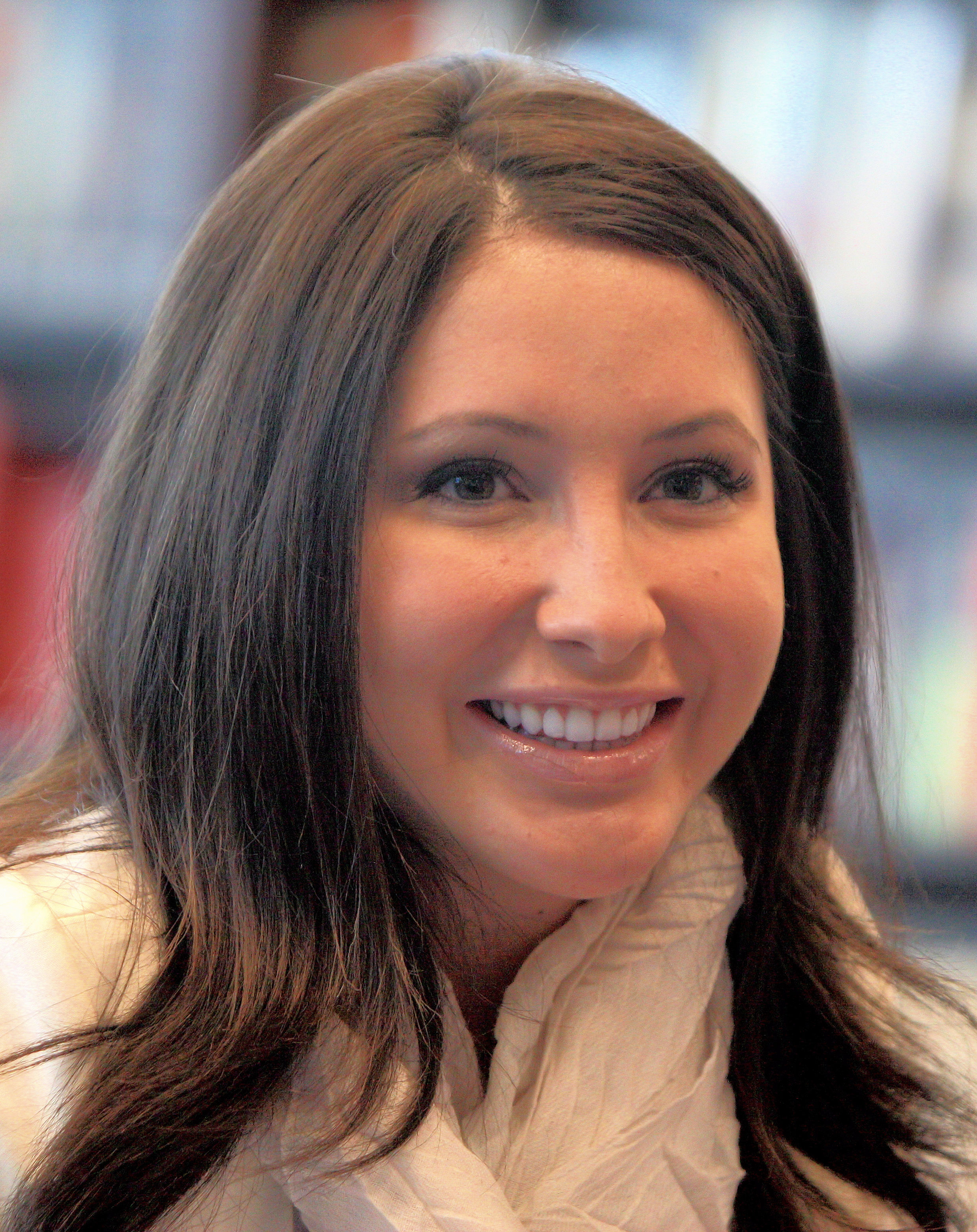
- Palin in 2011
- Born: Bristol Sheeran Marie Palin; October 18, 1990 (age 36); Wasilla, Alaska, U.S.
- Occupations: Public speaker, television personality
- Spouse: Dakota Meyer (m. 2016; div. 2018)
- Partner: Levi Johnston (2005–2010)
- Children: 3
- Parents: Todd Palin (father); Sarah Palin (mother)

Bristol Sheeran Marie Palin (born October 18, 1990) is an American real estate agent who is a former public speaker and reality television personality. She is the oldest daughter and second of five children of Todd and Sarah Palin.

Palin competed in the fall 2010 season of Dancing with the Stars and reached the finals, finishing in third place. In summer 2011, Palin released a memoir. In summer 2012, she starred in the Lifetime show Bristol Palin: Life's a Tripp. Her most recent television series was as a member of the fall celebrity cast of Dancing with the Stars's 15th season in 2012, where she was eliminated in the fourth week of competition.

== Early life ==
Palin was born in Wasilla, Alaska, to parents Todd and Sarah (née Heath) Palin. She was named "Bristol" after the Bristol Inn where her mother Sarah was employed; Bristol, Connecticut, the headquarters city of ESPN, where her mother Sarah hoped to work as a sportscaster; and the Bristol Bay area of Alaska, where her father Todd grew up. Her mother, Sarah, is of English, Irish, and German ancestry. Her father Todd has Yup'ik, Dutch, and English ancestry. Her father's grandmother Lena Andree grew up in the now abandoned community of Tuklung in a mixed race region of Bristol Bay. The daughter of a Dutch-American father and an enrolled Yup'ik mother, Andree spoke both English and Yup'ik, but was not herself enrolled. Because Bristol's father's blood quantum is one-eighth, hers is one-sixteenth. As a non-enrolled lineal descendant of an enrolled Alaska Native, she is eligible for health benefits under the 1970 Alaska Native Claims Settlement Act. Tuklung was consolidated into the Manokotak Village, a federally recognized tribe.

Palin was raised largely in Wasilla and attended Juneau-Douglas High School when her mother was governor of Alaska. During 2008, she briefly lived in Anchorage with her aunt and uncle where she attended West Anchorage High School. After returning to Wasilla, she attended and then graduated from Wasilla High School in May 2009.

== 2008 Republican National Convention and pregnancy announcement ==
Bristol Palin was first thrown into the national spotlight after Senator John McCain chose Sarah Palin to be his vice presidential running mate in late August 2008; his advisers had already been informed of the 17-year-old's pregnancy, which they believed would be a political liability because she was unmarried. On September 1, 2008, the opening day of the 2008 Republican National Convention, it was publicly announced that Bristol Palin was pregnant and engaged to Levi Johnston, her baby's father. Palin's entire immediate family, along with Johnston, appeared at the convention. McCain's advisers reportedly thought a wedding between Johnston and Palin would boost the waning popularity of the McCain-Palin ticket. Johnston denied claims that he was being pressured into a shotgun wedding, stating, "We were planning on getting married a long time ago with or without the kid. That was the plan from the start."

== Career ==
=== Candie's Foundation ===
Palin first became the subject of media attention when her pregnancy was announced during her mother's vice presidential campaign. In February 2009, she told Fox News that abstinence is "not realistic at all," but that she would like it to become more accepted among people her age.

At age 18 in May 2009, Palin appeared on the Today show and Good Morning America in recognition of the National Day to Prevent Teen Pregnancy. She called for all teens to abstain from sex. Such observance was started by The National Campaign to Prevent Teen and Unplanned Pregnancy. Palin was not employed by the Campaign, nor was she a spokesperson for the organization. Palin said that her abstinence quote of February had been "taken out of context".

Also in May 2009, Palin was named a Teen Pregnancy Prevention Ambassador for the Candie's Foundation, a teen pregnancy prevention organization that is a division of the Candie's clothing brand. Her duties as a paid spokeswoman involved attending town hall meetings, talking about abstinence, public service announcements, and giving interviews on morning talk shows.

In September 2009, Palin formed BSMP, a lobbying, public relations and political consulting services firm. While the initial focus was to be work with Candie's Foundation, BSMP was planned to develop additional clients.

In May 2009, on Good Morning America, Palin said, "Regardless of what I did personally, abstinence is the only 100% foolproof way you can prevent pregnancy." In an interview on Good Morning America in April 2010, she said that "'Pause Before You Play' [a campaign of Candie's] hits a wider range of message, it can mean pause and go get a condom, it can be pause and think about your life, or it could be pause and wait until marriage."

Her role as a spokesperson drew some public criticism. Bonnie Fuller, former editor-in-chief of YM, questioned whether the net effect of Palin's public speaking had glamorized rather than discouraged teen pregnancy, noting that the "picture perfect" imagery of a People magazine spread seemed to make her "the poster girl for teen momhood". That same month, Meghan McCain stated her support for sex education, criticizing Palin's sexual abstinence campaign, saying it was "not realistic for this generation".

In April 2011 the media reported that Palin was paid more than $262,000 by Candie's Foundation for her work in 2009. This level of compensation, which constituted 12% of the foundation's annual budget, was criticized by some commentators as excessive.

In a July 10, 2011, interview with Drew Pinsky, Palin said she does not want to "be named as an abstinence preacher .... I'm not out there saying don't have sex. I hate that kind of stuff. Birth control needs to be used effectively each and every single time if you're gonna be having sex. ... I'm not advocating [abstinence] for everyone else."

On July 13, 2011, Palin had an interview with Christianity Today in which she reaffirmed her stance on abstinence. Discussing whether she still thought that abstinence was unrealistic, as she had said in 2009, she said "that quote was taken out of context. What I am trying to say is it's not realistic for everyone...but for me, my sisters, and my family, I believe that's the right way." Palin still feels that abstinence is the only choice for her and her family.

In 2015, Bristol Palin took to her blog to correct the media regarding what the Candies Organization is and her role within it, stating, "Let's get another thing straight, because I can't tolerate all the talk on this subject. I have never been paid as an "abstinence spokesperson". I was employed by the great people at The Candie's Foundation. They are a teen pregnancy prevention non-profit and I worked for them when I was 18 and 19 — when I could share first hand the challenges of being a teen mother. I know you remember me most from when Mom ran for Vice President. However, I'm not 17 anymore, I am 24. I've been employed at the same doctor's office for over six years now; I own a home; I have a well-rounded, beautiful son. I am pregnant [with my second child.] This is not the ideal situation, but life is important even if it's not in the most absolute ideal circumstance. This is more confirmation on what I've always stood for. I've always been pro-life and I am standing for life now."

=== Paid speeches ===
In May 2010, the media reported that Palin had signed with the company Single Source Speakers, asking between $15,000 and $30,000 for each appearance. She was listed on the company's website as available for conferences, fundraisers, special events and holidays, as well as women's, youth, abstinence, and pro-life programs.

In January 2011, Palin was invited to speak by Washington University in St. Louis as the keynote speaker for "Abstinence in College" at Sexual Responsibility Week. Students protested both the high fee she was to be paid out of student-generated funds and her lack of expertise on abstinence in college. Her appearance was cancelled.

=== Television ===
==== The Secret Life of the American Teenager ====
Palin appeared in an episode of the ABC Family network series The Secret Life of the American Teenager, playing a friend of the fictional character Amy, a 15-year-old who is dealing with an unexpected pregnancy. She filmed the scenes in Los Angeles in March 2010; the episode aired on July 5, 2010. "I like doing speaking engagements and stuff like that," she said, adding, "I don't think I'll be doing any more acting in the future."

==== Dancing with the Stars, season 11 ====
Palin was a competitor on the fall 2010 season of Dancing with the Stars. She was partnered with professional Mark Ballas, who had won with Olympic figure skater Kristi Yamaguchi in Season 6 and with Olympic gymnast Shawn Johnson in Season 8. The season was televised from September through November 2010.

Despite getting the lowest scores from the judges for a number of weeks, Palin and Ballas avoided being eliminated during the season. That attracted media attention and speculation. Questions were raised about the integrity of the public voting process including allegations of fraudulent online voting using multiple e-mail addresses. ABC executives and the show's executive producer, Conrad Green, said that "checks and balances" in the system, including IP-address verification, prevent such voting practices. Green said, "There's nothing in the voting that looks dissimilar to previous seasons". Nonetheless, Green speculated that Palin may have received votes from her mother's fans and other supporters, and from older viewers who had maternal feelings toward her due to her youth and lack of experience. Palin credited her success to the support of her fans who were tuning in each week to see her improvement.

Palin's success on the show attracted death threats and other negative attention. Suspicious white powder was sent to the show; it turned out to be harmless, but security on the show was tightened.

On the final show of the season, Palin and Ballas finished in third place. Before the show, Palin said that winning "would be like a big middle finger out there to all the people out there who hate my mom and hate me". Following the competition, she remarked that she was happy with her third-place finish, that prayer and faith had helped her, and that she had grown as a person.

==== Sarah Palin's Alaska ====
In November 2010, Bristol Palin made an appearance on the TLC travelogue-documentary Sarah Palin's Alaska. She helped the crew on a commercial halibut fishing boat.

==== Music video ====
In October 2010, while competing on Dancing With the Stars Season 11, Palin appeared in a music video for an Alaskan symphony rock band called Static Cycle. The video was shot at the Ice Museum in Chena Hot Springs, Alaska.

==== Bristol Palin: Life's a Tripp ====
Palin's docu-series Life's a Tripp, produced by Associated Television International, premiered on June 19, 2012, in the United States, on Lifetime TV. Lifetime ordered 14 episodes for original broadcast. The series followed Palin as she moved to Los Angeles, then back to Alaska, with two episodes set in Arizona (where her sister Willow was attending beauty school) and one episode in Washington, D.C.

==== Dancing with the Stars, season 15 ====
Palin competed on the all-star Season 15 of DWTS, which began in late September 2012. She was again partnered with Mark Ballas. The two were eliminated in week 4 of the season, in which they had the second-lowest score from the judges.

==== Teen Mom OG ====
In July 2018, Bristol was cast in Teen Mom OG after Farrah Abraham's exit from the show. She quit in April 2019.

=== Real estate ===
In July 2018, Palin began working as a real estate agent with Keller Williams Realty in Austin, Texas.

In late January 2020, Bristol joined the local boutique real estate agency Austin Home Seekers.

== Memoir ==
In June 2011, Palin's memoir, Not Afraid of Life: My Journey So Far, co-authored by Nancy French, was released. In the book, Palin candidly discusses aspects of her personal life, including tensions with the McCain family and losing her virginity. The book received mixed reviews from critics and readers. It reached #21 on The New York Times Best Seller list for hardcover nonfiction.

== Personal life ==
=== Relationships and children ===
In December 2008, two months after her 18th birthday, Palin gave birth to a son, Tripp. The child's father was Palin's high school boyfriend, Levi Johnston. In response to the suggestion that it would have been more prudent to abort her pregnancy and that she only carried it to term because of her mother's views on the issue she responded: 'It doesn't matter what my mom's views are on it. It was my decision.'

Palin and Johnston ended their engagement in March 2009. In November 2009, a custody and child support case was filed in a local Alaska court. Palin asked the court to use pseudonyms for herself and Johnston to keep the normally public proceedings private, arguing that the media attention would not be good for the child. Johnston argued for open proceedings, as the power of the Palin family was relevant to the case, which he claimed he wanted to be decided on the merits, and that he did "not feel protected against Sarah Palin in a closed proceeding".

On December 27, 2009, the judge ruled in favor of Johnston, and it was publicly announced that the pair had been battling for legal custody. Palin tried to win full custody rights and child support consistent with Johnston's income. Johnston sought shared custody and lower child support payments.

In February 2010, a judge ruled that Johnston had to pay back child support, with a hearing set to determine the amount of ongoing support payments.

That month, Palin and her son began living in a condo she had purchased in Anchorage, where she was working at a dermatologist's office and taking business courses at a community college. In July 2010, Palin and Johnston announced that they had reunited and were again engaged, but less than three weeks later, they ended their second engagement. The couple reached an agreement giving primary custody to Palin, and visitation rights and child support responsibility to Johnston.

On March 13, 2015, Palin announced she had become engaged to Dakota Meyer, a former Marine and Medal of Honor recipient. According to Bristol's blog, she first met Meyer in 2014 while filming Amazing America with her mother Sarah Palin in Alaska. On May 18, 2015, Palin's mother announced that the wedding planned for later in the week had been called off.

On June 25, 2015, Palin announced she was pregnant with her second child, and that the father was Meyer. In the announcement she stated the news would come as "a huge disappointment" to her friends and family but said she did not want any sympathy or lectures. Three days later she said that the pregnancy was "not the ideal situation" but was "planned". She said she would not consider abortion and her pregnancy was not in conflict with her work for the Candie's Foundation. She gave birth to a daughter in December 2015. In June 2016, Palin and Meyer married. In December 2016, Palin announced that she was expecting her third child, the second with Meyer. In 2017, she gave birth to a daughter.

On February 13, 2018, Palin and Meyer announced their separation and that Meyer had filed for divorce. Palin and Meyer battled on social media during the divorce. Meyer at one point shared a screenshot that Palin had sent to Sam Boyd, in which Palin called Meyer a coward, and said he did not deserve his Medal of Honor. On August 1, 2018, Palin confirmed that her divorce from Meyer had been finalized.

== Political views ==
In May 2012, Palin criticized then-President Obama's decision to support gay marriage. In December 2013, she spoke out in defense of Duck Dynasty star Phil Robertson following his negative remarks about homosexuality, saying the LGBT community needs to "learn how to respect others' opinions and not just jump to the conclusion that everyone who doesn't support homosexuality and gay marriage is homophobic".

Palin opposed the 2015 name change from Mount McKinley to Denali. In a blog post, Palin wrote that "I've never called the mountain Denali .. and neither does anyone I know." Following her blog post, it was reported that her mother used the name Denali during her farewell speech when resigning from the governorship of Alaska.

== See also ==
- Sarah Palin Channel
