= Wasilla, Alaska =

City in Alaska, United States

Wasilla Benteh
- City
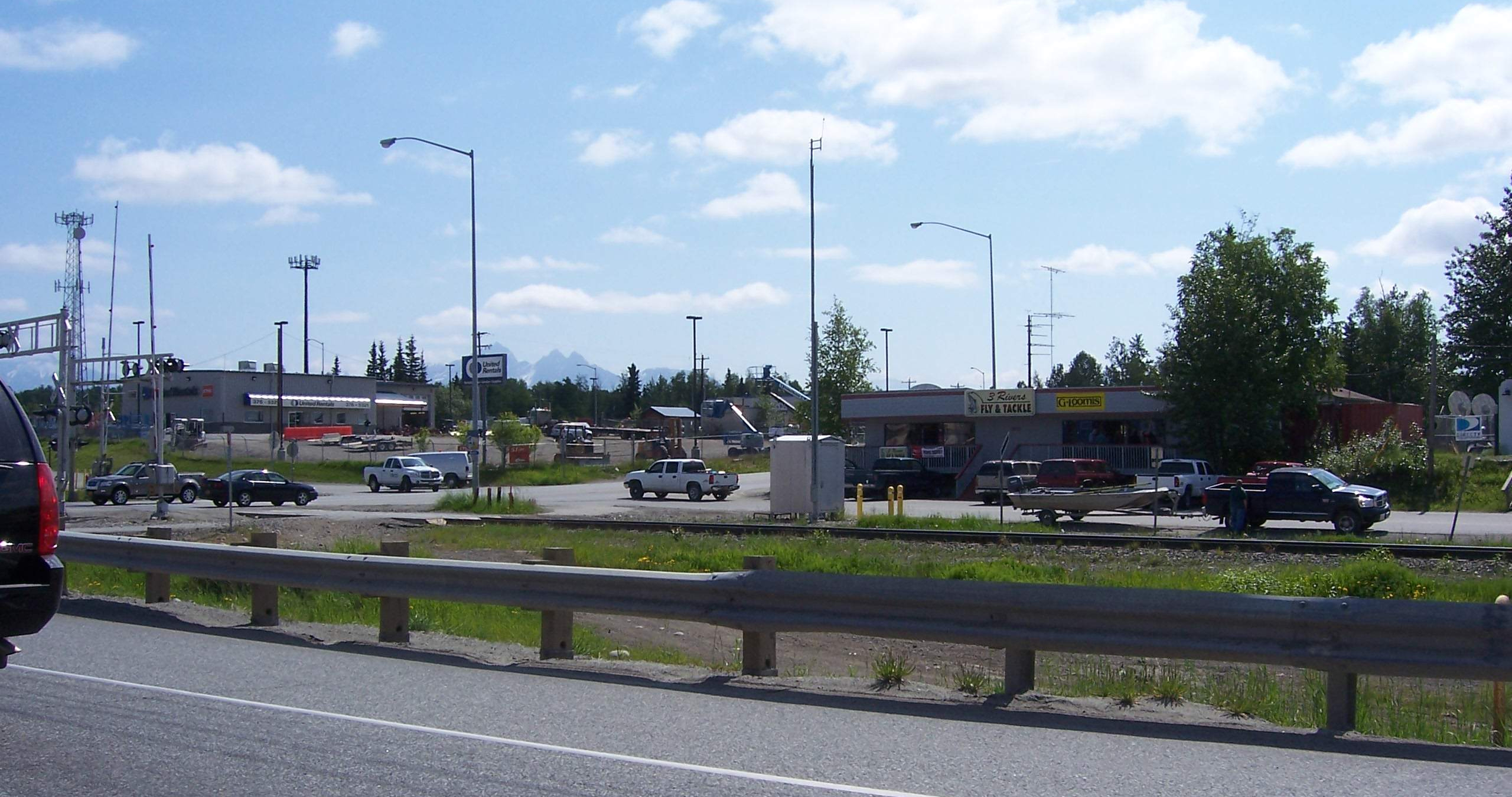
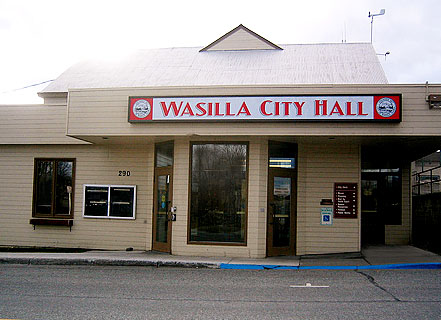
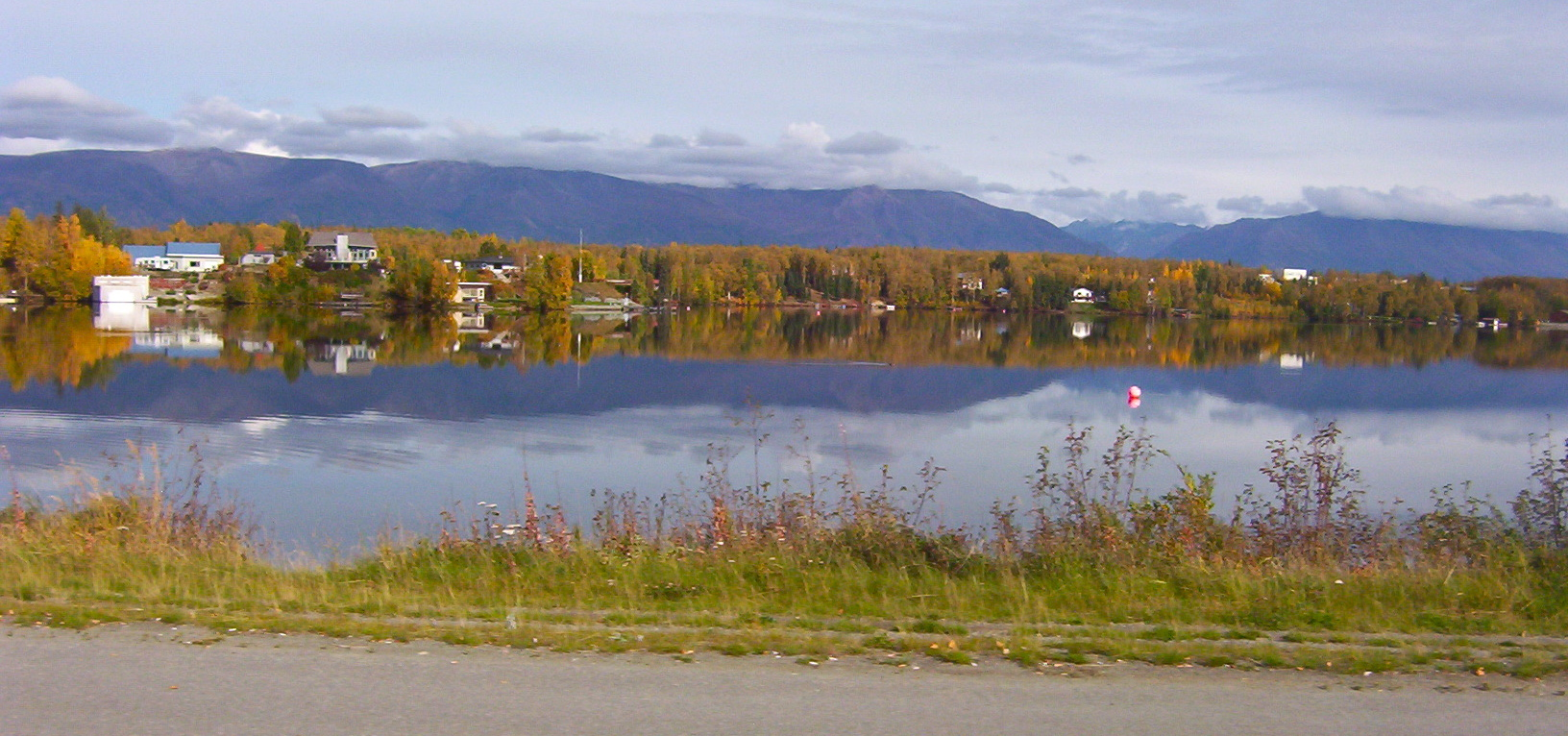
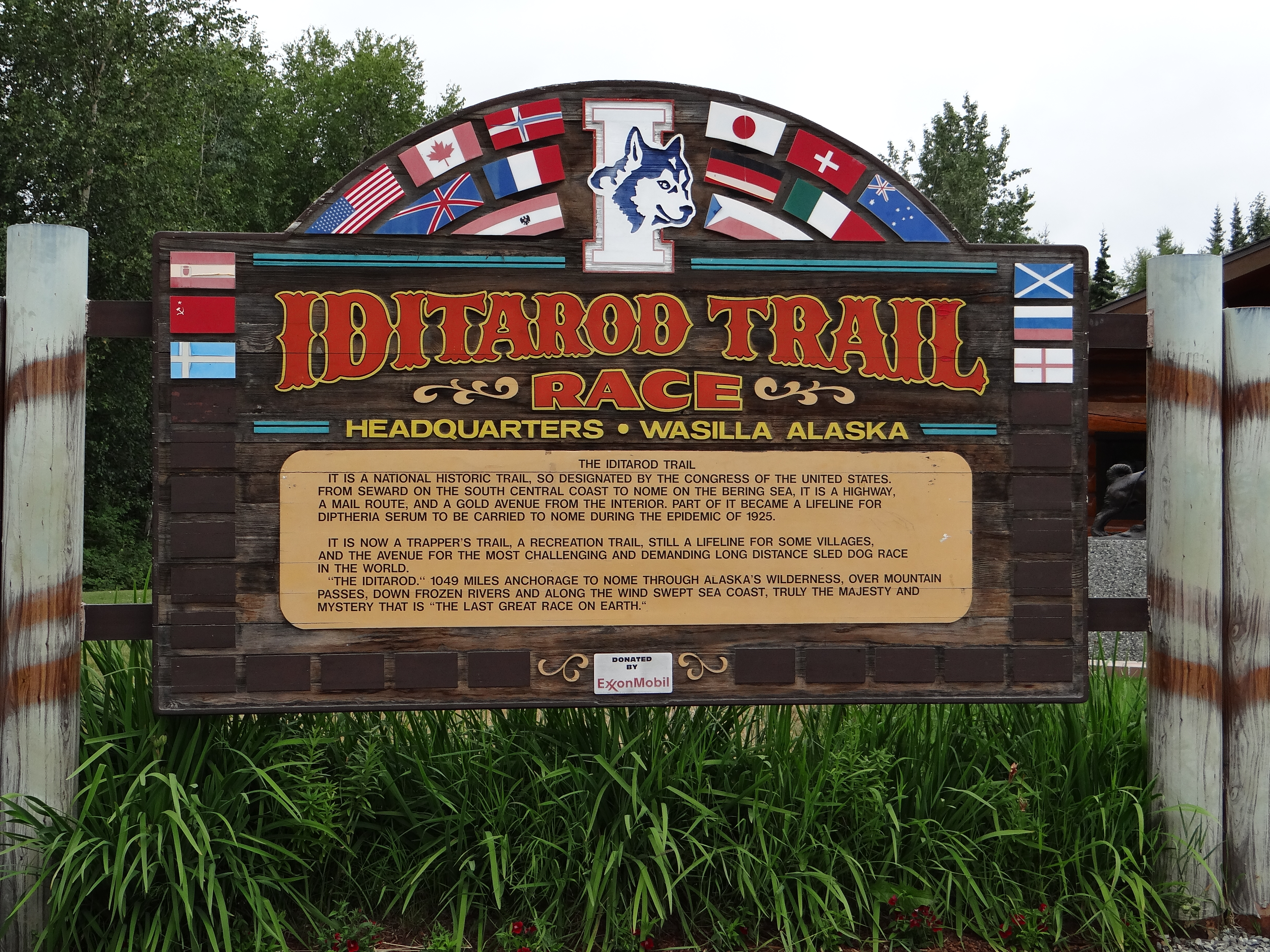
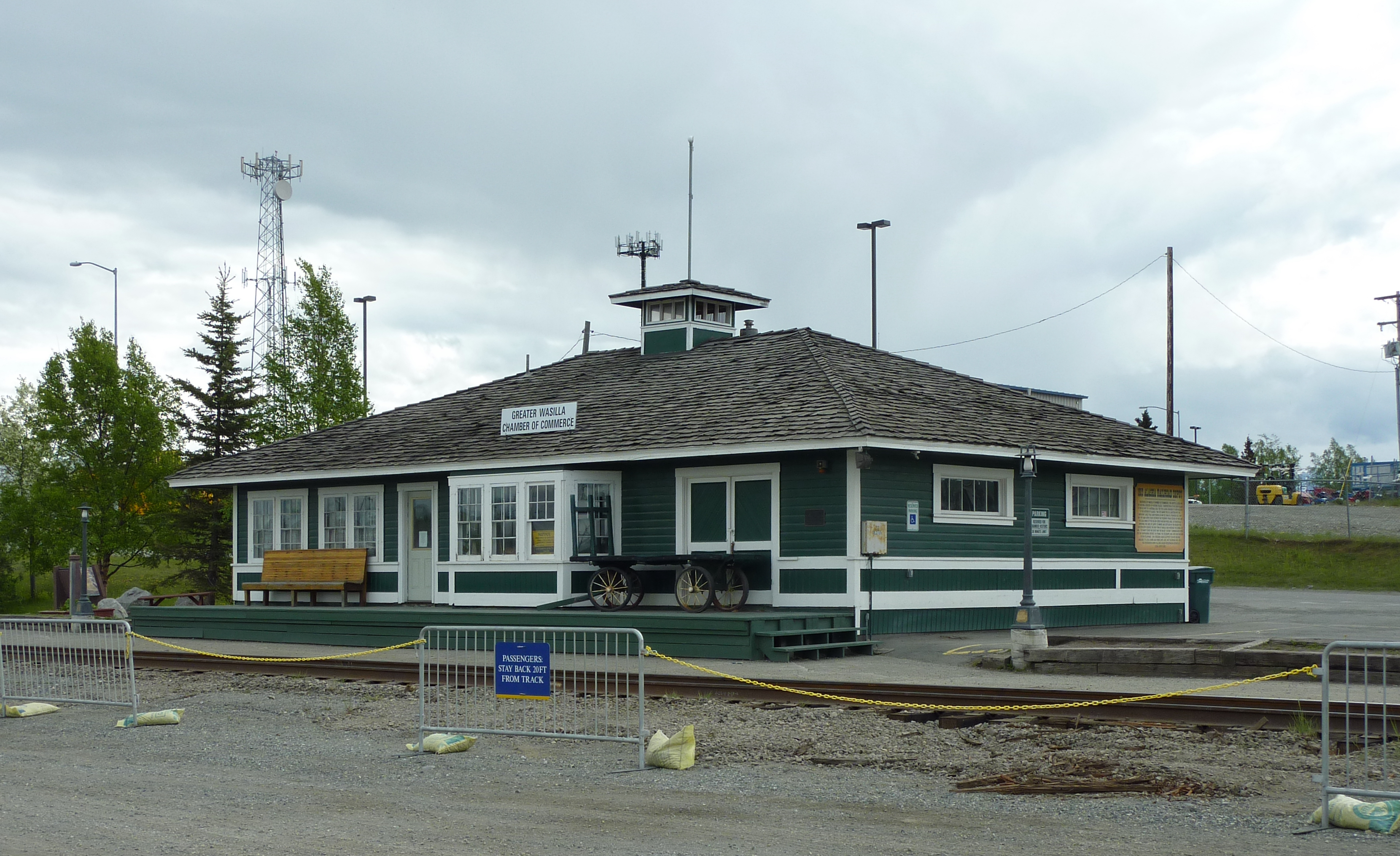
- View of Main Street from the Parks Highway Wasilla City Hall Wasilla Lake seen from the Parks Highway Iditarod headquarters sign Wasilla Depot

- Flag Seal

- Location in Matanuska-Susitna Borough and the state of Alaska.

- Location in Alaska Location in North America
- Coordinates: 61°34′54″N 149°27′9″W
- Country: United States
- State: Alaska
- Borough: Matanuska-Susitna
- Incorporated: February 26, 1974

Government
  - Mayor: Glenda Ledford
  - State senator: David Wilson (R)
  - State rep.: David Eastman (R)

Area
  - Total: 13.13 sq mi (34.01 km^{2})
  - Land: 12.39 sq mi (32.10 km^{2})
  - Water: 0.73 sq mi (1.90 km^{2})
- Elevation: 341 ft (104 m)

Population (2024)
  - Total: 9,054
  - Density: 730.4/sq mi (282.01/km^{2})
- Time zone: UTC−9 (Alaska (AKST))
  - Summer (DST): UTC−8 (AKDT)
- ZIP codes: 99629, 99654, 99687
- Area code: 907
- FIPS code: 02-83080
- GNIS feature ID: 1411788
- Website: cityofwasilla.gov

Wasilla (Denaʼina: Benteh) is a city in Matanuska-Susitna Borough, Alaska, United States, and the fourth-largest city in Alaska. It is located on the northern point of Cook Inlet in the Matanuska-Susitna Valley of the southcentral part of the state. The city's population was 9,054 at the 2020 census, up from 7,831 in 2010. Wasilla is the largest city in the borough and a part of the Anchorage metropolitan area, which had an estimated population of 398,328 in 2020.

Established at the intersection of the Alaska Railroad and Old Carle Wagon Road, the city prospered at the expense of the nearby mining town of Knik. Historically entrepreneurial, the economic base shifted in the 1970s from small-scale agriculture and recreation to support for workers employed in Anchorage or on Alaska's North Slope oilfields and related infrastructure. The George Parks Highway turned the town into a commuter suburb of Anchorage. The headquarters of the Iditarod Trail Sled Dog Race, a popular and significant sporting event in Alaska, is located in Wasilla.

Wasilla gained international attention when Sarah Palin, who served as Mayor of Wasilla before her election as Governor of Alaska, was chosen by John McCain as his running mate for Vice President of the United States in the 2008 United States presidential election.

Wasilla is named after Chief Wasilla, a local Dena'ina chief. Wasilla is the anglicized spelling of the chief's Russian given name, Василий (Vasilij), which corresponds to the English name Basil.

== History ==
Glacial ice sheets covered most of the northern hemisphere during the last glacial period, between 26,500 and 19,000–20,000 years ago, until they disappeared between 10,000 and about 7,000 years ago. Early humans moved through the area and left evidence of their passage. The Matanuska-Susitna valley was eventually settled by the Dena'ina Alaska natives who utilized the fertile lands and fishing opportunities of Cook Inlet. The Dena'ina are one of the eleven sub-groups comprising the indigenous Athabaskan groups extending down Canada's western coast. The area around downtown Wasilla, specifically the creek between Wasilla Lake and Cottonwood Lakes, was known to the Dena'ina as Benteh, which translates as 'among the lakes'. Near the mouth of the Matanuska River, the town of Knik was settled about 1880. In 1900, the Willow Creek Mining District was established to the north and Knik thrived as a mining settlement.

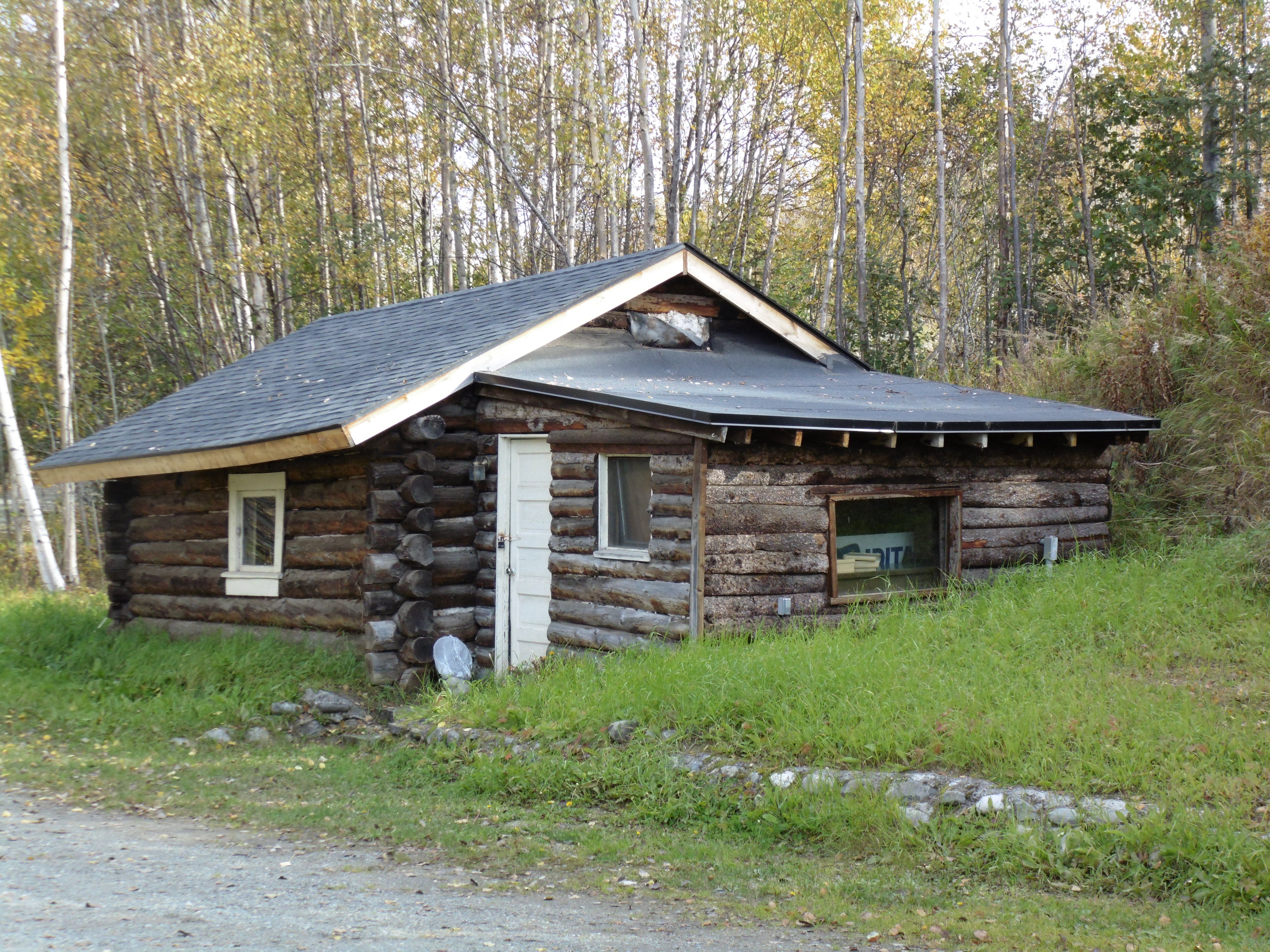
Cabin at the Knik Site

In 1917, the U.S. government planned the Alaska Railroad to intersect the Carle Wagon Road (present Wasilla-Fishhook Road) which connected Knik and the mines. Local businesses and residents rushed to buy land nearby, and Knik declined. Wasilla Station was named for the nearby Wasilla Creek. Local miners used the name "Wasilla Creek", referring to Wassila, a chief of the Dena'ina. There are two sources cited for the name, one being derived from a Dena'ina word meaning "breath of air" while another stating Dena'ina derived it from the Russian name Васи́лий Vasilij. As Knik declined into a ghost town, Wasilla served early fur trappers and miners working the gold fields at Cache Creek and Willow Creek. More than 200 farm families from the Upper Midwest were moved into the Matanuska and Susitna valleys in 1935 as part of a U.S. government program to start a new farming community to counteract this trend; their linguistic influence is still audible in the region.

The area was a supply base for gold mines near Hatcher Pass through World War II. Until construction of the George Parks Highway around 1970, nearby Palmer was the leading city in the Matanuska Valley. Wasilla was at the end of the Palmer-Wasilla highway and the road to Big Lake provided access to land west of Wasilla. The Parks Highway put Wasilla at mile 40–42 of what became the major highway and railroad transportation corridor linking Southcentral Alaska to Interior Alaska. As a result, population growth and community development shifted from the Palmer area to Wasilla and the surrounding area. Wasilla was incorporated as a city in 1974. All non-borough municipalities throughout Alaska are designated cities.

In 1994, a statewide initiative to move Alaska's capital to Wasilla was defeated by a vote of about 116,000 to 96,000. About that time, the Matanuska Valley began to recover from an economic collapse, beginning a sustained boom that involved dramatic population growth, increased local employment, and a boom in residential and commercial real estate development. The local real estate market slowed in 2006. In 2008, suburban growth and dwindling snow forced organizers of the Iditarod Trail Sled Dog Race to bypass Wasilla permanently, due to a warming climate. The race had its start in Wasilla from 1973 to 2002, the year when reduced snow cover forced a "temporary" change to Willow.

== Geography ==
According to the United States Census Bureau, the city has an area of 12.4 square miles (32.2 km^{2} (12.4 sq mi). Of that, 11.7 square miles (30.4 km^{2}) is land and 0.7 square miles (1.8 km^{2}) (5.64%) is water.

Located near Wasilla Lake and Lake Lucille, Wasilla is one of two towns in the Matanuska Valley. The community surrounds Mi. 39–46 of the George Parks Highway, roughly 43 mi (69 km) by highway northeast of Anchorage. Nearly one third of the people of Wasilla drive the 40-minute commute to work in Anchorage every day. Six miles to the southeast is Mount POW/MIA.

=== Climate ===
Wasilla has a climate similar to that of Anchorage, classified as a subarctic climate (Dfc) by Köppen-Geiger climate classification, although with slightly warmer daytime maxima and colder nighttime minima due to its inland location. On average, over the course of the entire year, there are 30–31 days of sub-0 °F (−17.8 °C) lows, 37–38 days of 70 °F (21.1 °C)+ highs, and 1.4 days of 80 °F (26.7 °C)+ highs. The average annual precipitation is 17 inches (430 mm), with 52 inches (1.32 m) of snowfall.

Climate data for Wasilla, Alaska
Month	Jan	Feb	Mar	Apr	May	Jun	Jul	Aug	Sep	Oct	Nov	Dec	Year
Mean daily maximum °F (°C)	23.7 (−4.6)	28.6 (−1.9)	36.9 (2.7)	49.1 (9.5)	61.1 (16.2)	67.7 (19.8)	69.6 (20.9)	67.4 (19.7)	58.6 (14.8)	42.9 (6.1)	28.2 (−2.1)	25.7 (−3.5)	46.7 (8.2)
Mean daily minimum °F (°C)	8.2 (−13.2)	11.8 (−11.2)	18.8 (−7.3)	28.2 (−2.1)	36.7 (2.6)	44.5 (6.9)	49.2 (9.6)	46.8 (8.2)	39.7 (4.3)	26.9 (−2.8)	13.2 (−10.4)	10.1 (−12.2)	27.9 (−2.3)
Average precipitation inches (mm)	0.8 (20)	0.9 (23)	0.5 (13)	0.7 (18)	0.8 (20)	1.6 (41)	2.5 (64)	2.7 (69)	2.7 (69)	1.8 (46)	1.2 (30)	1.0 (25)	17.2 (440)
Average snowfall inches (cm)	8.4 (21)	8.9 (23)	5.8 (15)	2.5 (6.4)	0.1 (0.25)	0 (0)	0 (0)	0 (0)	0 (0)	4.7 (12)	8.7 (22)	12.8 (33)	52.1 (132)
Source: NOAA (1981–2010 normals), Weatherbase (precip, snow)

== Demographics ==
Historical population
Census	Pop.	Note	%±
1930	51		—
1940	96		88.2%
1950	97		1.0%
1960	112		15.5%
1970	300		167.9%
1980	1,559		419.7%
1990	4,028		158.4%
2000	5,469		35.8%
2010	7,831		43.2%
2020	9,054		15.6%
U.S. Decennial Census

=== Racial and ethnic composition ===
Wasilla city, Alaska – Racial composition
Race (NH = Non-Hispanic)	2020	2010	2000	1990	1980
White alone (NH)	72.3% (6,543)	81.3% (6,368)	83.9% (4,586)	91.4% (3,680)	92.9% (1,449)
Black alone (NH)	1.4% (129)	1.3% (98)	0.5% (25)	0.6% (24)	0.4% (6)
American Indian alone (NH)	6.6% (597)	5% (388)	5% (276)	5.2% (209)	5.3% (82)
Asian alone (NH)	2% (178)	2.1% (164)	1.3% (70)	0.8% (32)	
Pacific Islander alone (NH)	0.7% (62)	0.2% (18)	0.1% (7)		
Other race alone (NH)	0.8% (74)	0.2% (13)	0.4% (22)	0.1% (4)	
Multiracial (NH)	10.4% (944)	5.7% (449)	5.2% (282)	—	—
Hispanic/Latino (any race)	5.8% (527)	4.3% (333)	3.7% (201)	2% (79)	1.4% (22)

Wasilla first appeared on the 1930 U.S. Census as an unincorporated village of 51 residents. Of these, all 51 were White. It has returned in every successive census and formally incorporated in 1974.

=== 2020 census ===
As of the 2020 census, Wasilla had a population of 9,054. The median age was 34.3 years. 26.9% of residents were under the age of 18 and 14.6% of residents were 65 years of age or older. For every 100 females there were 94.1 males, and for every 100 females age 18 and over there were 89.6 males age 18 and over.

92.8% of residents lived in urban areas, while 7.2% lived in rural areas.

There were 3,525 households in Wasilla, of which 34.3% had children under the age of 18 living in them. Of all households, 40.7% were married-couple households, 19.8% were households with a male householder and no spouse or partner present, and 31.1% were households with a female householder and no spouse or partner present. About 31.0% of all households were made up of individuals and 13.9% had someone living alone who was 65 years of age or older.

There were 3,869 housing units, of which 8.9% were vacant. The homeowner vacancy rate was 1.5% and the rental vacancy rate was 8.2%.

The most reported ancestries in 2020 were:

- German (16.2%)
- English (14.6%)
- Irish (13.6%)
- Scottish (4%)
- Italian (3.3%)
- Mexican (3.3%)
- Norwegian (3.3%)
- French (3.3%)
- Russian (2.5%)
- Swedish (2.2%)

Racial composition as of the 2020 census
Race	Number	Percent
White	6,761	74.7%
Black or African American	134	1.5%
American Indian and Alaska Native	621	6.9%
Asian	178	2.0%
Native Hawaiian and Other Pacific Islander	74	0.8%
Some other race	163	1.8%
Two or more races	1,123	12.4%
Hispanic or Latino (of any race)	527	5.8%

=== 2000 census ===
As of the census of 2000, there were 5,469 people (up from 4,028 in 1990), 1,979 households, and 1,361 families residing in the city. The population density was 466.8 people per square mile (180.2 people/km^{2}). There were 2,119 housing units at an average density of 180.9 units per square mile (69.8 units/km^{2}). The racial makeup of the city was 85.5% White, 0.6% Black or African American, 5.3% Native American, 1.3% Asian, 0.1% Pacific Islander, 1.3% from other races, and 5.9% from two or more races. Hispanic or Latino of any race were 3.7% of the population.

There were 1,979 households, out of which 43.5% had children under the age of 18 living with them, 50.2% were married couples living together, 13.8% had a female householder with no husband present, and 31.2% were non-families. 23.5% of all households were made up of individuals, and 6.8% had someone living alone who was 65 years of age or older. The average household size was 2.76 and the average family size was 3.27.

In the community of Wasilla, the age distribution of the population shows 33.6% under the age of 18, 10.0% from 18 to 24, 30.7% from 25 to 44, 19.0% from 45 to 64, and 6.7% who were 65 years of age or older. The median age was 30. For every 100 females, there were 99.5 males; for every 100 females age 18 and over, there were 95.0 males.

The median income for a household in Wasilla was $48,226, and the median income for a family was $53,792. Males had a median income of $41,332 versus $29,119 for females. The per capita income for the town was $21,127. About 5.7% of families and 9.6% of the population were below the poverty line, including 12.6% of those under the age of 18 and 9.7% of those 65 and older.

== Income and poverty ==
According to the United States Census Bureau, the median household income in Wasilla from 2010 to 2014 was $62,622, with a per capita income of $28,704 and a poverty rate of 11.2% in the same year. The estimated rent burden in Wasilla was 31.7% (2011).

== Economy ==
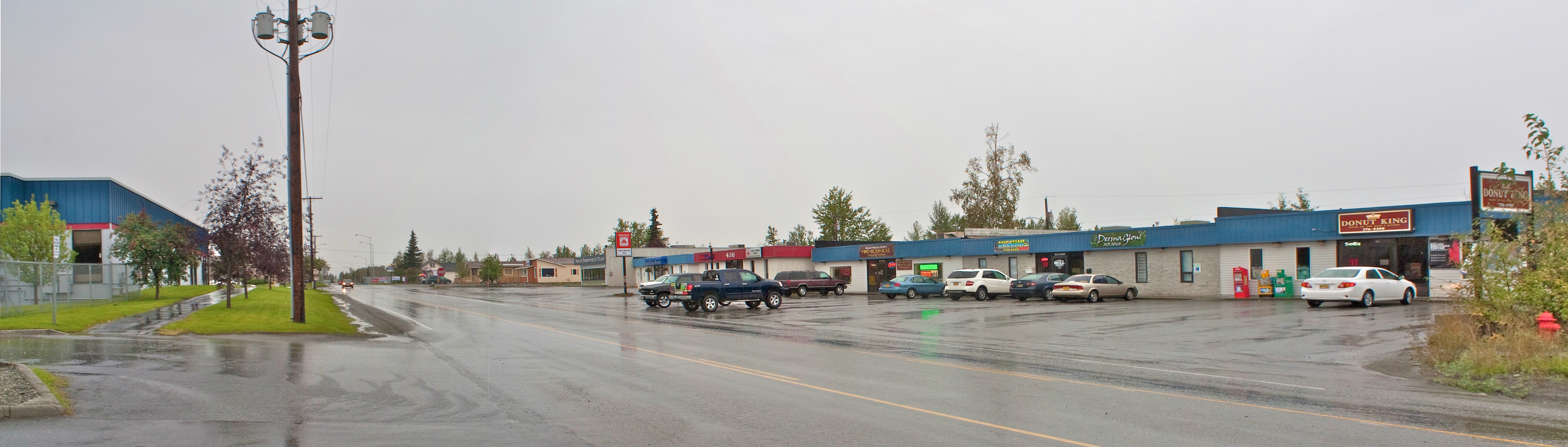
Panoramic view of Main Street looking south as it passes through a smaller business district than what is found along the Parks Highway

Wasilla began as a transportation logistics and trade center serving natural resource extraction (mining, trapping & timber) followed by small-scale agricultural activity circa 1935; around 1975, construction of the Parks Highway substantially reduced travel time to Anchorage (approximately 43 miles away), encouraging the transition to a satellite bedroom community where many workers commute to Anchorage for employment. Local service employment has increased in recent years.

About 35 percent of the Wasilla workforce commutes to Anchorage. The local economy is diverse, and residents are employed in a variety of city, borough, state, federal, retail and professional service positions. Tourism, agriculture, wood products, steel, and concrete products are part of the economy. One hundred and twenty area residents hold commercial fishing permits; commercial fishermen work seasonally in Lower Cook Inlet and distant Bristol Bay or the Gulf of Alaska and Prince William Sound (there are no commercial fisheries in Upper Cook Inlet).

== Recreation ==
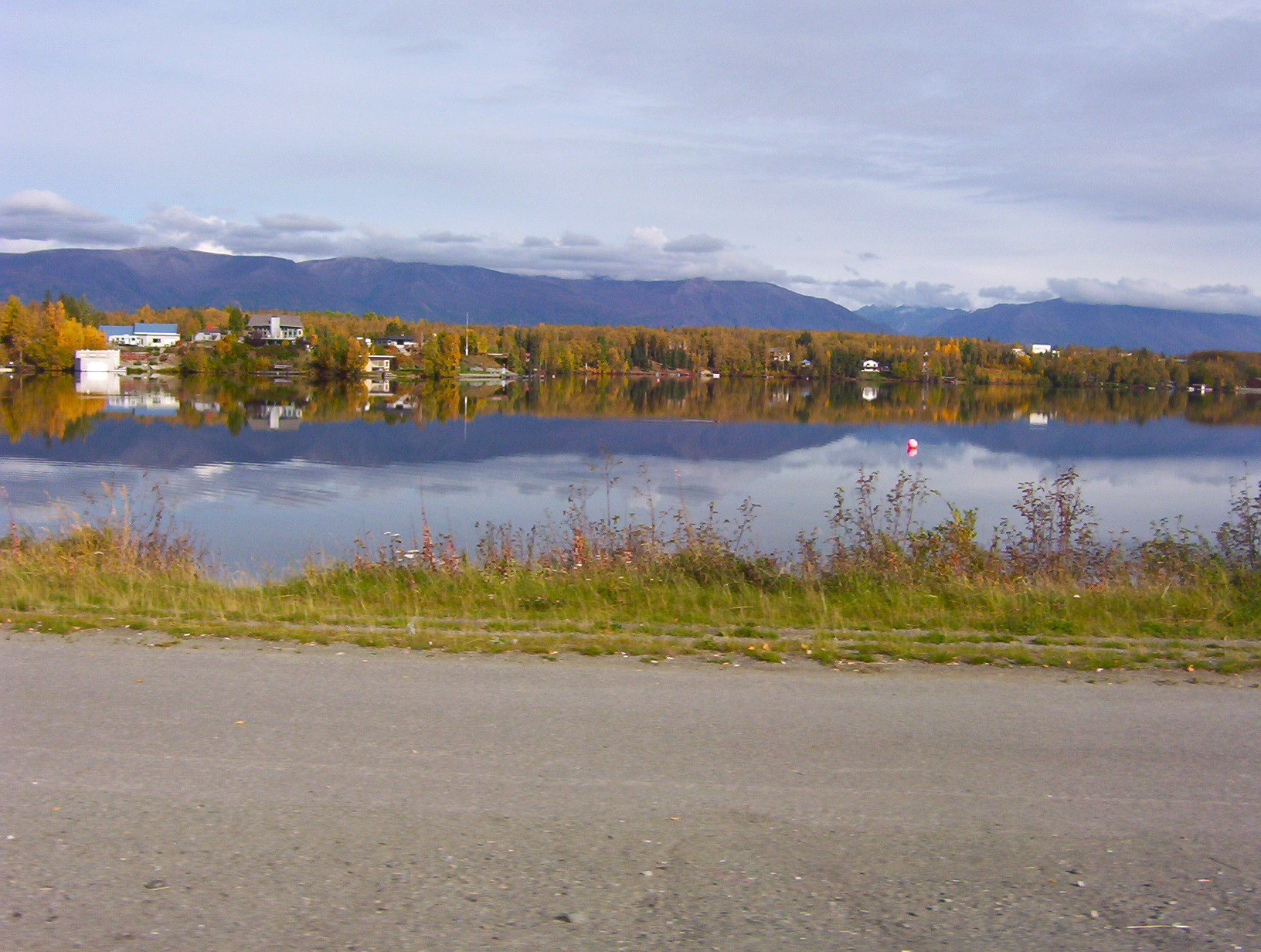
The southern and western reaches of Wasilla Lake (shown here) are within city limits. Nearby Lake Lucille is also within city limits. Both lakes are easily accessible from the Parks Highway and various city streets.

The Museum of Alaska Transportation and Industry in Wasilla was established in 1967, "to give a home to the transportation and industrial remnants and to tell the stories of the people and the machines that opened Alaska to exploration and growth."

In 2010, the Menard Center lost a tenant when the Arctic Predators did not play as a member of the Indoor Football League.

== Government ==
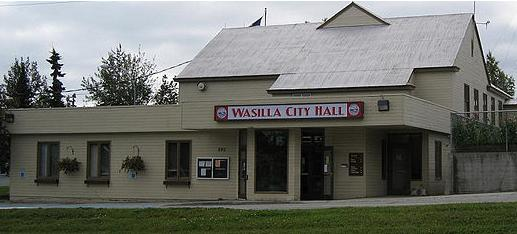
Wasilla City Hall, August 2008

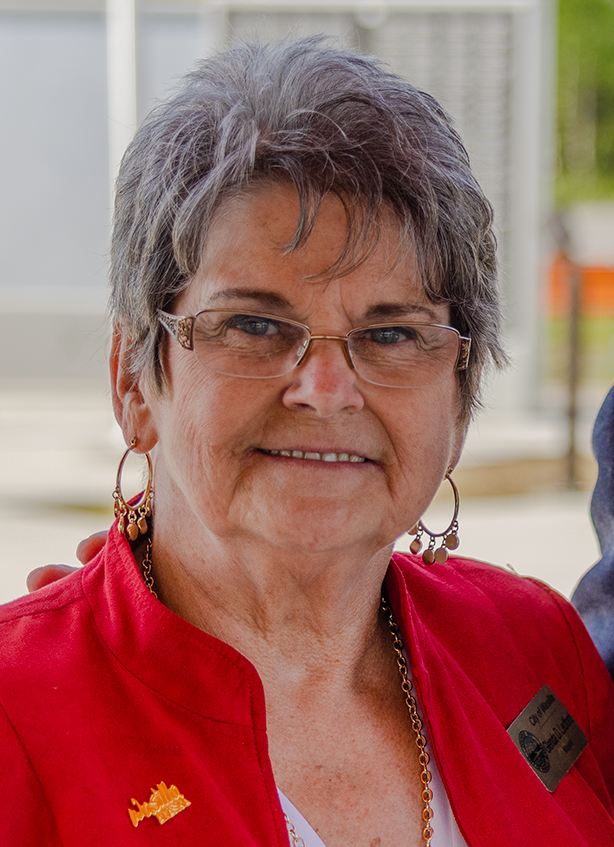
Glenda Ledford, shown attending Wasilla's Memorial Day observance in 2022, has served as the city's mayor since 2020.

The Wasilla City Council is the city's legislature. It enacts laws and policy statements, sets the property tax rate, and approves the budget and funds for city services. It has six members, elected at-large by Wasilla residents for three year terms. The mayor is elected separately. A run-off election is held if no candidate for mayor receives more than 40% of the votes cast. Run-off elections are not held for city council seats. All positions are part-time.

While Wasilla has an Alaska State Troopers presence, Wasilla falls under the jurisdiction of the Wasilla Police Department, founded in 1993, and employs 25 sworn officers. Emergency services and fire protection are provided by the Matanuska-Susitna Borough under Central Mat-Su Fire Department.

== Education and health ==
Wasilla is served by the Matanuska-Susitna Borough School District. It has five high schools:

- Burchell High School
- Mat-Su Career and Technical High School
- MidValley High School
- Wasilla High School
- Colony High School

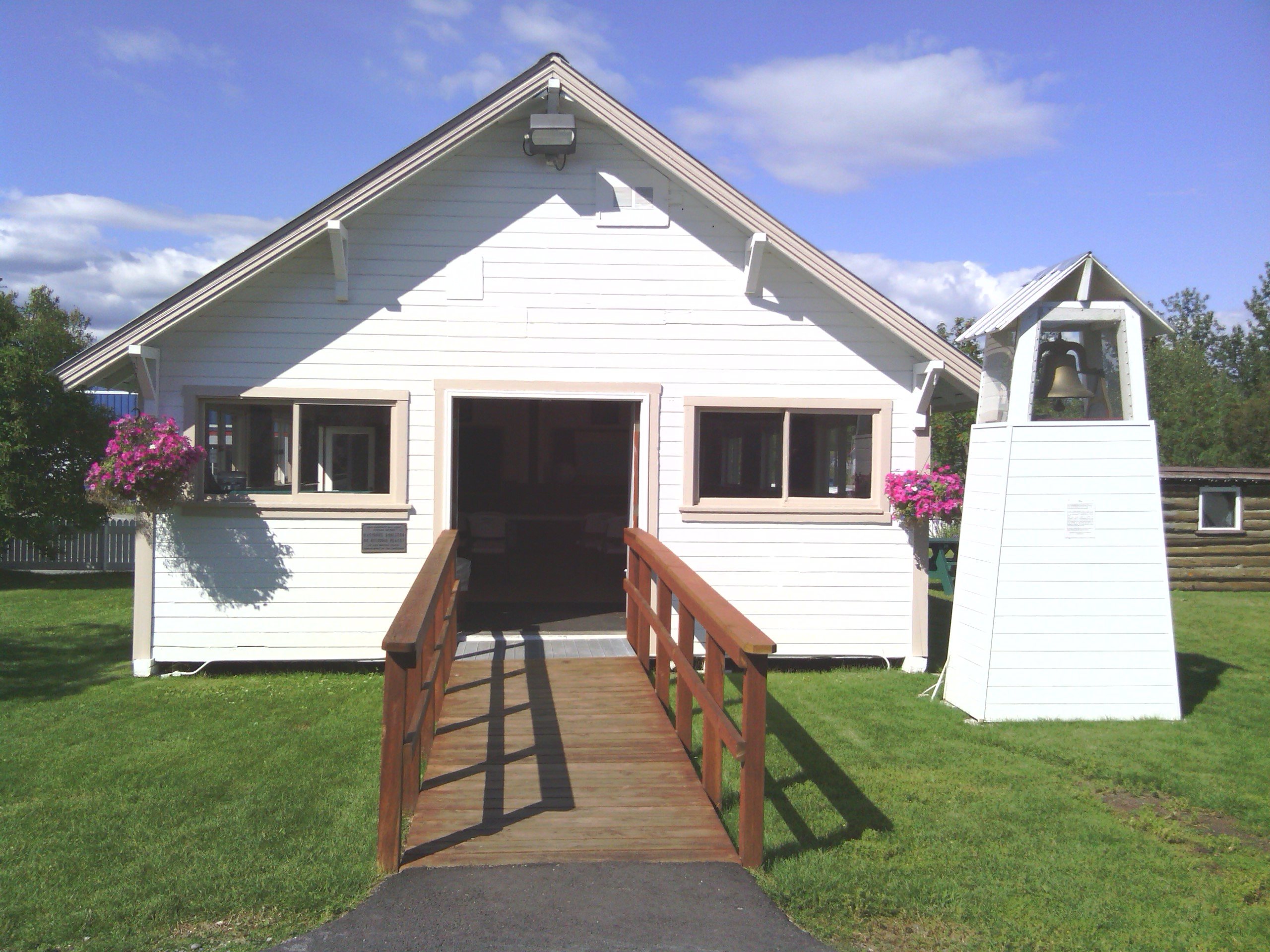
The original, one-room Wasilla Elementary School

There are also career training and technical colleges in Wasilla.

Mat-Su Regional Medical Center opened in January 2006. It is outside the city limits halfway between Wasilla and its twin town of Palmer.

== Transportation ==
The George Parks Highway in conjunction with the Glenn Highway connects Wasilla to Anchorage and communities on the Kenai Peninsula. The Parks also links the Matanuska Valley northward to the rest of the state and Canada. The Alaska Railroad serves Wasilla.

The city-owned Wasilla Airport, with a paved 3,700-foot (1,100 m) runway, provides air taxi services. The airport was formerly located in the city center before moving to a site on the western edge of the city during the 1980s. An anti-moose mat was installed around the runway in 2005, giving a light shock to animals which might otherwise wander into the path of moving aircraft. The old airport site is currently home to a city park. Wasilla also has eight public-use seaplane bases located on area lakes. Private-use air facilities registered with the FAA include 43 land-based airstrips, eight additional seaplane bases, two heliports and one STOLport.

== Parks ==
The City of Wasilla operates several parks, including a large campground, boat launch, and dog park on Lake Lucille, Newcomb Park on Wasilla Lake, and other parks, playgrounds, and a skate park. Alaska State Parks operates the Finger Lake State Recreation Area, and the Little Susitna River Public Use Area, which features a large campground, river access, and is the gateway to a 300,800 acres (121,700 ha) public game reserve.

== In the media ==
Wasilla is one of five cities featured in the first season of the ABC reality series Emergency Call, which chronicles real-life 9-1-1 calls and the operator-dispatchers who handle them. Wasilla was also the setting of the short-lived MTV reality show Slednecks.

== Notable people ==
- Chad Carpenter (born c. 1968), cartoonist, creator of the comic strip Tundra
- Larry Csonka (born 1946), former Miami Dolphins Pro Bowl Running Back, NFL Hall of Famer
- David Eastman (born 1981), state legislator
- John Gourley (born 1981), frontman of American band Portugal.The Man
- Lyda Green (1938–2023), former president of the Alaska Senate
- Levi Johnston (born 1990), media personality, former fiancé of Bristol Palin
- Lisa Kelly (born 1980), of the History Channel program Ice Road Truckers
- Vic Kohring (1958–2022), state legislator implicated in the Alaska political corruption probe
- Ryan McDonough (1978–2025), cardiologist and member of the Alaska State Medical Board
- Tom Mechler (born 1956), former chairman of the Republican Party of Texas
- Jeremy Morlock, a U.S. Army soldier who murdered three civilians in Afghanistan
- Dorothy G. Page (1921–1989), hailed by some as the "mother" of the Iditarod Trail sled dog race
- Members of the Palin family:
  - Sarah Palin (born 1964), former mayor of Wasilla, former Alaska governor, and 2008 Republican vice presidential candidate
  - Todd Palin (born 1964), professional snowmobile racer, four-time Iron Dog race champion, former husband of Sarah Palin
  - Bristol Palin (born 1990), Teen Abstinence Ambassador for the Candie's Foundation, daughter of Todd and Sarah Palin
