= Wasilla High School =

Coordinates: 61.58861°N 149.42861°W

Location
- 701 East Bogard Road; Wasilla, Alaska 99654; United States

Information
- School type: Public secondary school
- Motto: To Strive, To Seek, To Find and Not To Yield!
- School district: Matanuska-Susitna Borough School District
- CEEB code: 020155
- Principal: Jason Marvel
- Teaching staff: 48.00
- Grades: 9–12
- Enrollment: 859 (2023-2024)
- Student to teacher ratio: 17.90
- Campus type: Suburban
- Colors: Red and white
- Mascot: Warrior
- Website: www.matsuk12.us/whs

Wasilla High School (WHS) is a public secondary school in Wasilla, Alaska, United States, serving students in grades 9–12. The school is part of the Matanuska-Susitna Borough School District, with admission based primarily on the locations of students' homes.

The school earned widespread media attention in 2008 following former pupil Governor Sarah Palin's nomination as the Republican vice-presidential running mate to John McCain in the 2008 United States presidential election.

== Academics ==
As of February 22, 2018, there are fifteen AP classes offered. WHS also participates in the University of Alaska Anchorage's Tech Prep program, which allows students to receive college credit for automotive technology classes.

== Athletics ==
WHS is a 4A member school of the Alaska School Activities Association (ASAA), the governing body for high school athletics in Alaska. The fall sports offered at WHS are cross country running, football, cheerleading (football), swimming, and volleyball. The winter sports offered are basketball, hockey, Native Youth Olympics, cross-country skiing, cheerleading (basketball), and wrestling. The spring sports offered are baseball, soccer, softball, and track and field.

== Mascot ==
Former Wasilla mascot

Wasilla High School's mascot is the Warrior, a Native American. Following the murder of George Floyd, a petition to change the mascot was circulated by a former student who called the mascot "racially obtuse". The administration of Wasilla High announced they would work with the Knik Tribal Council to "design a more culturally appropriate WHS Alaskan Native warrior to reflect the indigenous people of our area." With input from the local Knik Tribe the prior logo, a Lakota Sioux warrior, was replaced with an image of the Dena’ina Athabascan Chief Wasilla, the community’s namesake.

== Environmental projects ==
In 2000, Wasilla High School received a $5000 environmental education grant from the Environmental Protection Agency. The school worked in partnership with local government agencies and businesses to raise awareness of groundwater issues in the school and the community. Then they worked on many projects to tell their community to save the environment.

== Extracurricular activities ==
Close-Up is a program that takes students to study in Washington D.C. for one week. The Sister School Exchange program is a one-week student exchange program between students in urban and rural Alaska.

== Graduation rate ==
A Johns Hopkins University study named Wasilla High School as a "dropout factory". Wasilla's dropout rate was 6.5 percent in 2006, a number that was much higher than most of the schools in the Mat-Su district. The study was conducted by finding the difference between a class with 400 freshman students which ended up with 260 seniors four years later. However, the Johns Hopkins study did not follow specific students. If a student started school at Wasilla High and then graduated from another high school, the study would consider him or her a dropout. Matanuska-Susitna Borough School District has an open enrollment policy and it is fairly common for students to transfer from one school to another if their parents find new jobs in other areas. School Board President Sarah Welton said that the study was flawed and that the false impression made on others in the country would be unfortunate. Only 58 percent of incoming freshmen graduate as seniors.

In the spring of 2009, the students of Wasilla High School took a qualifying exam for graduation. The subjects tested were math, writing, and reading. In math, 87 percent of Wasilla's students received a proficient score. Statewide, 80.2 percent of tenth graders received a proficient score. In writing, 78.1 percent of Wasilla's students received a proficient score. Statewide, 78.8 percent of tenth graders received a proficient score. In reading, 94.1 percent of Wasilla's students received a proficient score. Statewide, 90.0 percent of tenth graders received a proficient score. As of the 2008–2009 school year, Wasilla's graduation rate is 77.8 percent, higher than the statewide graduation rate of 67.6 percent.

In September 2008, Wasilla High had 1300 students.

== Notable students and faculty ==
- John Gourley, lead singer of the indie band Portugal. The Man
- Levi Johnston, former fiancé of Bristol Palin; left after his junior year, never graduated from Wasilla High
- Bristol Palin, daughter of Sarah Palin
- Sarah Palin, former Governor of Alaska and former Republican vice presidential nominee
- Todd Palin, husband of Sarah Palin and a former champion snowmobile racer
- Richard Russell, Horizon Air employee at Seattle-Tacoma International Airport who stole and crashed a plane into Ketron Island, Washington resulting in his death in 2018.
