= List of hospitals in Alaska =

List of notable hospitals in Alaska

This is a list of hospitals in Alaska (U.S. state), sorted by hospital name. Alaska is one of only 5 states in the US that does not have a Level I trauma center.

== Hospitals ==
The American Hospital Directory lists 28 hospitals in Alaska.

- Alaska Native Medical Center, Anchorage
- Alaska Regional Hospital, Anchorage
- Bartlett Regional Hospital, Juneau
- Bassett Army Community Hospital, Fort Wainwright
- Central Peninsula General Hospital, Soldotna
- Cordova Community Medical Center, Cordova
- Elmendorf AFB Hospital, Anchorage
- Fairbanks Memorial Hospital, Fairbanks
- Kanakanak Hospital, Dillingham
- Maniilaq Health Center, Kotzebue
- Mat-Su Regional Medical Center, Palmer
- Mt. Edgecumbe Medical Center, Sitka
- Northstar Hospital, Anchorage
- Norton Sound Regional Hospital, Nome
- PeaceHealth Ketchikan Medical Center, Ketchikan
- Petersburg Medical Center, Petersburg
- Providence Alaska Medical Center, Anchorage
- Providence Kodiak Island Medical Center, Kodiak
- Providence Seward Medical and Care Center, Seward
- St. Elias Specialty Hospital, Anchorage
- Samuel Simmonds Memorial Hospital, Utqiaġvik
- Sitka Community Hospital, Sitka
- South Peninsula Hospital, Homer
- Wrangell Medical Center, Wrangell
- Yukon-Kuskokwim Delta Regional Hospital, Bethel
