= Iron Dog =

Off-road snowmobile race across Alaska

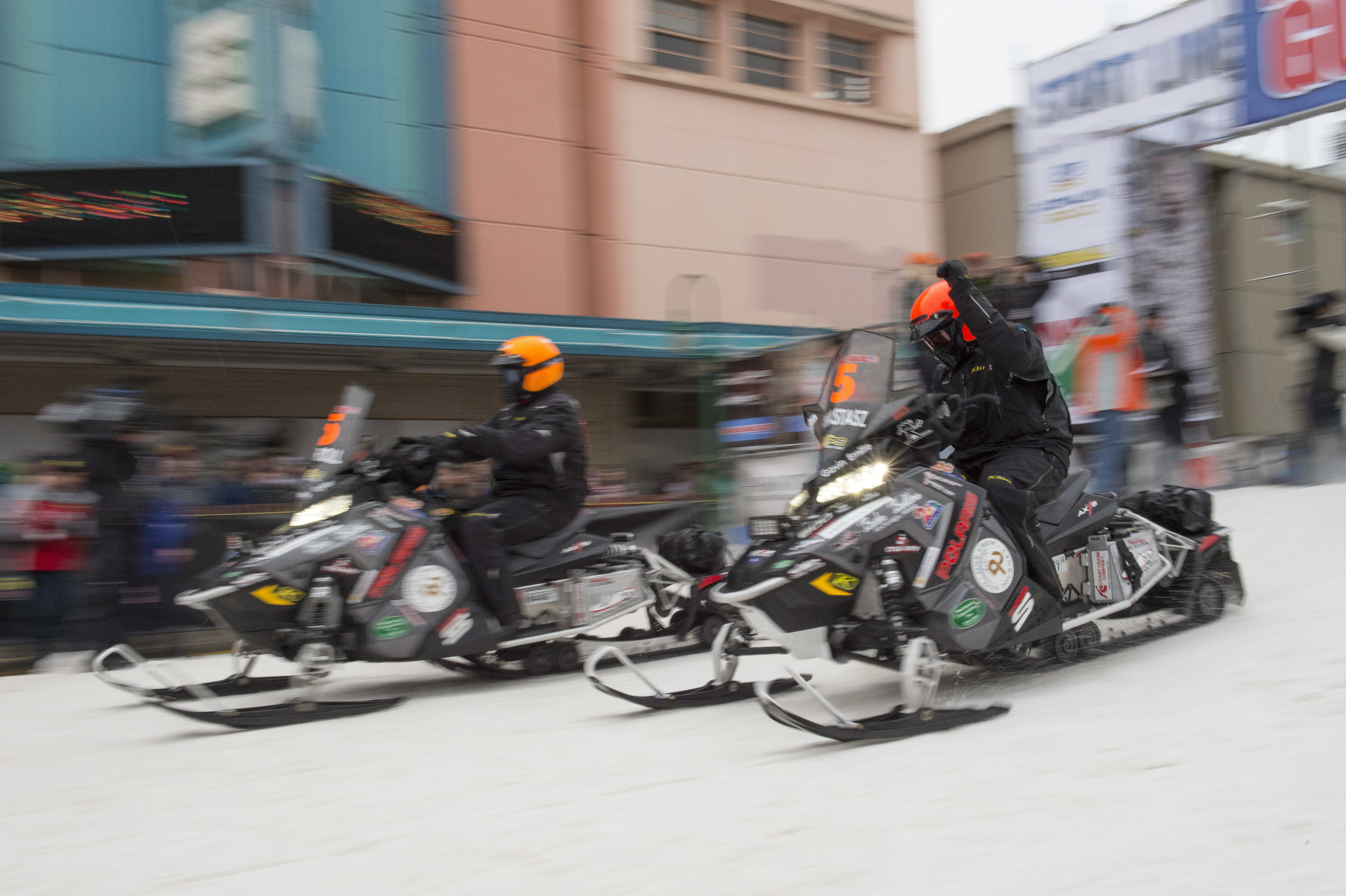
Participants in the 2015 Iron Dog

The Iron Dog or Iron Dog Race, originally known as the Iron Dog Gold Rush Classic and between 2000 and 2009 for sponsorship reasons as the Tesoro Iron Dog, is an off-road snowmobile race across Alaska, USA. It normally starts on a Sunday in mid-February. At 2,031 miles (3,269 km), it is the longest high speed cross-country snowmachine race in the world. A record forty-two teams entered the 2008 event. In 2013 the total purse was US $210,500, with $50,000 awarded to the winners.

== Course ==
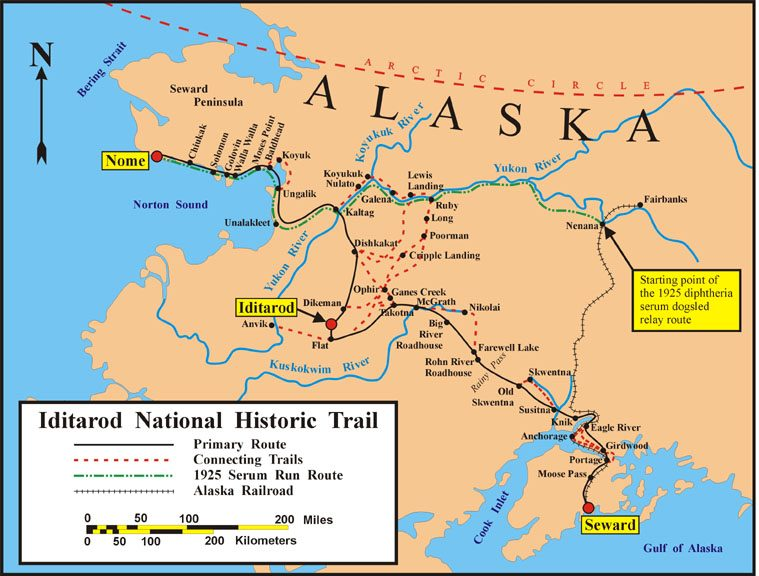
Iditarod Trail

The event began in 1984 as a 1,000-mile (1,600 km) race in Alaska from Big Lake near Wasilla to Nome. It was approximately doubled to 2,000 miles (3,200 km) at the 10th annual race in 1994. The race route now follows parts of the Iditarod Trail, the route of the Iditarod Trail Sled Dog Race. It starts at Big Lake and follows the main trail and its connecting trails until it hits to the Yukon River at Ruby. It follows the river to Kaltag before it heads to the Norton Sound on the Bering Sea at Unalakleet and it follows the coast to Nome. Then it returns along the same path in the reverse order to Ruby, where it diverges off its original path by following the Yukon River and its tributary the Tanana River until the competitors finish in Fairbanks. The route changes from time to time; total length has been 1,971 to 2,031 miles since 1993, extended to 2,031 miles in 2011. As of 2013 the fastest time since 1994 was 35 hours 39 minutes 56 seconds by Marc McKenna & Dusty VanMeter on a Ski-Doo in 2012, although this figure is dependent upon route length and conditions rather than being a straightforward record; fastest times have exceeded 71 hours. The most current record time was set in 2016 by Tyler Aklestad and Tyson Johnson on Ski-Doo snowmobiles with a time of 17 hours 32 minutes and 44 seconds.

== Safety ==
Races are typically run in temperatures well below freezing, and -20 °F (-30 °C) to -50 °F (-45 °C) air temperatures are common without taking wind chill into effect. Some drivers apply duct tape to their faces to protect against frostbite. The machines are equipped with tall windshields for protection from the cold.

Drivers compete in two-driver, two-sled teams for their safety since they travel through remote areas of Alaska. Teams are required to take three six-hour breaks between Nome and Tanana. They also take a 42-hour break in Nome to recuperate before they start making their return. Sleds are impounded during the break, ensuring that they rest since they are not able to work on their sleds. As of 2016 the race had never had a fatality, although there had been close calls.

== Winners ==
(Cumulative wins shown in parentheses.)

- 1: 1984 John Faeo (1) / Rod Frank (1)
- 2: 1985 Scott Davis (1) / Gary Eoff (1)
- 3: 1986 John Faeo (2) / Dan Zipay (1)
- 4: 1987 John Faeo (3) / Dan Zipay (2)
- 5: 1988 John Faeo (4) / Dan Zipay (3)
- 6: 1989 Scott Davis (2) / Mark Torkelson (1)
- 7: 1990 John Faeo (5) / Bob Gilman (1)
- 8: 1991 John Faeo (6) / Bob Gilman (2)
- 9: 1992 Dan Zipay (4) / Evan Booth (1)
- 10: 1993 Scott Davis (3) / Bill Long (1)
- 11: 1994 Evan Booth (2) / Dan Zipay(5)
- 12: 1995 Todd Palin (1) / Dwayne Drake(1)
- 13: 1996 John Faeo (7) / Bob Gilman (3)
- 14: 1997 Mark Carr (1) / Scott Davis (4)
- 15: 1998 Mark Carr (2) / Scott Davis (5)
- 16: 1999 Mark Carr (3) / Scott Davis (6)
- 17: 2000 Todd Palin (2) / Dusty VanMeter (1) [Pro], Steve Deptula (1) / Pat Reilly (1)[Masters]
- 18: 2001 Tracey Brassard (1) / Ken Lee (1) [Pro], Jack Bronner (1) / Mike Lindeen (1) [Masters]
- 19: 2002 Todd Palin (3) / Dusty VanMeter (2)
- —: 2003 Race canceled due to lack of snow
- 20: 2004 Mark Carr (4) / Dusty VanMeter (3)
- 21: 2005 Marc McKenna (1 ) / Nick Olstad (1)
- 22: 2006 Dwayne Drake (2) / Andy George (1)
- 23: 2007 Todd Palin (4) / Scott Davis (7)
- 24: 2008 Marc McKenna (2) / Eric Quam (1)
- 25: 2009 Todd Minnick (1) / Nick Olstad (2)
- 26: 2010 Chris Olds (1) / Tyler Huntington (1)
- 27: 2011 Chris Olds (2) / Tyler Huntington (2)
- 28: 2012 Marc McKenna (3) / Dusty VanMeter (4)
- 29: 2013 Marc McKenna (4) / Dusty VanMeter (5)
- 30: 2014 Todd Minnick (1) / Nick Olstad (2)
- 31: 2015 Scott Faeo (1) / Eric Quam (2)
- 32: 2016 Tyler Aklestad (1) / Tyson Johnson (1)
- 33: 2017 Cory Davis (1) / Ryan Simons (1)
- 34: 2018 Mike Morgan (1) / Chris Olds (3)
- 35: 2019 Mike Morgan (2) / Chris Olds (4)
- 36: 2020 Tyler Aklestad (2) / Nick Olstad (3)
- 37: 2021 Brad George (1) / Robert Schachle (1)
- 38: 2022 Tyler Aklestad (3) / Nick Olstad (4)
- 39: 2023 Tyler Aklestad (4) / Nick Olstad (5)
- 40: 2024 Cody Barber (1) / Brett Lapham (1)
