= Todd Palin =

Ex-husband of Sarah Palin

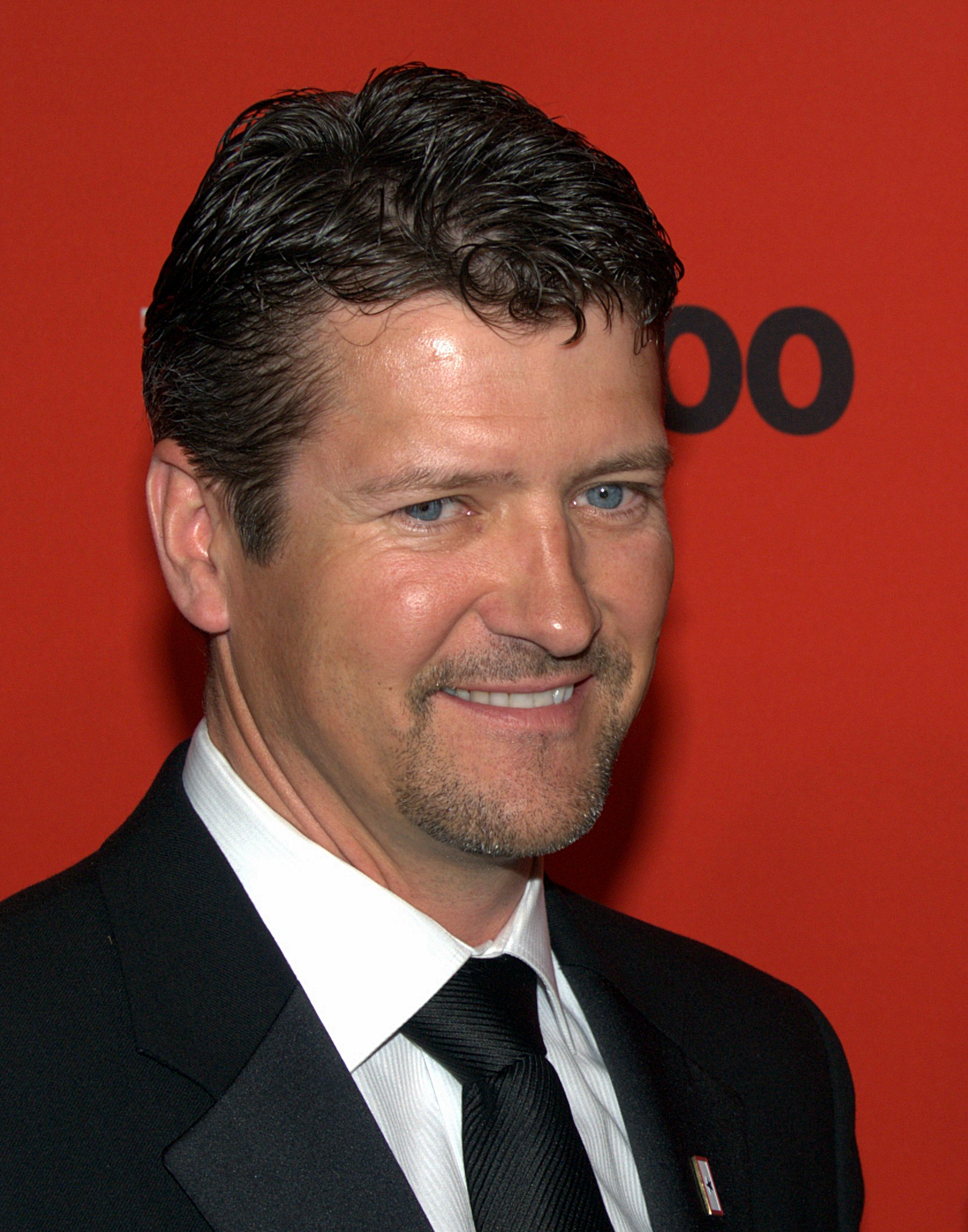
- Palin at the 2010 Time 100 Gala

First Gentleman of Alaska
- In role December 4, 2006 – July 26, 2009
- Governor: Sarah Palin
- Preceded by: Nancy Murkowski (First Lady)
- Succeeded by: Sandra Parnell (First Lady)

First Gentleman of Wasilla
- In role October 14, 1996 – October 14, 2002
- Mayor: Sarah Palin
- Preceded by: Karen Marie (First Lady)
- Succeeded by: David Keller

Personal details
- Born: Todd Mitchell Palin; September 6, 1964 (age 62) Dillingham, Alaska, U.S.
- Party: Independent
- Other political affiliations: Alaska Independence (1995–2002)
- Spouse: Sarah Heath (m. 1988; div. 2020)
- Children: 5, including Bristol
- Occupation: Oil field production worker Commercial fisherman Snowmachine racer

Todd Mitchell Palin (born September 6, 1964) is an American businessman who was the first gentleman of Alaska from 2006 to 2009. He is the former husband of former Alaska governor Sarah Palin, the 2008 Republican vice presidential nominee with John McCain.

== Early life and education ==
Palin was born and raised in Dillingham, Alaska to James F. "Jim" and Blanche Palin (née Roberts). Palin has Yup'ik, Dutch, and English ancestry. His grandmother Lena Andree was the daughter of a Dutch-American father and a Yup'ik mother and she grew up speaking both English and Yup'ik. Palin grew up in the now abandoned community of Tuklung in a mixed race region of Bristol Bay and was a member of an Alaska Native corporation, but was not an enrolled citizen of any tribe. Palin is not actively involved in Native politics or any Native organizations, but receives dividends from the Bristol Bay Native Corporation. His blood quantum is one-eighth and that of his children is one-sixteenth. Because he is a non-enrolled lineal descendant of an enrolled Alaska Native (his great-grandmother), he and his children are eligible for health benefits under federal law through the 1970 Alaska Native Claims Settlement Act. Tuklung was consolidated into the Manokotak Village, a federally recognized tribe.

In 1982, Palin graduated from Wasilla High School, which is the same alma mater of his wife and their eldest two children, son Track and daughter Bristol. He has taken some college courses but did not complete a degree.

== Career ==
Palin was a union member and belonged to the United Steelworkers union.

For 18 years, he worked for BP in the North Slope oil fields of Alaska. In 2007, in order to avoid a conflict of interest that related to his wife's position as governor, he took a leave from his job as production supervisor, when his employer became involved in natural gas pipeline negotiations with his wife's administration. Seven months later, because the family needed more income, Todd returned to BP. In order to avoid potential conflict of interest, this time, he accepted a non-management position as a production operator. He resigned from his job on September 18, 2009, with the stated reason as a desire to spend more time with his family.

He is also a commercial salmon fisherman at Bristol Bay on the Nushugak River.

== Public life ==
=== Voter registration ===
Palin first registered to vote in 1989. From October 1995 through July 2002, except for a few months in 2000, he was registered to vote as a member of the Alaskan Independence Party. In late August 2008, Politico reported that Palin was registered to vote as an independent (undeclared), and had never registered as a Republican. His wife, Sarah, confirmed that he is not registered with any party both in her 2009 memoir, Going Rogue: An American Life, and in a Q&A session following a 2010 address to a national convention of the Tea Party in Nashville, Tennessee.

=== First gentleman of Alaska ===
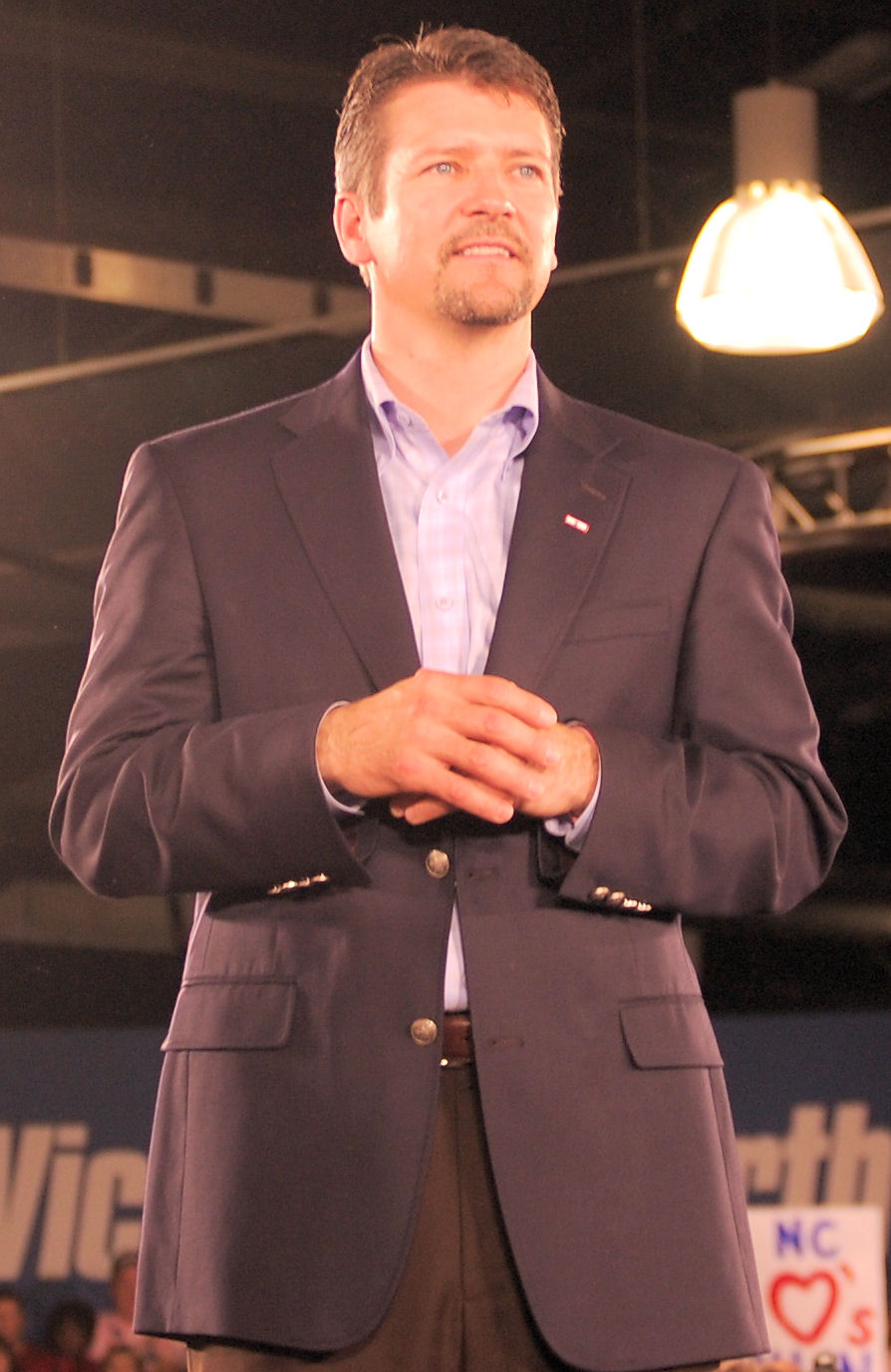
Palin in Raleigh, North Carolina

Palin was the first gentleman, or "first dude," as he was often nicknamed, for two and a half years, from 2006 to 2009. Early on in that role, he encouraged young Alaskans who could not afford college to consider jobs in the oil and gas industry as an effective training ground, and advised the governor on workforce development issues for the natural gas pipeline she supported.

In February 2010, the state of Alaska released to msnbc.com reporter Bill Dedman about 1,200 e-mails, which totaled 3,000 pages, that Palin exchanged with state officials. Almost 250 additional ones were withheld by the state, under a claim that executive privilege extends to Palin as an unpaid adviser to the government. Gregg Erickson, columnist for the Anchorage Daily News, said, in September 2008, that Palin "obviously plays an important role ... I've seen him in the governor's office and I know that she's conducted interviews in the governor's office with him present". The emails showed Palin discussing a wide range of activities: potential board appointees, constituent complaints, use of the state jet, oil and gas production, marine regulation, gas pipeline bids, wildfires, native Alaskan issues, the state effort to save the Matanuska Maid dairy, budget planning, potential budget vetoes, oil shale leasing, "strategy for responding to media allegations," staffing at the mansion, per diem payments to the governor for travel, "strategy for responding to questions about pregnancy," potential cuts to the governor's staff, "confidentiality issues," Bureau of Land Management land transfers and trespass issues and requests to the U.S. transportation secretary.

=== Other ===
As of late 2009, Palin was a community volunteer who worked in youth sports, coaching hockey and basketball. He was a judge in the 2008 Miss Alaska pageant.

In August 2012, Palin became a contestant on the NBC celebrity reality competition series Stars Earn Stripes.

Thoroughbred racehorse First Dude, named after Palin's nickname, finished second at the 2010 Preakness Stakes and won the 2011 Hollywood Gold Cup.

== Champion snowmachine racer ==
Palin is a four-time champion of the Tesoro Iron Dog, the world's longest snowmachine race, which traces the path of the Iditarod race with an extra journey of several hundred miles to Fairbanks added.

Palin had competed in the Tesoro every year from 1993 to at least 2007. His racing teammate is Scott Davis, with whom he won in 2007. He has previously raced with Dusty Van Meter in the race, and they were co-champions in 2000 and 2002. In 1995, Palin partnered with Dwayne Drake for his first win.

In 2008, while defending his Tesoro Iron Dog championship, he was injured and broke his arm 400 miles (640 km) from the finish line when he was thrown 70 feet from his machine. He was sent to the hospital but managed to finish in fourth place.

In 2016, trying for another Tesoro Iron Dog championship, he was forced to scratch at checkpoint Nenana, 112 miles from the finish, when partner Shane Barber suffered engine trouble.

In March 2016, Palin was seriously injured in a snowmachine crash, suffering a collapsed lung, fractured ribs, and a broken clavicle and shoulder blade.

== Public Safety commissioner controversy ==
Palin's name has appeared in news reports regarding the firing of commissioner Walt Monegan and the actions of Alaska state trooper Mike Wooten. At one point, Todd Palin brought information prepared by himself and a private investigator to Monegan.

On September 12, 2008, the Alaska legislature subpoenaed Palin to testify on his role in the controversy. On September 18, the McCain/Palin campaign announced that Todd Palin would refuse to testify because he does not believe the investigation is legitimate. State senator Bill Wielechowski said that the witnesses could not be punished for disobeying the subpoenas until the full legislature comes into session, then scheduled to be in January 2009.

On October 10, 2008, Palin was cited in special investigator Stephen Branchflower's report to the Legislative Council. One of Branchflower's four main findings was that the governor had violated Alaska's ethics act when she "wrongfully permitted Todd Palin to use the governor's office ... to continue to contact subordinate state employees in an effort to find some way to get trooper Wooten fired". Todd Palin's conduct was not assessed in the report, as he was not an executive branch employee.

== Personal life ==
In August 1988, Palin eloped with his high-school girlfriend Sarah Heath. The Palins have five children: Track Charles James (b. 1989), who enlisted in the United States Army and deployed to Iraq on September 11, 2008; Bristol Sheeran Marie (b. 1990); Willow Bianca Faye (b. 1994); Piper Indy Grace (b. 2001); and Trig Paxson Van (b. 2008), who has Down syndrome; they also have nine grandchildren.

Palin fishes and holds a private pilot certificate. He also owns his own aircraft, a Piper PA-18 Super Cub.

Palin's stepmother, Faye Palin, ran unsuccessfully in 2002 for the position of mayor of Wasilla, Alaska, to succeed Palin's wife, who was term-limited. Faye Palin, who is pro-choice and a registered Democrat, lost to Dianne M. Keller, a candidate endorsed by Sarah Palin.

Palin filed for divorce from Sarah on August 29, 2019, citing "incompatibility of temperament". The divorce was finalized on March 23, 2020.

Honorary titles
| Preceded by Karen Marie Brewer (1949–2005) | First Gentleman of Wasilla; October 14, 1996 – October 14, 2002 | Succeeded by David Keller |
| Preceded by Nancy Murkowski | First Gentleman of Alaska; December 4, 2006 – July 26, 2009 | Succeeded by Sandra Parnell |
