= Alaska State Medical Board =

Medical governing board

The Alaska State Medical Board is the medical governing board in the U.S. state of Alaska. Staffed by the Division of Occupational Licensing, it is a member of the Federation of State Medical Boards.

== History ==
=== COVID-19 ===
In December 2021, the Board received complaints from multiple doctors after receiving unsolicited gift bags from members of the Alaska Covid Alliance. The bags contained chocolates, a signed letter to the Board advocating for early treatment of COVID-19, and pamphlets advocating for off-label use of ivermectin.
