= National Register of Historic Places listings in Matanuska-Susitna Borough, Alaska =

Location of the Matanuska-Susitna Borough in Alaska

This is a list of the National Register of Historic Places listings in Matanuska-Susitna Borough, Alaska.

This is intended to be a complete list of the properties and districts on the National Register of Historic Places in Matanuska-Susitna Borough, Alaska, United States. The locations of National Register properties and districts for which the latitude and longitude coordinates are included below, may be seen in an online map.

There are 30 properties and districts listed on the National Register in the borough.

This National Park Service list is complete through NPS recent listings posted August 14, 2026.

== Current listings ==
	Name on the Register	Image	Date listed	Location	City or town	Description
1	Bailey Colony Farm	Bailey Colony Farm	June 21, 1991 (#91000775)	3150 North Glenn Highway; 61°36′57″N 149°07′10″W	Palmer vicinity	
2	Berry House		June 21, 1991 (#91000779)	5805 North Farm Loop Road; 61°38′42″N 149°08′53″W	Palmer vicinity	
3	Campbell House	Campbell House	April 3, 2013 (#13000129)	1540 Inner Springer Loop; 61°34′15″N 149°07′38″W	Palmer vicinity	
4	Cunningham-Hall PT-6, NC-692W		December 29, 1978 (#78000531)	In Alaska Museum of Transportation and Industry, 3800 West Museum Drive; 61°34′38″N 149°32′39″W	Wasilla	Originally in the Transportation Museum of Alaska, in Palmer.
5	Curry Lookout		April 27, 1992 (#92000424)	Atop Curry Ridge, mile 137.2 of the Parks Highway; 62°37′22″N 150°05′54″W	Talkeetna	
6	Fairview Inn	Fairview Inn	May 7, 1982 (#82004905)	Main Street; 62°19′24″N 150°06′48″W	Talkeetna	Also a contributing property to Talkeetna Historic District
7	Herried House		June 21, 1991 (#91000778)	4400 North Palmer-Fishook Road; 61°37′41″N 149°10′13″W	Palmer vicinity	
8	High Ridge		August 19, 2021 (#100006829)	9721 East Hilscher Hwy. 61°34′39″N 149°10′26″W	Palmer vicinity	Homesite of Fred Machetanz
8	Hyland Hotel	Hyland Hotel	June 21, 1991 (#91000774)	333 Evergreen Avenue; 61°35′59″N 149°07′11″W	Palmer	
9	Independence Mines	Independence Mines	October 9, 1974 (#74000440)	About 14.2 miles (22.9 km) northwest of Palmer; 61°47′25″N 149°17′05″W	Palmer vicinity	
10	Kirsch's Place		January 9, 1998 (#97001631)	About 10.5 miles (16.9 km) south of Talkeetna; 62°10′01″N 150°04′30″W	Talkeetna	
11	Knik Site	Knik Site	July 24, 1973 (#73000379)	Along South Knik Goose Bay Road, about 13 miles (21 km) southwest of Wasilla; 61°27′27″N 149°43′52″W	Wasilla	
12	Matanuska Colony Community Center		June 21, 1991 (#91000773)	Roughly bounded by South Colony Way, East Firewood Avenue, South Eklutna Street, East Elmwood Avenue, South Denali Street and a line of properties along East Dahlia Avenue; 61°35′56″N 149°06′34″W	Palmer	
13	Old Willow Community Center		October 5, 2017 (#100001695)	W. Willow Community Center Cir. 61°44′40″N 150°03′03″W	Willow	
14	Palmer Depot	Palmer Depot	January 9, 1978 (#78000530)	Corner of Evergreen Avenue and South Valley Way; 61°36′00″N 149°06′49″W	Palmer	Also a contributing property to Matanuska Colony Community Center
15	Patten Colony Farm		June 21, 1991 (#91000776)	Mile 39.9 of the Glenn Highway, about 1.7 miles (2.7 km) southwest of Palmer; 61°34′43″N 149°08′29″W	Palmer vicinity	
16	Puhl House	Puhl House	June 21, 1991 (#91000777)	Corner of Scott Road and Glenn Highway; 61°36′38″N 149°07′09″W	Palmer	
17	Raymond Rebarchek Colony Farm	Raymond Rebarchek Colony Farm	October 3, 1978 (#78000532)	Along East Rebarcheck Avenue, about 1.6 miles (2.6 km) southwest of Palmer; 61°34′38″N 149°07′37″W	Palmer	
18	Susitna River Bridge	Susitna River Bridge	September 15, 1977 (#77000227)	Alaska Railroad Mile 264.1, North of Gold Creek; 62°46′05″N 149°41′35″W	Gold Creek	Railroad bridge
19	Sutton Community Hall		August 27, 2013 (#13000617)	Alon Jonesville Road, about 0.25 miles (0.40 km) north of Glenn Highway; 61°42′40″N 148°53′49″W	Sutton	
20	Talkeetna Airstrip	Talkeetna Airstrip	August 2, 2002 (#02000814)	Along D Street, from East First Street to the Susitna River; 62°19′12″N 150°06′48″W	Talkeetna	
21	Talkeetna Historic District	Talkeetna Historic District	April 26, 1993 (#93000321)	Roughly bounded by C Street, East First Street, D Street, and Front Street; 62°19′23″N 150°06′52″W	Talkeetna	Includes Fairview Inn
22	Tangle Lakes Archeological District		November 12, 1971 (#71001091)	Address restricted	Paxson	The archeological district is mostly comprised in Copper River Census Area.
23	Teeland's Country Store	Teeland's Country Store	November 14, 1978 (#78000533)	Corner of East Herning Avenue and North Boundary Street; 61°34′57″N 149°26′24″W	Wasilla	
24	Blanche and Oscar Tryck House		September 15, 2004 (#04000968)	North Knik Street, between Parks Highway and East Herning Avenue; 61°34′53″N 149°26′38″W	Wasilla	
25	United Protestant Church	United Protestant Church	April 10, 1980 (#80000757)	Corner of South Denali Street and East Elmwood Avenue; 61°35′55″N 149°06′29″W	Palmer	Also a contributing property to Matanuska Colony Community Center
26	Wasilla Community Hall		September 8, 1982 (#82002072)	323 Main Street; 61°34′58″N 149°26′27″W	Wasilla	
27	Wasilla Depot	Wasilla Depot	December 16, 1977 (#77000218)	415 East Railroad Avenue; 61°34′49″N 149°26′26″W	Wasilla	
28	Wasilla Elementary School	Wasilla Elementary School	February 5, 1980 (#80000758)	Corner of East Swanson Avenue and North Boundary Street; 61°34′58″N 149°26′24″W	Wasilla	
29	Whitney Section House		October 6, 2004 (#04001106)	In Alaska Museum of Transportation and Industry, 3800 West Museum Drive; 61°34′38″N 149°32′36″W	Wasilla	Originally located in Anchorage, was moved to Palmer in 1976, and then to Wasilla in 1992.

== See also ==
- List of National Historic Landmarks in Alaska
- National Register of Historic Places listings in Alaska
