= Matanuska Valley Colony =

Farming community in Matanuska Valley, Alaska, U.S.

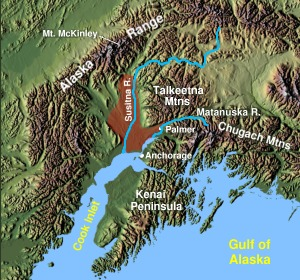
Relief map of the Matanuska-Susitna Valley

In 1935, the Federal Emergency Relief Administration created an experimental farming community known as the Matanuska Valley Colony as part of the New Deal resettlement plan. Situated in the Matanuska Valley, about 45 miles northeast of Anchorage, Alaska, the colony was settled by 203 families from Minnesota, Wisconsin and Michigan. The colony project cost about $5,000,000 and, after five years, over half of the original colonists had left the valley. By 1965, only 20 of the first families were still farming the valley.

== History ==
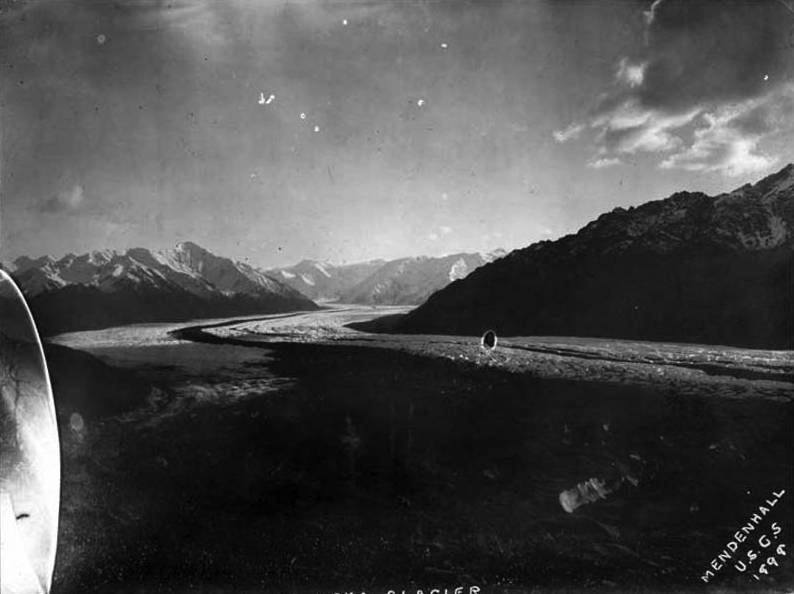
View of Matanuska Glacier in 1898, photographed by Walter Curran Mendenhall

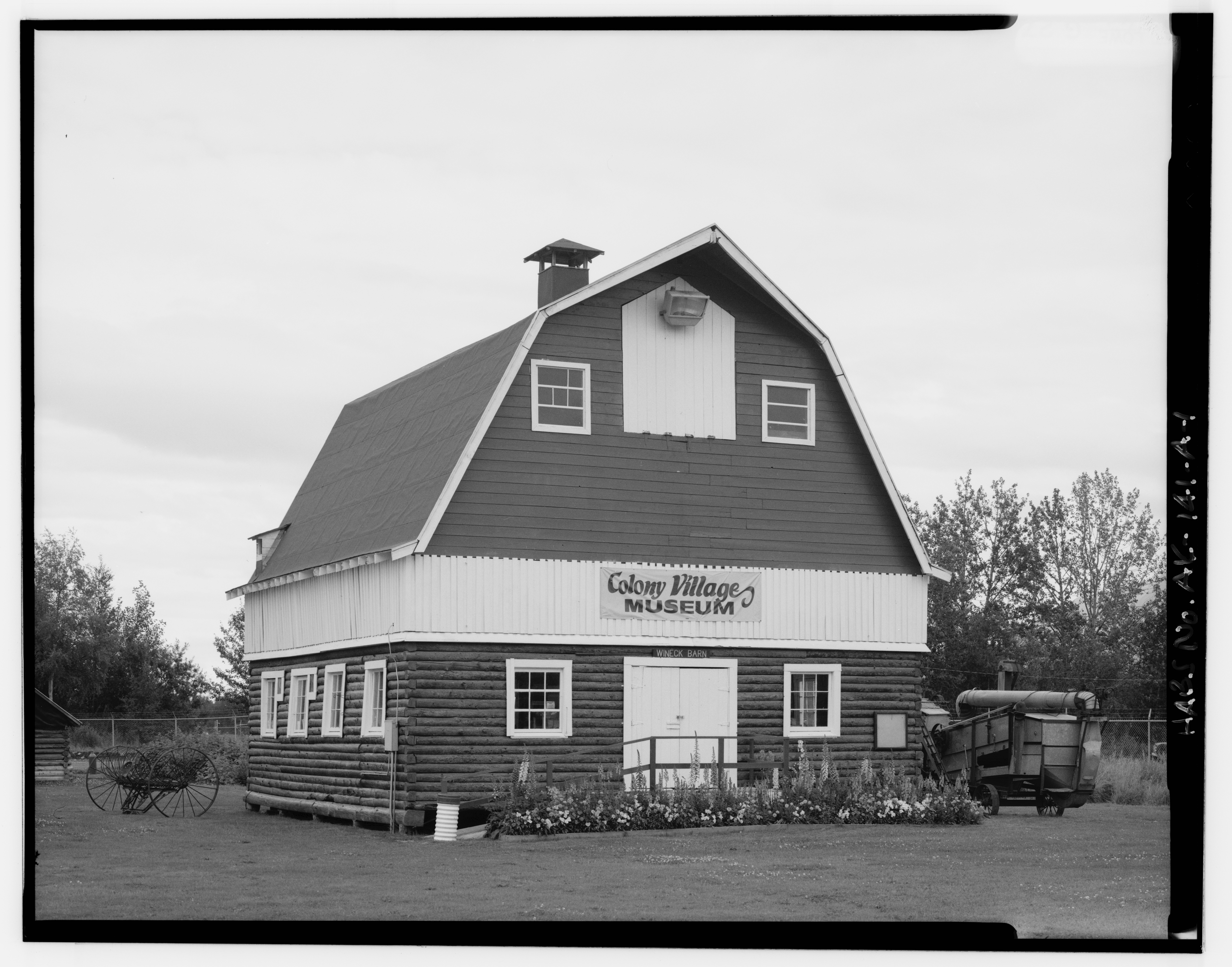
The Wireck Barn is located at the Alaska State Fairgrounds in Palmer, situated among other historic structures in a "Colony Village".

The Matanuska Colony was part of Franklin D. Roosevelt's New Deal plan to help move the United States out of the Great Depression. It was one of many rural rehabilitation colonies to be established by the Federal Emergency Relief Administration (FERA). Others included Cherry Lake Farms in Florida, Dyess Colony in Arkansas, and the Pine Mountain Valley Rural Community in Georgia.

In 1935, Americans in rural areas of northern states were among the worst sufferers of the Great Depression. In order to alleviate some of the pressures upon these areas, FERA commissioned applicants from Minnesota, Wisconsin, and Michigan to colonize a tract of land in the Territory of Alaska. The administration chose these states because of their climate and belief that the representatives would be well suited to survive harsh elements of subarctic winters. The hope was that the colony candidates would be good farmers with the necessary skills and hardiness required for self-sufficiency in the harsh Alaskan environment. Each family was to receive a 40-acre (16 ha) plot to turn into farmland.

From conception to realization, the project progressed rapidly. A survey was made of the Matanuska Valley in June 1934 to ascertain its agricultural viability. Some of the information that would have proven to be useful in planning the colony was not even available until after colonization had begun. Nonetheless, in January 1935, FERA and the Department of the Interior agreed to undertake the project. A few weeks later, 80,000 acres of land were set aside for the project and, by April, the first construction workers and colonists left for the valley aboard USMS North Star. According to historian Orlando W. Miller, a total of 241,332 acres were initially set aside for the colony, with an additional 7,780 acres added later on to provide more continuity between the farms. In effect, the government wanted to keep the farms together in a single area as opposed to being spread out across the vast region reserved by President Roosevelt's Executive Order 6957 of February 4, 1935.

The social workers in charge of selecting colonists were limited in their options. On one hand, they aimed to recruit hardy self-sufficient farmers that were true pioneers. On the other hand, they were trying to get people off of federal aid. They were to choose on the basis of need. In effect, successful farmers were best off staying put, while the less successful farmers were the ones available to colonize the Matanuska valley. The recruitment also suffered from the enthusiasm of the candidates: they might have presented themselves as being a bit more capable than they actually were. The results revealed themselves early in the colony. Many left, many struggled, and many apparently did very little. The chosen colonists often were fairly skilled and self-sufficient, but they lacked specialized farming skills and industriousness. Most were not up for the challenge. Merely 31% of the original colonists remained in 1948. However, some of these colonists did not abandon Alaska for good. Rather, they made a living fishing, mining, trading, or doing construction for the military after the war started. The gap left by the ones who left was compensated for by recruiting more colonists and consolidating parcels.

In addition to the colonists not being as good farmers as had been hoped, the land was worse than anticipated. At one time, the valley was filled with a big glacier. This glacier had left its mark upon the land. It left areas covered with coarse gravel and rock outcroppings. The terrain could be unlevel with features non-conducive to efficient farming. Some of the parcels had to be doubled in size because of the sparsity of arable land within them.

Prices for land ranged from $5 per acre for uncleared land, to an undetermined amount in some areas where it had been enhanced. Settlers agreed to a 30-year payment schedule with an annual interest rate of 3%. The federal government built houses and barns and paid for the transportation of the families and some of their goods to Alaska. Equipment, livestock, farm machinery, and other supplies were supplied by the corporation for purchase, lease, or payment for use. Supplies were available for purchase at cost until settlers were self-supporting.

There were no permanent structures in the valley by the time the first settlers arrived. A tent city was erected while the valley was cleared of thick woods. Within weeks of the arrival in Alaska, there was a measles epidemic that spread throughout the colony. At that time, there were no permanent houses or hospitals. Though only a few settlers died, the event was disheartening and foreshadowed the difficulties of living in a remote area. There was a high failure rate due to the short growing seasons, steep freight prices, and distant markets. These harsh conditions took their toll on the settlers. By 1940, over half of the population had left the valley. In 1965, there were only 20 families left.

== Colony life ==
Colonists began to arrive to their new home in early May 1935. There was very little ready for them as far as housing and supplies were concerned. Colonists were forced to stay on the train until transient workers could complete their temporary tent housing. Plots of land were given out through a draw, with the majority of the plots still forested. The colonists quickly got to work clearing their land in order to comply with the government contracts they signed.

The Alaska Rural Rehabilitation Corporation (ARRC) was the governing body of the colony. The ARRC regulated the commissary, what was planted, as well as the activities of the colonists. It was also in charge of removing colonists who did not continue to meet expectations. Colonists who were in poor health, broke major rules, or were bad farmers could be asked to leave. There were many major issues within this administration. Rules and regulations as well as administrators were constantly changing. Within a month of their arrival, the colonists were extremely unhappy with their conditions.

By the end of their second month, 25 of the 200 colonists had returned home. On June 16 a group of colonists sent a telegram directly to President Roosevelt that read: "SIX WEEKS PASSED NOTHING DONE NO HOUSES WELLS ROADS INADEQUATE MACHINERY TOOLS GOVERNMENT FOOD UNDELIVERED COMMISSARY PRICES EXORBITANT EDUCATIONAL FACILITIES FOR SEASON DOUBTFUL…"

The lack of adequate health care was also a major source of unrest. There was only one doctor and a few Red Cross nurses in the colony. More serious cases had to be sent by train to Anchorage. Polio, measles, chicken pox, and pneumonia quickly ran through the community, especially affecting the children who made up half of the population. With the media spotlight on the colony, the government was forced into providing medical facilities. As the first winter approached, the ARRC felt the pressure to get permanent housing built. They abandoned plans to use local timber and brought lumber and carpenters in from Anchorage.

Though there were many sources of unhappiness for the colonists, they quickly bonded over their shared experience. Children played in the streets late into the night, dances were held every weekend in the community hall, and church was attended every Sunday. The colonists' life centered around community life.

== Operations ==
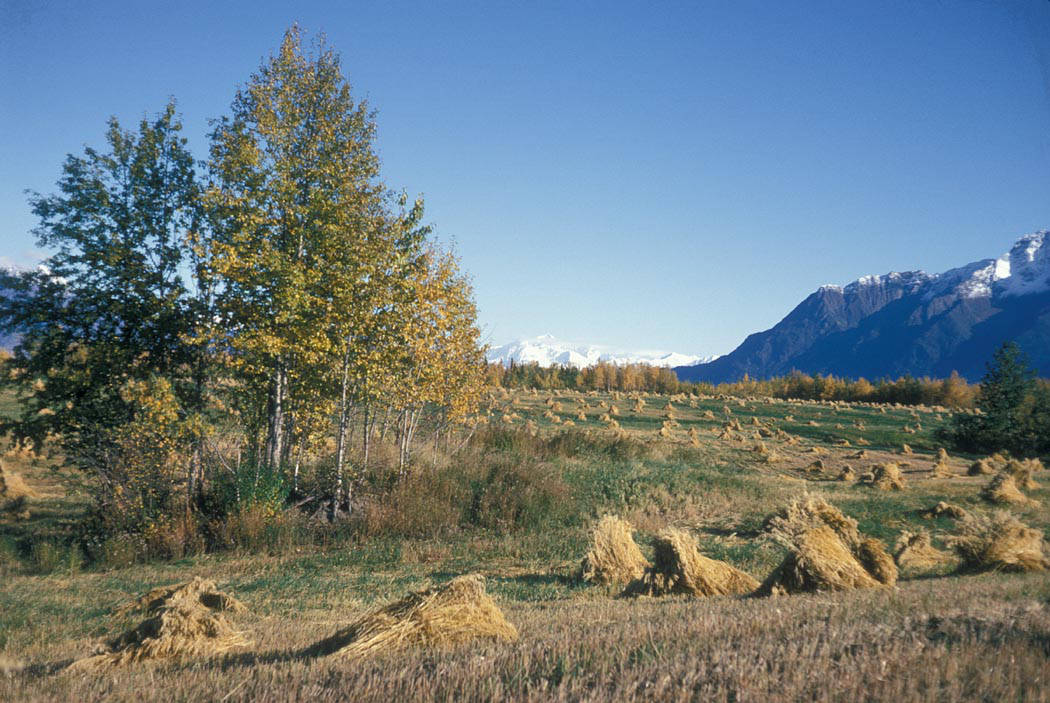
Matanuska Valley hay field

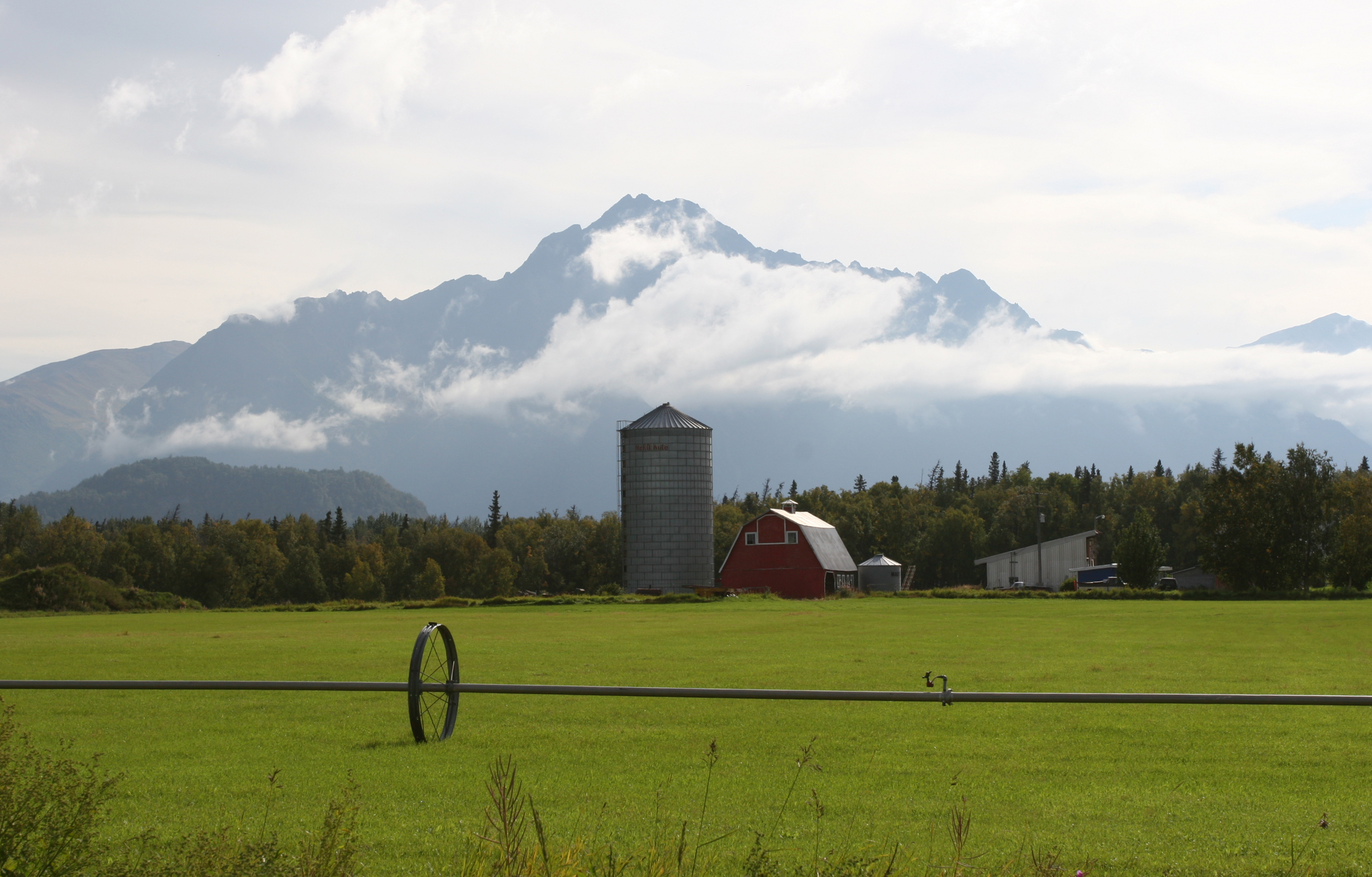
Matanuska Valley farm

The Matanuska Colony produced a range of crops and livestock. The primary cash crop were potatoes. In 1947, it was noted that approximately 2,500 tons were grown, with yields of 10–17 tons per acre, with the quality being excellent. Additional successful crops yielding thoroughly ripened grain included wheat, barley, oats, and winter rye. Hay, crops of oats, alone and with peas or vetch, also did well. Silage of oats and peas were also very successful. Farmers found that a wide variety of vegetables could also be grown and produced an extraordinary quality product. The Matanuska Valley Farmer's Cooperative Marketing Association handled much of the produce and marketed as well. The cooperative also purchased the supplies needed by the colony residents, such as feeds, seeds, fertilizer, farm machinery and general merchandise.

In 1947, the Matanuska Valley had the largest number of dairy cows and of dairy herds in the entire territory of Alaska – 33 dairies were all rated Grade A. Milk was sold bottled and pasteurized and delivered across the territory. Through the 1960s, farmers focused on milk and potato production. For a short period of time in the early 1960s, the military enforced a contract that required no more than 48-hours pass between pasteurization and delivery. This eliminated the truck-based shipment of milk from Seattle to Fairbanks, improving the profitability of the Matanuska and Tanana River valley dairies.

== Demographics ==
The Matanuska Valley Colony was returned on the 1940 U.S. Census as the Alaska Railroad Colony (unincorporated). It had a population of 789, which made it the then-12th largest community in the state of Alaska. This was the only time it was separately returned on census records.

Historical population
Census	Pop.	Note	%±
1940	789		—
U.S. Decennial Census

== Environment and climate ==
The mountainous terrain, glacial soils, and climate did not favour large-scale agriculture. The Matanuska, Susitna and Knik river valleys are of glacial origin and are hemmed in by high mountain ranges: the Alaska Range curves in the northwest, Talkeetna Mountains rise to the north and Chugach Mountains to the east. The marks of glacial advances and retreats are benches and terraces, depressions, moraines. The three rivers rising in the alpine icefields carry large amounts of loess on the broad floodplain. Wind-borne glacial silt continues to change the landscape and build up the soils today.

In 1916–1917 homesteading farmers settled along the railroad. A brief report of the valley's climate was prepared by M.B. Summers, of the U.S. Department of Commerce Weather Bureau in 1925. By 1935, the year when the federal-sponsored Midwestern farmers arrived, climate records had been kept for 15 years. In July 1941 the bureau established a network of 15 stations in collaboration with the Soil Conservation Service and the General Land Office, to record temperature and precipitation. (Of these 9 did not work beyond the first year.) In 1956 the Weather Bureau meteorologist Robert H. Dale published a technical paper based on 34 years of records from the Matanuska Agricultural Experiment Station (No. 14), with some additional records of 11 years from 5 stations (including one at Wasilla and one at Eluktna – the Anchorage Power Plant, established May 1941).

The findings:

- The farming area is limited, roughly a rectangle, 10–12 wide and extending from the Chugach Mountains on the east to 15–20 miles to the west.
- The valley borders on the Knik Arm of Cook Inlet and lies only 40 miles northwest of Prince William Sound, however, the Chugach Mountains block out the moist maritime air, except in the southwest over Cook Inlet; as a result the valley receives only a little more precipitation than Fairbanks inland.
- The soils of the valley consist of coarse water-sorted glacial drift with an overburden of wind-sorted silt and sand; the wind-transported deposits are the thickest in Palmer area, 6 feet; in Wasilla and to the west this layer is very thin; these soils (later called Brown Forest Soils), though relatively well-drained and warm, are geologically young, contain enough potassium (K), but amounts of other critical nutrients vary (Ca, Mg, N, P); also these soils are acidic (become neutral with cultivation).
- Spring is the sunniest but also the driest period of the year; summer brings cloudy skies and frequent drizzles; days are relatively warm and nights cool; in July average temperatures are lower than means in Minnesota, Wisconsin, and Michigan; freezing temperatures occur between March and August–September; the rainiest months are August and September.
- The topography creates many microclimates in the valley and differences in summer and autumn rainfall, solar radiation, and channeling of the local valley winds (northeasterly Matanuskas and southeasterly Kniks): the local winds influenced both temperatures and precipitation patterns; they were linked to erosion.
- Cool summers, short growing season, and unequal distribution of rainfall are the principal factors limiting crop farming; the climate favours such vegetables as potato, cabbage, lettuce, peas, turnips; potato is the main commercial crop; experiments have shown some grain varieties might be suitable for growing in the valley.
- The climate is well-suited for cattle and dairy farming.

== Legacy ==
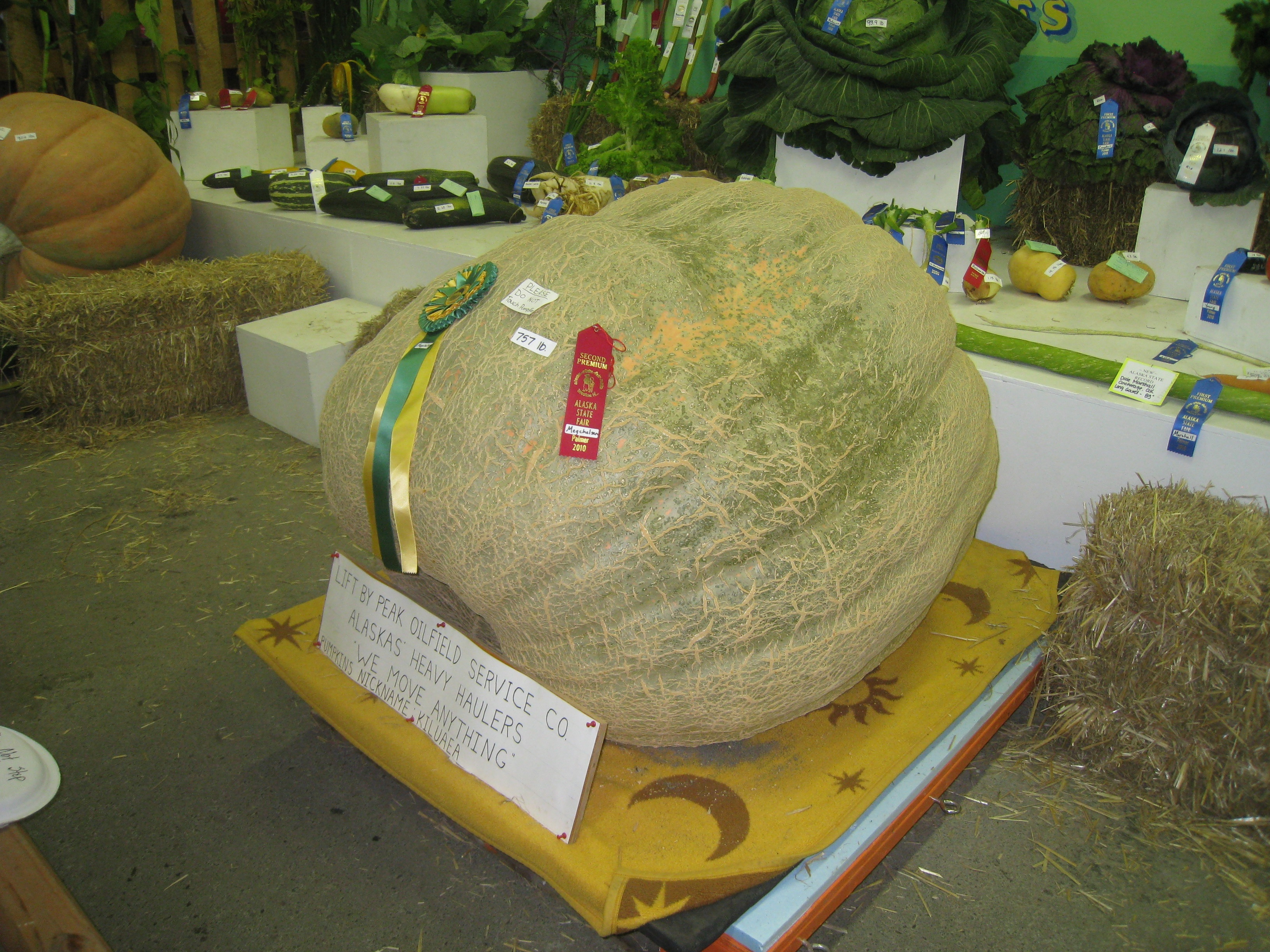
Oversized vegetables on display at the Alaska State Fair. The fair is currently located on a portion of the Rebarchek farm (see below).

Currently, the town of Palmer, Alaska, which descended from the Matanuska Valley colonists, is home to many of the children of the settlers. Some of the original structures from the colony, including a church and barn, have been moved to the Alaska State Fairgrounds. Other remnants of the colony include the lush crops of the valley. Although the colony was not a booming success, it did become stable enough to provide dairy and farming. It did not significantly increase the population of the area, but it did develop the Matanuska Valley as the primary agriculturally productive region within Alaska.

During the latter part of the twentieth century, the Matanuska Valley saw continued success with dairies and farming for local consumption. However, a number of factors limited their commercial success. With the decline of air and refrigerated freight costs, milk and other dairy products from the Pacific Northwest could be obtained for less than locally produced products. In addition, as the population of Anchorage grew to make it the largest city in Alaska, residents began to look towards the Matanuska Valley to build homes. Farm land became more expensive and taxes increased. As a result, many farmers sold their land to developers.

Dairy farming continued in the Matanuska Valley into the 21st century, largely through the Matanuska Maid Dairy (state-owned until 2006) and then the Matanuska Creamery, the largest of three dairies in the state. Problems with state funding and subsequent continued financial problems forced the closure of the creamery in 2012, leaving dairy farmers with no place to sell their milk.

=== National Register of Historic Places ===
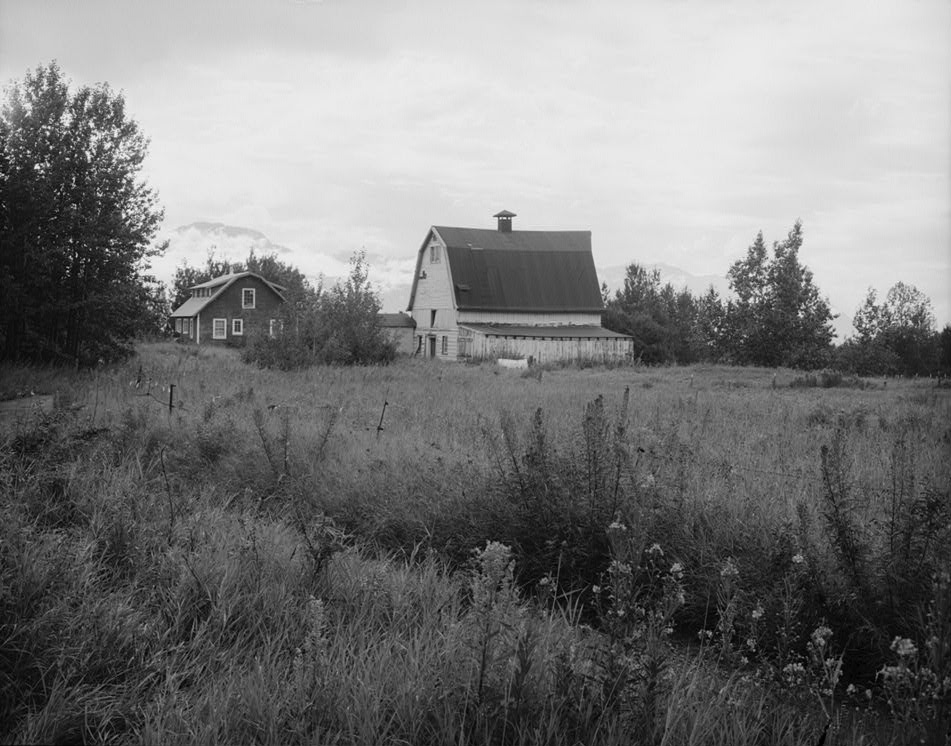
Bailey Colony Farm

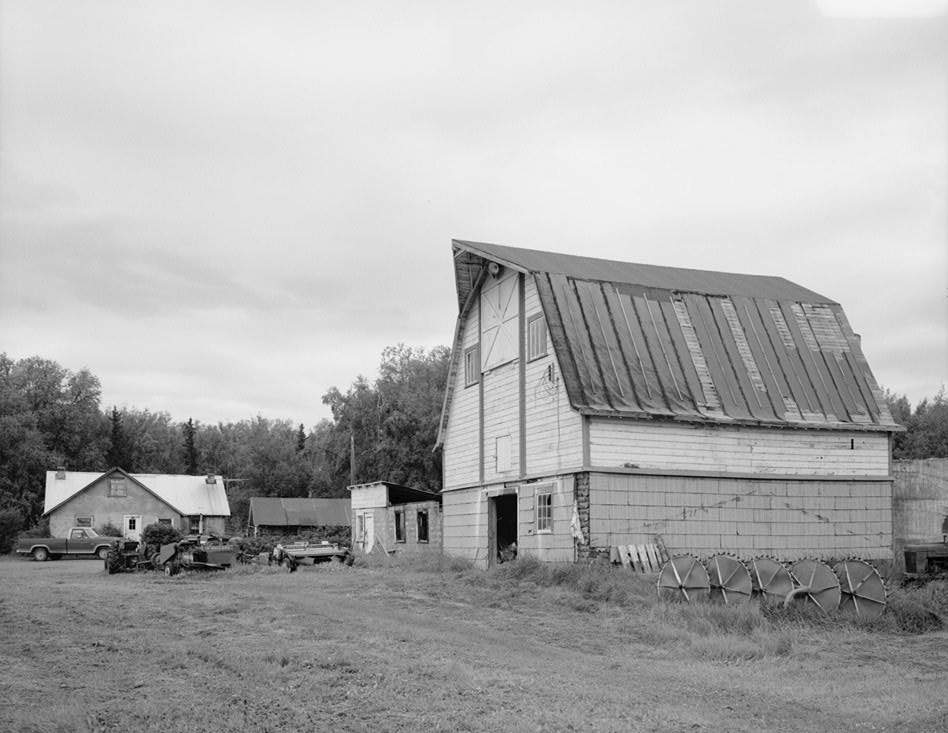
Barn and farmhouse of the Raymond Rebarchek Colony Farm, built in 1935

There are many buildings from the original construction of the Matanuska Valley Colony that have been placed on the National Register of Historic Places. To be included on this list, a property must be deemed worthy of preservation.

The following Matanuska Valley Colony farms and groups of buildings are included on the Register as Historic Districts:

- Bailey Colony Farm
- Matanuska Colony Community Center
- Patten Colony Farm

The following Matanuska Valley Colony buildings are included on the Register as Historic Buildings:

- Berry House
- Campbell House
- Herried House
- Palmer Depot
- Puhl House
- Raymond Rebarchek Colony Farm
- United Protestant Church

== See also ==
- Jay Kerttula, who came to Alaska with one of the original colonist families from Minnesota, was the longest-serving member in the history of the Alaska Legislature (1961–1963 and 1965–1995).
- National Register of Historic Places listings in Matanuska-Susitna Borough, Alaska
