= Teeland's Country Store =

- U.S. National Register of Historic Places
- Alaska Heritage Resources Survey
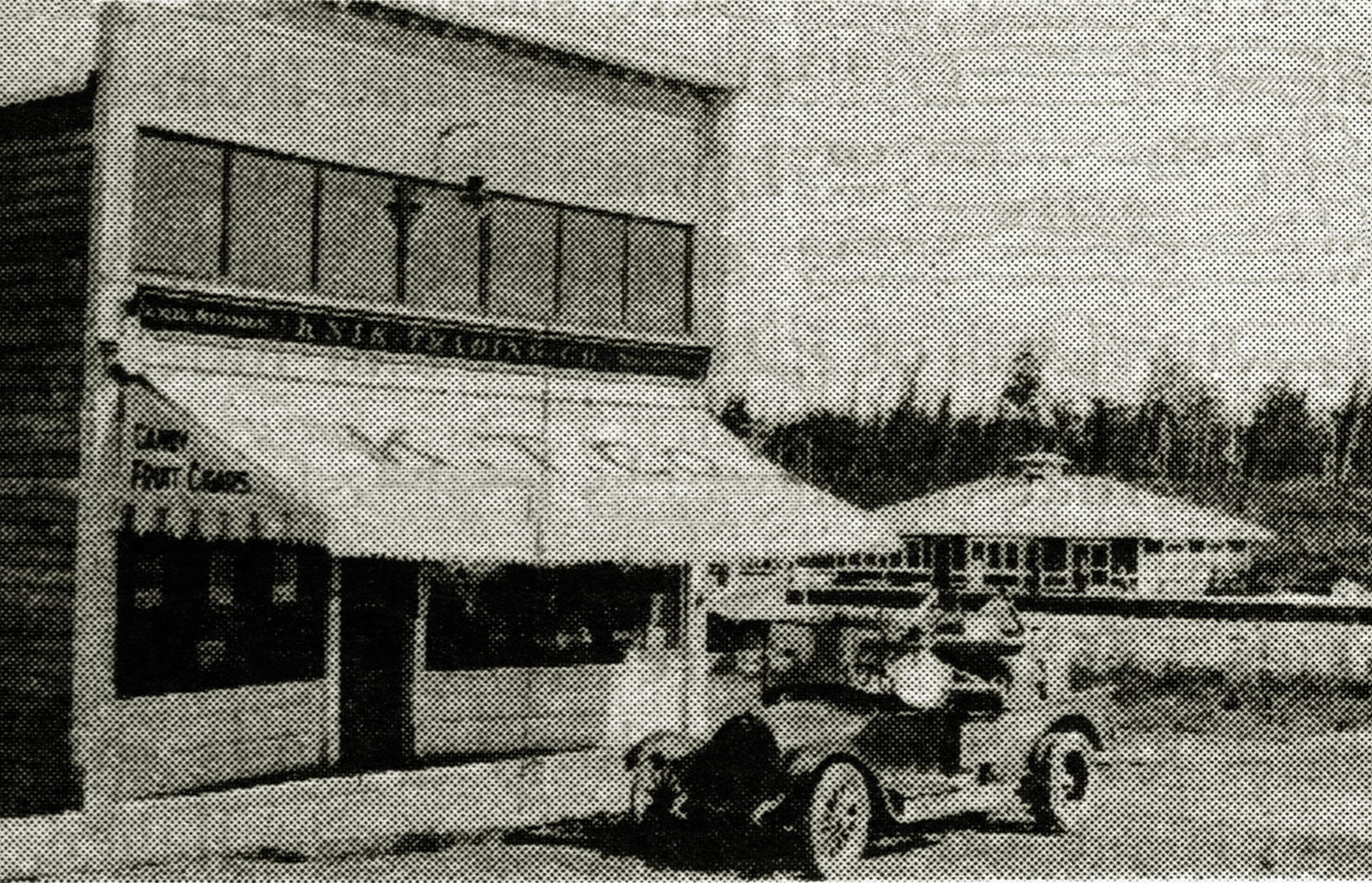

- Location within Alaska
- Location: Corner of East Herning Avenue and North Boundary Street, Wasilla, Alaska
- Coordinates: 61°34′57″N 149°26′24″W
- Area: less than one acre
- Built: 1917
- Built by: O.G. Herning
- NRHP reference No.: 78000533
- AHRS No.: ANC-114

Significant dates
- Added to NRHP: November 14, 1978
- Designated AHRS: August 1, 1976

Teeland's Country Store, also known as Herning's Place and Knik Trading Company, is a historic retail establishment located at the corner of East Herning Avenue and North Boundary Street in Wasilla, Alaska. The oldest portion of this wood-frame building is a log structure at the back whose construction dates to 1905. Originally located at Knik as Knik Trading Company, this log structure, then also used as a store, was moved to the newly established town of Wasilla on skids in 1917 by its builder, O. G. Herning. Herning also built the present utilitarian wood-frame structure, which still operates today. The business was purchased by Walter Teeland in 1947, giving it its present name. In 1972, the store was purchased by Jules and Leslie Mead and Neil Gail Bridgewater.

The building was listed on the National Register of Historic Places in 1978.

In 1986, the Meads donated the building to the Wasilla-Knik-Willow Creek Historical Society. The building was moved in 1987 as Teeland's Moonshine Shop.

== See also ==
- National Register of Historic Places listings in Matanuska-Susitna Borough, Alaska
