= Blanche and Oscar Tryck House =

Historic house in Alaska, United States

- U.S. National Register of Historic Places
- Alaska Heritage Resources Survey
- Location within Alaska
- Location: North Knik Street, between Parks Highway and East Herning Avenue, Wasilla, Alaska
- Coordinates: 61°34′53″N 149°26′38″W
- Area: less than one acre
- Built: 1917
- NRHP reference No.: 04000968
- AHRS No.: ANC-00764
- Added to NRHP: September 15, 2004

The Blanche and Oscar Tryck House is a historic house on North Knik Street (at the northwest corner with the Parks Highway) in Wasilla, Alaska. Built sometime before 1916 at Knik, it was the first house in Wasilla when the community was established, moved there by the Trycks in 1917. It is a single-story wood-frame structure, roughly rectangular in shape, with a concrete foundation and a corrugated metal gable roof configured to capture rainwater for laundry and other uses. It has a brick chimney and a root cellar, and has been vacant since Oscar Tryck died in 1964.

The house was listed on the National Register of Historic Places in 2004.

== See also ==
- National Register of Historic Places listings in Matanuska-Susitna Borough, Alaska
