= Sutton Community Hall =

- U.S. National Register of Historic Places
- Location within Alaska
- Location: West side of Jonesville Road, 0.25 miles (0.40 km) mile north of Glenn Highway, Sutton, Alaska
- Coordinates: 61°42′40″N 148°53′49″W
- Area: 0.6 acres (0.24 ha)
- Built: 1927
- NRHP reference No.: 13000617
- Added to NRHP: August 27, 2013

The Sutton Community Hall is a historic municipal building in Sutton, Alaska. It is located on the west side of Jonesville Road, about 0.25 miles (0.40 km) north of its junction with the Glenn Highway. It is a single-story wood-frame structure, measuring 40 by 70 feet (12 m × 21 m), with a shallow-pitch gabled sheet metal roof. The building has entrances on the north, south and east sides, the east-facing one sheltered by a hood with diagonal bracing. The exterior has several types of cladding, including asphalt shingles and board-and-batten siding. The building was built in 1927 to serve as a bunkhouse for workers building the Eklutna Power Plant, and was moved to the present location in 1950 to serve the unincorporated community of Sutton as a meeting space. The hall served the community as its principal civic and social meeting space for forty years.

The building was listed on the National Register of Historic Places in 2013. It was at that time unused and in deteriorating condition.

== See also ==
- National Register of Historic Places listings in Matanuska-Susitna Borough, Alaska
