= Kirsch's Place =

- U.S. National Register of Historic Places
- Alaska Heritage Resources Survey
- Location within Alaska
- Location: About 10.5 miles (16.9 km) south of Talkeetna, Alaska
- Coordinates: 62°10′01″N 150°04′30″W
- Area: 2 acres (0.81 ha)
- Built: 1946
- Built by: John Kirsch
- NRHP reference No.: 97001631
- AHRS No.: TAL-065
- Added to NRHP: January 9, 1998

Kirsch's Place, also known as the Fireweed Station Lodge, and now the Fireweed Station Inn, is a historic traveler accommodation near Talkeetna, Alaska. It is located about 10.5 miles (16.9 km) south of Talkeetna, roughly 200 feet (61 m) east of mile 215.3 of the Alaska Railroad, a place known as Sunshine Siding. It is a 1 1/2-story log structure, built in 1946 by John Kirsch as a residence and guest lodge. Kirsch operated the lodge until his death in 1959. The lodge is a rare survivor of a post-World War II rural building boom, which was later eclipsed as roads and settlement in the area became more prevalent.

The lodge was listed on the National Register of Historic Places in 1998.

== See also ==
- National Register of Historic Places listings in Matanuska-Susitna Borough, Alaska
