= Bailey Colony Farm =

- U.S. National Register of Historic Places
- U.S. Historic district
- Alaska Heritage Resources Survey
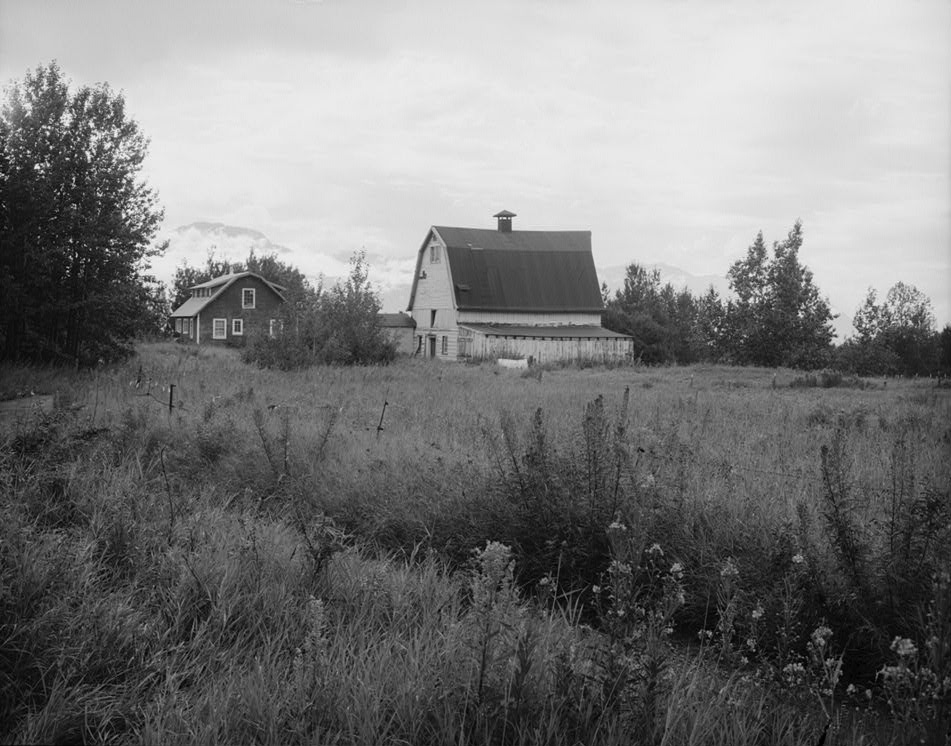

- Location within Alaska
- Location: 3150 North Glenn Highway
- Nearest city: Palmer, Alaska
- Coordinates: 61°36′57″N 149°07′10″W
- Area: 2 acres (0.81 ha)
- Built: 1935
- Built by: Ferber Bailey
- Architect: Williams, David
- MPS: Settlement and Economic Development of Alaska's Matanuska-Susitna Valley MPS
- NRHP reference No.: 91000775
- AHRS No.: ANC-056
- Added to NRHP: June 21, 1991

The Bailey Colony Farm, also known as the Estelle Farm, is a historic Matanuska Colony farmstead that dates from 1935. It is located along the Glenn Highway near Palmer, Alaska in Matanuska-Susitna Borough. It was part of a New Deal program opening farms in Alaska as part of assisting overpopulated rural areas of the lower 48 states of the US, in a program conceived of by FERA architect David Williams.

The Bailey Colony Farm was listed on the National Register of Historic Places in 1991. The listing included two contributing buildings. It was the home of Ferber and Ruth Bailey and their children, who were colonists from Wisconsin. The house is a 28-by-32-foot (8.5 m × 9.8 m) 1 1/2-story building with a gambrel roof; the barn is a 32-by-32-foot (9.8 m × 9.8 m) log and frame built building also with a gambrel roof. Both were built in 1935. The barn was moved about 150 feet in the 1940s to its present location, when the Glenn Highway was widened.

== See also ==
- Matanuska Valley Colony
- National Register of Historic Places listings in Matanuska-Susitna Borough, Alaska
