= Wasilla Elementary School =

- U.S. National Register of Historic Places
- Alaska Heritage Resources Survey
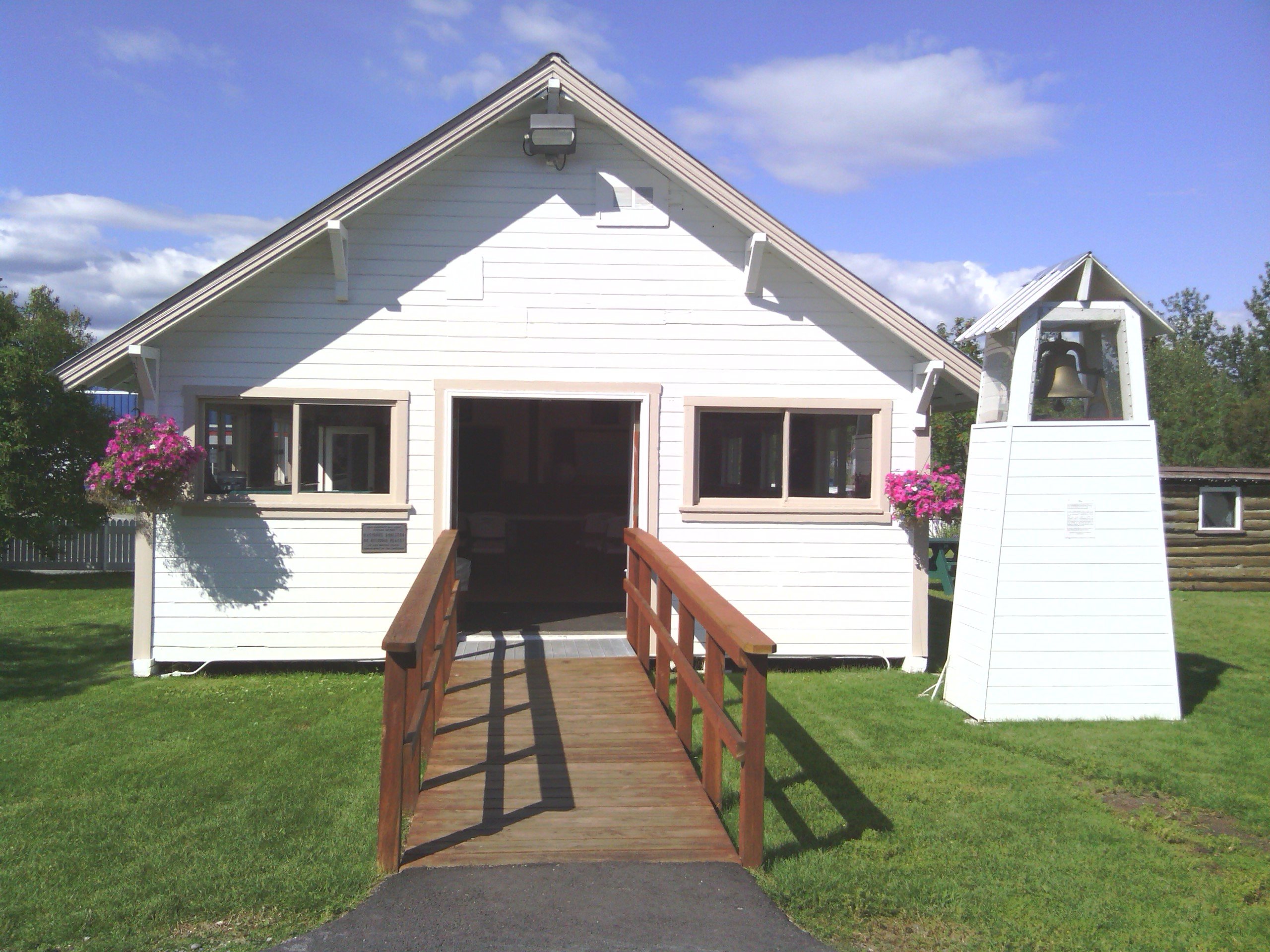

- Location within Alaska
- Location: Corner of East Swanson Avenue and North Boundary Street, Wasilla, Alaska
- Coordinates: 61°34′58″N 149°26′24″W
- Area: less than one acre
- Built: 1917
- NRHP reference No.: 80000758
- AHRS No.: ANC-110

Significant dates
- Added to NRHP: February 5, 1980
- Designated AHRS: June 20, 1979

The Wasilla Elementary School, located near the corner of East Swanson Avenue and North Boundary Street in Wasilla, Alaska, is a historic one-room school that was built in 1917. It was Wasilla's first school, and served as its primary school until 1934 when a larger school was built. It is 22 by 36 feet (6.7 m × 11.0 m) in dimension. It was moved to its present location, in a historic park, shortly before its NRHP nomination in 1979. It had been located about three blocks away. After 1934 it was used again as a school overflow classroom and it also served as a community hall and for weddings, funerals and other events; it served as a Church of Christ for a number of years.

The school was listed on the National Register of Historic Places in 1980.

== See also ==
- National Register of Historic Places listings in Matanuska-Susitna Borough, Alaska
