= Puhl House =

Historic house in Alaska, United States

- U.S. National Register of Historic Places
- Alaska Heritage Resources Survey
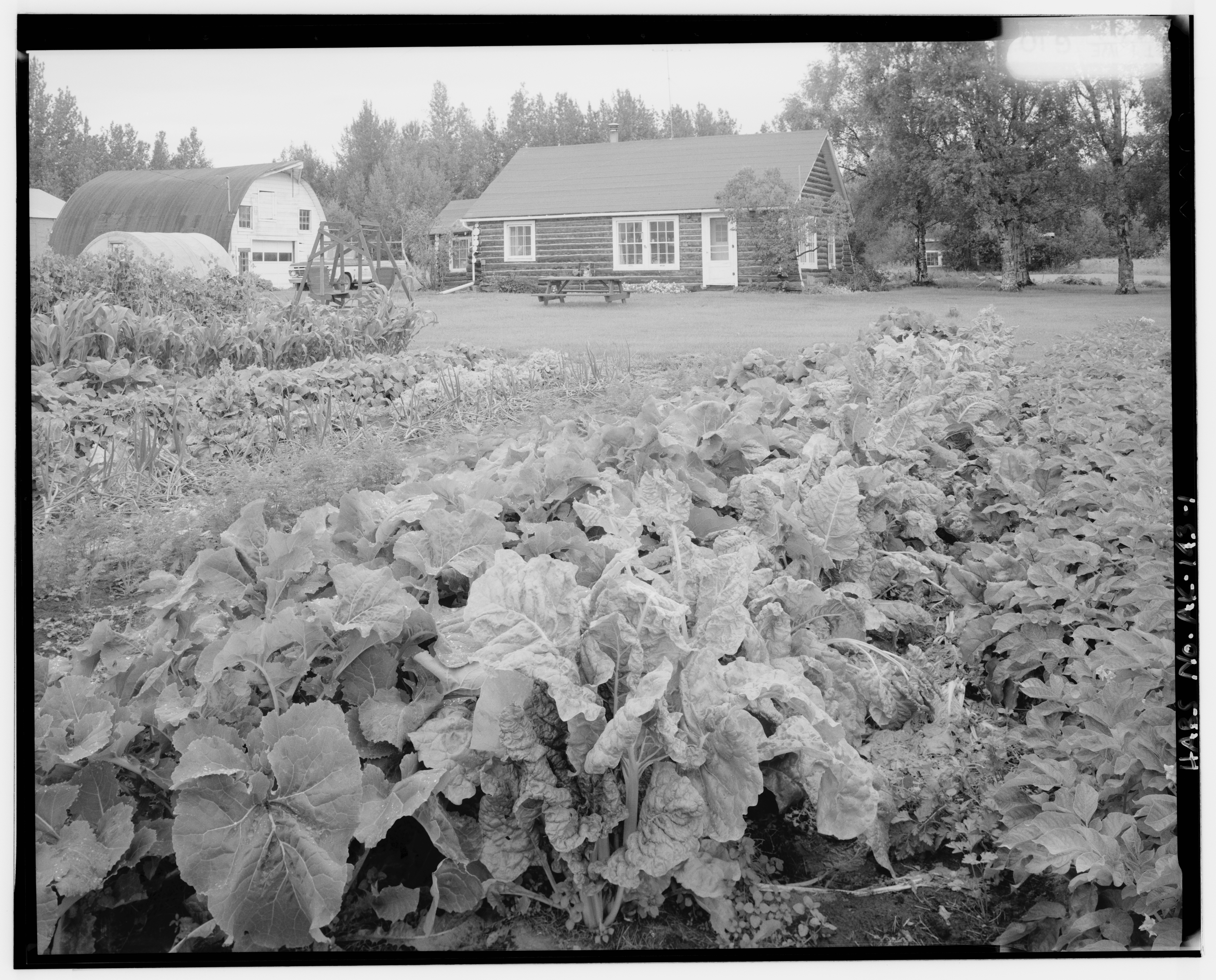
- 1991 HABS photo

- Location within Alaska
- Location: Corner of Scott Road and Glenn Highway in Palmer, Alaska
- Coordinates: 61°36′38″N 149°07′09″W
- Area: 5 acres (2.0 ha)
- Built: 1935; 91 years ago
- Built by: Joe Puhl
- MPS: Settlement and Economic Development of Alaska's Matanuska--Susitna Valley MPS
- NRHP reference No.: 91000777
- AHRS No.: ANC-197
- Added to NRHP: June 21, 1991

The Puhl House, also known as the Bacon House, is a historic house at the corner of Scott Road and Glenn Highway in Palmer, Alaska. It is a rectangular single-story log structure measuring 35 by 25 feet (10.7 m × 7.6 m), built out of round logs joined by saddle notches at the corners. The diameter and length of the logs reduces as they rise to the eaves; oakum chinking is used to close the gaps. The house was built in 1935 by Joe and Blanche Puhl, settlers who were part of the Matanuska Valley Colony settlement project. This building is distinctive as a colony house because it was not built by the crews of the Works Progress Administration that built most of the colony's housing; the Puhls organized their own construction team and acquired materials for its construction on their own.

The house was listed on the National Register of Historic Places in 1991.

== See also ==
- National Register of Historic Places listings in Matanuska-Susitna Borough, Alaska
