= Raymond Rebarchek Colony Farm =

- Rebarchek, Raymond, Colony Farm
- U.S. National Register of Historic Places
- Alaska Heritage Resources Survey
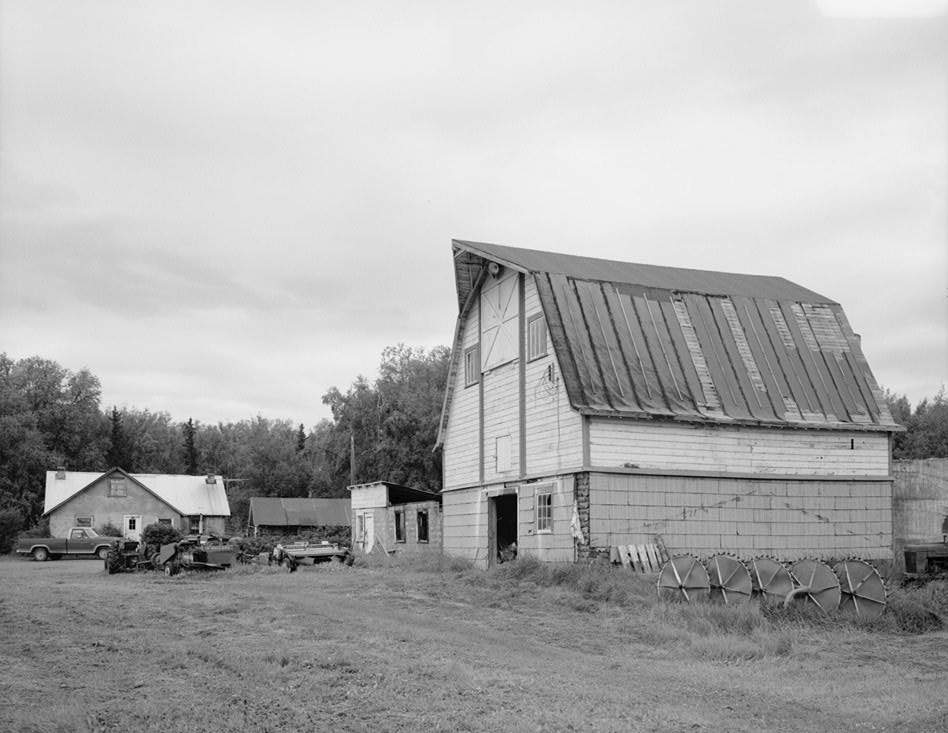
- 1991 HABS photo

- Location within Alaska
- Location: Along East Rebarcheck Avenue, about 1.6 miles (2.6 km) southwest of Palmer, Alaska
- Coordinates: 61.57728°N 149.1269°W
- Area: 40 acres (16 ha)
- Built: 1937
- Built by: Works Progress Administration
- NRHP reference No.: 78000532
- AHRS No.: ANC-134

Significant dates
- Added to NRHP: October 3, 1978
- Designated AHRS: September 30, 1977

The Raymond Rebarchek Colony Farm is a historic farm property on Rebarchek Avenue in Palmer, Alaska. It consists of a 40-acre (16 ha) tract of land granted to Raymond Rebarchek in a 1935 land lottery organized by the Matanuska Valley Colony, a Depression-era agricultural colony project. The property was listed on the National Register of Historic Places in 1978. At that time, the farm complex included ten buildings, including Rebarcheck's original log house (the first built in the colony), a dairy barn, a well house, a greenhouse, and a chicken house. Only the original farmhouse, silo, and milking parlor are still standing today. The Alaska State Fair purchased the property in 2002 and is contemplating the establishment of a demonstration farm there.

== See also ==
- National Register of Historic Places listings in Matanuska-Susitna Borough, Alaska
