= Wasilla Community Hall =

- U.S. National Register of Historic Places
- Alaska Heritage Resources Survey
- Location within Alaska
- Location: 323 Main Street, Wasilla, Alaska
- Coordinates: 61°34′58″N 149°26′27″W
- Area: 0.25 acres (0.10 ha)
- Built: 1930
- Architectural style: log building
- NRHP reference No.: 82002072
- AHRS No.: ANC-135

Significant dates
- Added to NRHP: September 8, 1982
- Designated AHRS: October 12, 1978

The Wasilla Community Hall, also known as the Wasilla Museum, now hosting the Dorothy G. Page Museum, is located at 323 Main Street in Wasilla, Alaska. The museum is located in a log building constructed in 1931 to serve as a community center. The exterior of the building was left largely as-is when it was converted to a museum in 1967. The interior houses displays about the history of the city of Wasilla.

The building was listed on the National Register of Historic Places in 1982.

== See also ==
- National Register of Historic Places listings in Matanuska-Susitna Borough, Alaska
