= United Protestant Church (Palmer, Alaska) =

Historic church in Alaska, United States

- U.S. National Register of Historic Places
- U.S. Historic district – Contributing property
- Alaska Heritage Resources Survey
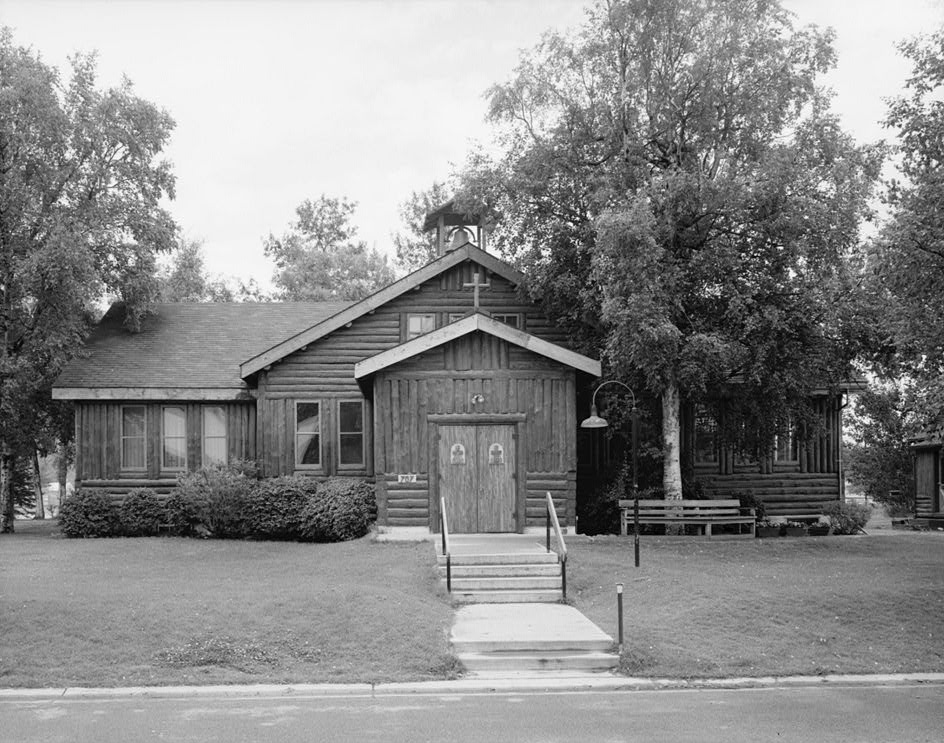

- Location within Alaska
- Location: Corner of South Denali Street and East Elmwood Avenue, Palmer, Alaska
- Coordinates: 61°35′55″N 149°06′29″W
- Area: less than one acre
- Built: 1937
- Built by: Leo B. Jacobs; Rev. Bert J. Bingle
- Part of: Matanuska Colony Community Center (ID91000773)
- NRHP reference No.: 80000757
- AHRS No.: ANC-248

Significant dates
- Added to NRHP: April 10, 1980
- Designated CP: June 21, 1991
- Designated AHRS: January 4, 1979

The United Protestant Church, also known as The Church of a Thousand Trees, is a historic church located at the corner of South Denali Street and East Elmwood Avenue in Palmer, Alaska. Formerly a non-denominational Protestant church, it later became a Presbyterian church. It is a rustic log two-story structure, in the shape of a cross. A small bell tower with a dormer roof rises just above the main entrance. The interior is shaped from rustic log elements, with carved pews. The church property includes a manse and garage, built from similar materials.

The church was listed on the National Register of Historic Places in 1980.

== See also ==
- National Register of Historic Places listings in Matanuska-Susitna Borough, Alaska
