= Patten Colony Farm =

- U.S. National Register of Historic Places
- U.S. Historic district
- Alaska Heritage Resources Survey
- Location within Alaska
- Location: Mile 39.9 of the Glenn Highway, about 1.7 miles (2.7 km) southwest of Palmer, Alaska
- Coordinates: 61°34′43″N 149°08′29″W
- Area: 40 acres (16 ha)
- Built: 1940
- Built by: Works Progress Administration
- Architect: David Williams
- MPS: Settlement and Economic Development of Alaska's Matanuska--Susitna Valley MPS
- NRHP reference No.: 91000776
- AHRS No.: ANC-472
- Added to NRHP: June 21, 1991

The Patten Colony Farm is a historic farm property near Palmer, Alaska. It is located near milepost 39.9 on the Glenn Highway, and is a relatively complete instance of a farmstead established in the 1930s as part of the Matanuska Valley Colony initiative. The complex consists of eight buildings, six of which were built in the 1930s. The main house is an L-shaped log structure with a concrete foundation, a rarity in the colony. Smaller outbuildings include a log outhouse, a chicken house, and two barns, one of which is the only surviving horse barn (out of two built) of the colony.

The property was listed on the National Register of Historic Places in 1991.

== See also ==
- National Register of Historic Places listings in Matanuska-Susitna Borough, Alaska
