= Herried House =

Historic house in Alaska, United States

- U.S. National Register of Historic Places
- Alaska Heritage Resources Survey
- Location within Alaska
- Location: 4400 North Palmer-Fishook Road
- Nearest city: Palmer, Alaska
- Coordinates: 61°37′41″N 149°10′13″W
- Area: less than one acre
- Built: 1935
- Built by: Works Progress Administration
- Architect: David Williams
- MPS: Settlement and Economic Development of Alaska's Matanuska--Susitna Valley MPS
- NRHP reference No.: 91000778
- AHRS No.: ANC-198
- Added to NRHP: June 21, 1991

The Herried House, also known as Grow House, is a historic house at 4400 North Palmer-Fishook Road, near Palmer, Alaska. It is a 1 1/2-story log structure, built from pre-cut logs that were assembled on site. The walls are three-sided logs, notched at the corners, with the gaps filled by burlap and caulking. To the west side of the main block is a wood-frame garage which has log siding. The house was built in 1935 by the Works Progress Administration as part of the Matanuska Valley Colony, and is one of its best-preserved survivors. The first owners, Leonard and Ellie Herried, lived there 1935–38.

The house was listed on the National Register of Historic Places in 1991.

== See also ==
- National Register of Historic Places listings in Matanuska-Susitna Borough, Alaska
