= Alaska State Fair =

Annual state fair held in Palmer, Alaska

Coordinates: 61°34′53″N 149°07′52″W

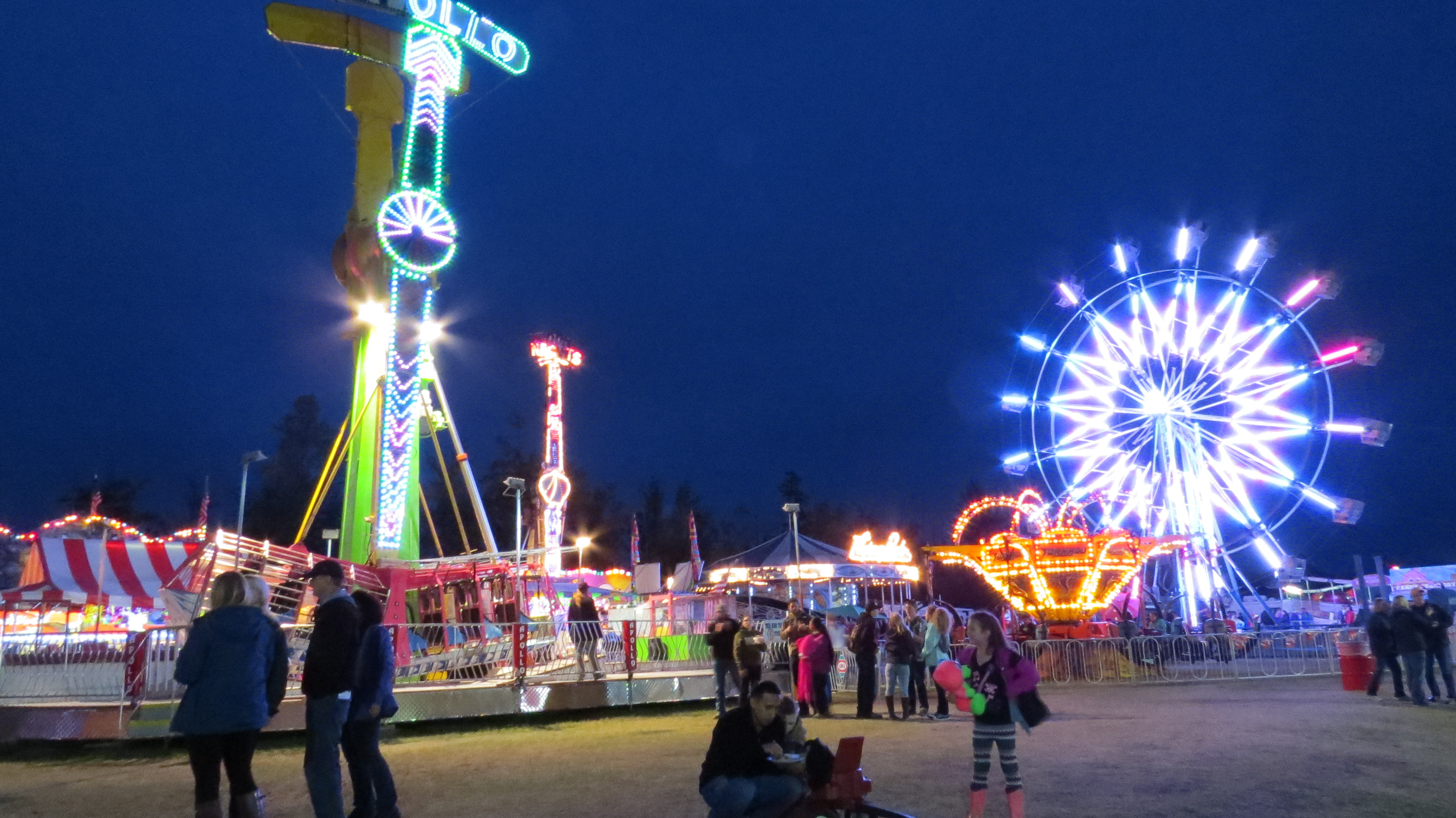
- Alaska State Fair in September 2015
- Genre: State fair
- Dates: Appx. 12 days in late August and early September
- Locations: Palmer, Alaska
- Years active: 1936–1941, 1947-2019, 2021-, officially Alaska State Fair since 1959
- Attendance: 0 (2020); Appx. 294,500 (2016)
- Website: alaskastatefair.org

The Alaska State Fair is an annual state fair held in Palmer, Alaska, United States. The fairgrounds are located approximately one hour north of Anchorage and draw visitors from the entire Municipality of Anchorage and beyond for the popular 1½-week event beginning at the end of August. The fair is famous for its record setting giant vegetables and picturesque location at the foot of the Chugach Mountains in the Matanuska-Susitna Valley. The event features amusement rides, food concessions, competitive exhibits, carnival games, live performances and more.

== History ==
The first Alaska State Fair was held September 4–7, 1936. It was organized by members of the Northland Pioneer Grange No. 1, an agricultural fraternal organization, that was organized in the Matanuska Valley in 1933. Planning for the fair began in 1935 and coincided with establishment of the Matanuska Colony, a New Deal resettlement community designed to assist out of work Midwestern families. In establishing a colony in the Matanuska-Susitna Valley it was the U.S. government's intent to decrease Alaska's reliance on imported food, increase the Territory's population, and give Midwestern families on public assistance a new start.

That first year's fair was held in the community center of the newly established Matanuska Colony and included the crowning of the fair queen, a baby show, boxing matches, horse races, dances, a rodeo and baseball games. There were also agricultural entries, including giant cabbages, grain, carrots, onions, celery, peas and other vegetables.

During World War II, the fair took a five-year hiatus from 1942 to 1946. But the fair was back in operation in 1947. 1950 saw the first carnival rides at the fair. In 1956, the fair Board petitioned the Alaska Legislature for official designation as the Alaska State Fair. In 1960, the fair celebrated its 25th anniversary and was paid a visit by President John F. Kennedy.

1967 was the fair's first year in its present 300-acre location at 2075 Glenn Highway in Palmer. The total attendance that year reached 72,000. Over the years, fair attendance has continued its upward trend. During the 18-day fair in 1998, a record 361,804 people participated in the event. That same year, the fair accepted 10,890 exhibit entries – the highest on record. The fair set another record in 2003, with 312,419 visitors attending the fair over a 12-day period.

Fairground facilities have also continued to grow. In 1975, the fair became home to Colony Village, which preserves some of the historic buildings from the Valley's early days. In 1997, the construction of Pioneer Plaza and Raven Hall was completed. In 2004, the fair opened its new Green Gate and Railroad Depot.

In 2010, it was estimated a total of 290,119 people attended the fair, which featured 8,081 exhibit entries and 450 vendors.

Also in 2010, Valley resident and protester Sidney Hill was arrested for fourth-degree assault, disorderly conduct and trespassing after he caused a disturbance on the fairgrounds while carrying a large political sign. The incident was addressed on the fair blog, and subsequent articles regarding Mr. Hill's activities were published in the Anchorage Daily News and The Frontiersman.

In 2020, there was not a state fair, due to the coronavirus pandemic.

=== Recent attendance figures ===
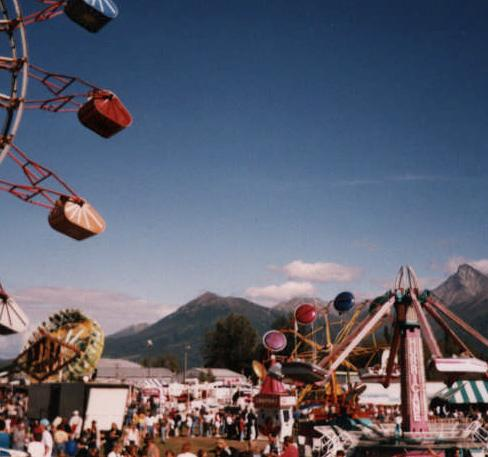
The Alaska State Fair, 2005.

Fair Attendance
Year	Visitors
2024	370,485
2023	356,179
2022	340,000
2021	305,428
2020	cancelled
2019	303,989
2018	292,973
2017	281,129
2016	293,424
2015	299,698
2014	293,827
2013	288,499
2012	unavailable
2011	308,572
2010	290,119
2009	289,615
2008	295,530
2007	285,417
2006	268,143
2005	272,447
2004	287,196
2003	312,419
2002	307,908
2001	307,599
2000	304,270

Statistics are from Alaska State Fair annual reports.

== Attractions ==
Situated in the heart of the fertile Matanuska-Susitna Valley, the fair features giant vegetable exhibits, like 2010's pending world record-breaking 46-foot (14 m), 8-inch (20 cm) gourd vine, and the state record-breaking 39-inch (100 cm) bean, 83-inch (210 cm) gourd and 1,101-pound (500 kg) pumpkin.

The fair's giant cabbage contest tradition began in 1941, when a $25 prize was offered for the largest cabbage and Max Sherrod of the Valley took the prize with a 23-pounder (10.5 kg). The official Giant Cabbage Weigh-Off was established in 1995. In 2012, grower Scott Robb entered a 138.25 pound (63 kg) cabbage, which not only took first place, but also set a new world record.

In 2007, the fair's horticultural and farming sides received national attention, when the makers of the Public Broadcasting Service (PBS) program GardenSMART visited the fair to film a 30-minute segment.

Topping the list of fairgoer favorite pastimes is the fair’s food. Usually, between 50 and 70 food vendors are scheduled to attend the fair, offering usual American staples like hot dogs, pizza, burgers and nachos, plus the more ‘exotic’ selections including gyros, Alaskan seafood and all kinds of foods served fried or on a stick. There are, also, many desserts including ice cream, cream puffs and more. More than 400 retail (non-food) stalls and vendors are also present at the fair each year.

The fair also features thousands of exhibitions and competitions; categories include artwork, baking, canning, ceramics, dance, fiber/fleece, flowers and gardening displays, handiwork/needlework, home-brewing techniques, home improvement displays, honey & bee products, livestock judging, music (of various genres), pet agility courses, petting zoo, photography, poultry judging, quilting/sewing, rabbit showing, locally-crafted spirited beverages/soda pop, woodworking, and more.

The fair also features free entertainment around the grounds, with events and contests such as a rodeo, “Diaper Derby”, and the Alaska Grown Games. The fair also features a large midway with carnival rides and games, and presents big name concerts each year as part of the AT&T Borealis Concert Series.

=== Concerts ===
The AT&T Concert Series is a big draw for the fair, which has played host to dozens of bands and performers over the last 75 years.

Previous performers have included Ted Nugent, David Archuleta, Lonestar, Hinder, Shinedown, Boyz II Men, Darryl Worley, Collective Soul, Seether, Bucky Covington, Beach Boys, Bill Engvall, Rodney Atkins, Kansas, Gin Blossoms, The Rembrandts, Emerson Drive, Charlie Daniels Band, Craig Morgan, Terri Clark, Cheap Trick, Terry Fator, Uncle Kracker, Megadeth, Los Lobos, Toby Mac, Tanya Tucker, Tracy Byrd, Carman, Kenny Rogers, Howie Mandel, Chris Cagle, Chris LeDoux, REO Speedwagon, Sean Kingston, Tracy Lawrence, Three Days Grace, Mastodon, Jim Gaffigan, Iggy Azalea, Richie Havens, and Micky Dolenz.

== See also ==
- Matanuska Valley Colony
- Raymond Rebarchek Colony Farm, the adjoining property, which the fair has owned portions of since the late 20th century
- Tanana Valley State Fair
