= Old Willow Community Center =

- U.S. National Register of Historic Places
- Location within Alaska Location within North America
- Location: W. Willow Community Center Cir., Willow, Alaska
- Coordinates: 61°44′40″N 150°03′03″W
- Area: 8 acres (3.2 ha)
- Built: 1961
- NRHP reference No.: 100001695
- Added to NRHP: October 5, 2017

The Old Willow Community Center is a historic community building on West Willow Community Center Circle, off mile marker 69.7 of the Parks Highway in Willow, Alaska. It is a single-story log structure, measuring 60 by 40 feet (18 m × 12 m), built out of local spruce. It is covered by a broad aluminum gabled roof; the gable ends are finished in wooden shingles. The interior consists of a single large chamber. The building was constructed in 1961 as part of a community drive for a meeting space that was more spacious than the local railroad station. In 1992, it was moved a short way south of its original location, where the new community center and library now stand. The building continues to be used for community events.

The building was listed on the National Register of Historic Places in 2017.

== See also ==
- National Register of Historic Places listings in Matanuska-Susitna Borough, Alaska
