= Campbell House (Palmer, Alaska) =

Historic house in Alaska, United States

- U.S. National Register of Historic Places
- Alaska Heritage Resources Survey
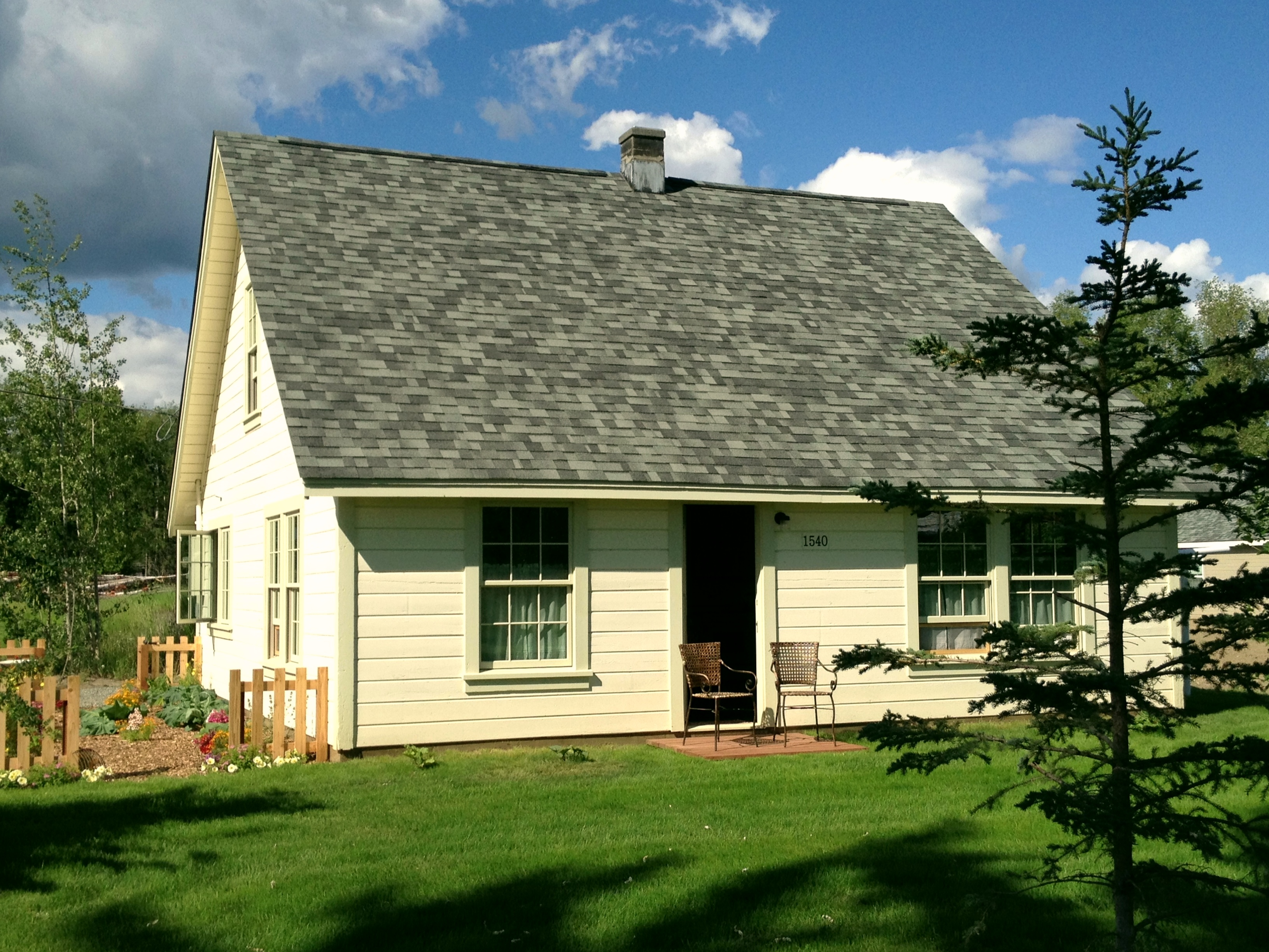

- Location within Alaska
- Location: 1540 Inner Springer Loop, Palmer, Alaska
- Coordinates: 61°34′15″N 149°07′38″W
- Area: less than one acre
- Built: 1935
- Built by: Works Progress Administration
- Architect: David Williams
- MPS: Settlement and Economic Development of Alaska's Matanuska--Susitna Valley MPS
- NRHP reference No.: 13000129
- AHRS No.: ANC-00503
- Added to NRHP: April 3, 2013

The Campbell House, also known as Colony House #54 and Campbell-Bouwens-Hamming House, is a historic house at 1540 Inner Springer Loop Road, near Palmer, Alaska. It is a simple 1 1/2-story wood-frame structure with a side gable roof. It was designed by architect and community planner David Williams, and built in 1935 as part of the Matanuska Valley Colony project. Of the 75 frame houses built as part of the colony, the Campbell House is one of the few that has survived, and is among the best-preserved. The Campbell House property also retains the original, now restored outhouse, and the chicken coop. At present time the Campbell House is the only colony home available to the public as a vacation rental.

The house was listed on the National Register of Historic Places in April 2013. It is owned by Quarter 54 Colony Rentals LLC.
