= Palmer Depot =

- U.S. National Register of Historic Places
- U.S. Historic district – Contributing property
- Alaska Heritage Resources Survey
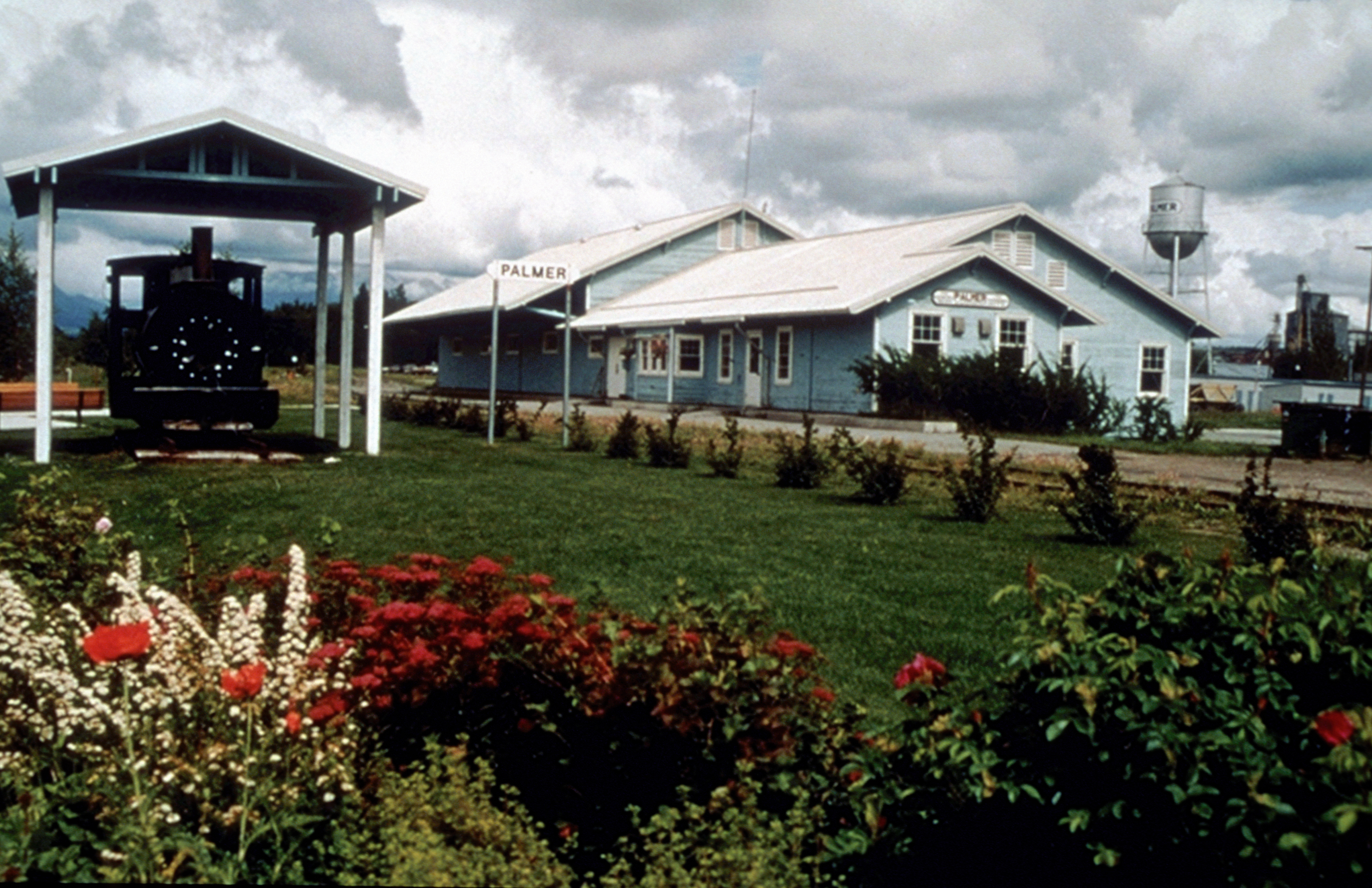

- Location within Alaska
- Location: Corner of Evergreen Avenue and South Valley Way, Palmer, Alaska
- Coordinates: 61°36′00″N 149°06′49″W
- Area: less than one acre
- Built: 1935
- Built by: Alaska Railroad
- Architect: A.M. Truesdell
- Part of: Matanuska Colony Community Center (ID91000773)
- NRHP reference No.: 78000530
- AHRS No.: ANC-089

Significant dates
- Added to NRHP: January 9, 1978
- Designated CP: June 21, 1991
- Designated AHRS: August 14, 1975

The Palmer Depot is a historic train station at South Valley Way and Evergreen Avenue in Palmer, Alaska. It is a large three-section single story frame structure, built in 1935 to provide transportation services to the newly established Matanuska Valley Colony. The main section is the former warehouse, which is 94 feet (29 m) long. The next section, with a lower profile than the warehouse, housed baggage facilities, a passenger waiting area, and living quarters for the station agent. The third section, the smallest of the three, houses the former ticketing office. The building now houses a community center.

The building was listed on the National Register of Historic Places in 1978 and was added as a contributing property to Matanuska Colony Community Center in 1991.

== See also ==
- National Register of Historic Places listings in Matanuska-Susitna Borough, Alaska
