= Hyland Hotel (Palmer, Alaska) =

- U.S. National Register of Historic Places
- Alaska Heritage Resources Survey
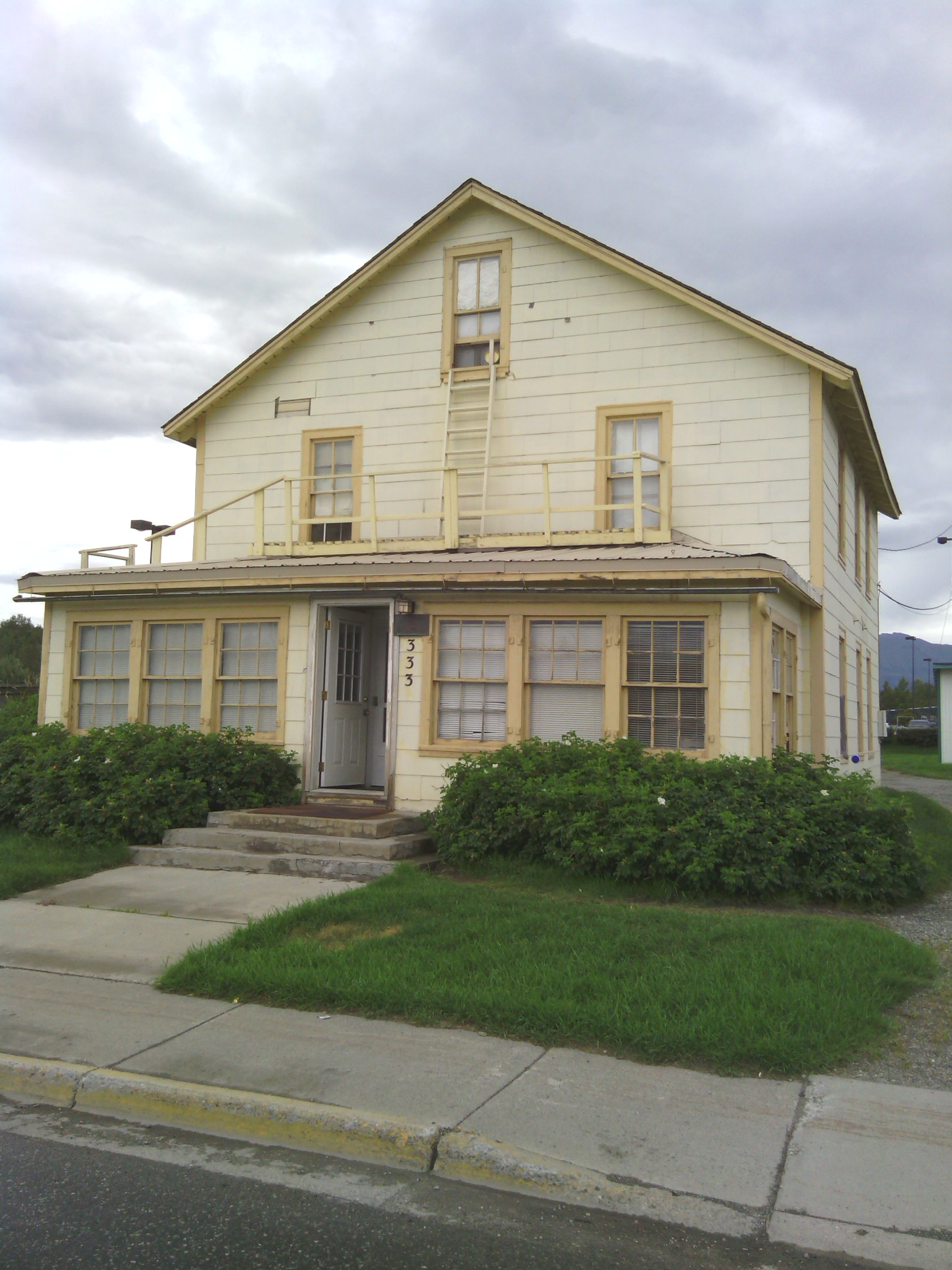

- Location within Alaska
- Location: 333 W Eveergreen Avenue, Palmer, Alaska
- Coordinates: 61°35′59″N 149°07′11″W
- Area: 0.25 acres (0.10 ha)
- Built: 1935
- Built by: Myles Hyland
- MPS: Settlement and Economic Development of Alaska's Matanuska--Susitna Valley MPS
- NRHP reference No.: 91000774
- AHRS No.: ANC-485
- Added to NRHP: June 21, 1991

The Hyland Hotel, also known as the Everglenn Hotel, is a historic hotel building at 333 Evergreen Avenue in Palmer, Alaska. It is a 2 1/2-story wood-frame structure with a front-gable roof, and a glass-enclosed porch extending across its front. The building was enlarged to the rear and resided in 1953. It was one of the first buildings erected in Palmer after the town was established in 1935. Myles and Joanna Hyland built the hotel, digging the foundation themselves, and using lumber salvaged from a mining camp dormitory. The Hylands ran the hotel until their respective deaths (Myles in 1949, Joanna in 1966).

The building was listed on the National Register of Historic Places in 1991.

== See also ==
- National Register of Historic Places listings in Matanuska-Susitna Borough, Alaska
