= Sutton-Alpine, Alaska =

Sutton-Alpine, Alaska Ts'es Tac'ilaexde
- Census-designated place
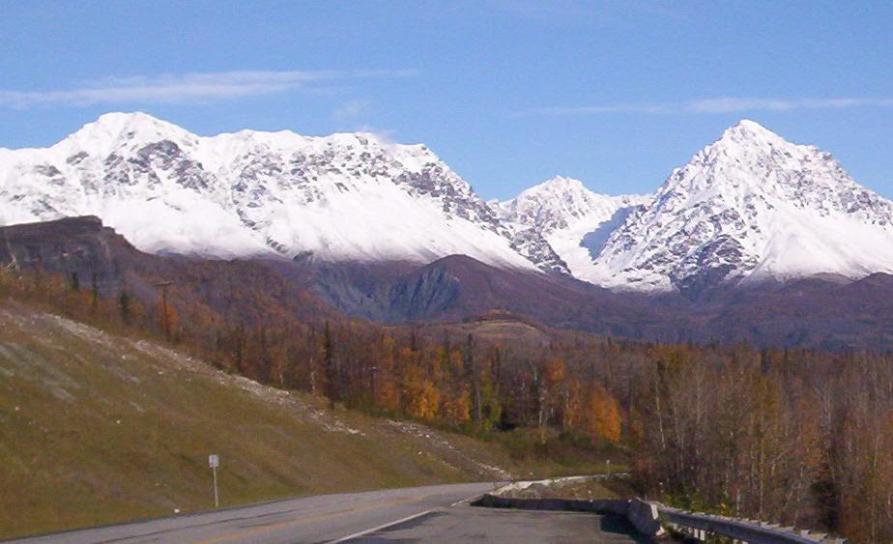
- Eska Mountain and Granite Peak surrounding Sutton in late fall

- Location in Matanuska-Susitna Borough and the state of Alaska

- Location within the state of Alaska
- Coordinates: 61°42′45″N 148°53′8″W
- Country: United States
- State: Alaska
- Borough: Matanuska-Susitna

Government
  - Borough mayor: Edna DeVries
  - State senator: Mike Shower (R)
  - State rep.: George Rauscher (R)

Area
  - Total: 58.14 sq mi (150.57 km^{2})
  - Land: 57.60 sq mi (149.19 km^{2})
  - Water: 0.54 sq mi (1.39 km^{2})

Population (2020)
  - Total: 1,038
  - Density: 18.0/sq mi (6.96/km^{2})
- Time zone: UTC-9 (Alaska (AKST))
  - Summer (DST): UTC-8 (AKDT)
- ZIP code: 99674
- Area code: 907
- FIPS code: 02-74525

Sutton (Ahtna: Ts'es Tac'ilaexde; Dena'ina: Ts'es Tuk'ilaght) is a census-designated place (CDP) in the Matanuska-Susitna Borough in the U.S. state of Alaska. At the 2020 census the population was 1,038, down from 1,447 in 2010. The CDP includes the former coal mining community and road construction camp of Sutton, as well as the former mining camps of Eska and Jonesville.

== Geography ==
Sutton-Alpine is located in southeastern Matanuska-Susitna Borough at 61°42′45″N 148°53′8″W (61.712473, -148.885625), 52–72 miles (84–116 km) northeast of Anchorage along the Glenn Highway. It sits along Alaska Route 1, the Glenn Highway, between Buffalo Soapstone to the west and Chickaloon to the east. The Matanuska River forms the southern edge of the CDP. Palmer, the borough seat, is 14 miles (23 km) to the southwest via the Glenn Highway.

According to the United States Census Bureau, the Sutton-Alpine CDP has a total area of 58.1 square miles (150 km^{2}), of which 57.6 square miles (149 km^{2}) are land and 0.5 square miles (1.3 km^{2}), or 0.92%, are water.

== Climate ==
Sutton has a continental subarctic climate (Köppen Dfc) with cold, snowy winters and mild summers.

Climate data for Sutton
Month	Jan	Feb	Mar	Apr	May	Jun	Jul	Aug	Sep	Oct	Nov	Dec	Year
Record high °F (°C)	49 (9)	54 (12)	55 (13)	78 (26)	82 (28)	85 (29)	85 (29)	85 (29)	73 (23)	67 (19)	49 (9)	52 (11)	85 (29)
Mean daily maximum °F (°C)	22.9 (−5.1)	28.2 (−2.1)	37.2 (2.9)	48.9 (9.4)	60.9 (16.1)	66.9 (19.4)	68 (20)	65.7 (18.7)	57.2 (14.0)	42.5 (5.8)	28.1 (−2.2)	23.6 (−4.7)	45.8 (7.7)
Mean daily minimum °F (°C)	9.1 (−12.7)	11.5 (−11.4)	17.3 (−8.2)	25 (−4)	32.4 (0.2)	40.7 (4.8)	46.3 (7.9)	44.1 (6.7)	35.9 (2.2)	25.9 (−3.4)	14.8 (−9.6)	10 (−12)	26.1 (−3.3)
Record low °F (°C)	−40 (−40)	−43 (−42)	−31 (−35)	−19 (−28)	11 (−12)	17 (−8)	29 (−2)	25 (−4)	12 (−11)	−21 (−29)	−27 (−33)	−36 (−38)	−43 (−42)
Average precipitation inches (mm)	1.08 (27)	1.04 (26)	0.83 (21)	0.54 (14)	0.86 (22)	1.47 (37)	2.48 (63)	2.95 (75)	3.04 (77)	1.66 (42)	1.54 (39)	1.54 (39)	19.04 (484)
Average snowfall inches (cm)	12.3 (31)	11 (28)	8.7 (22)	3.5 (8.9)	1 (2.5)	0 (0)	0 (0)	0 (0)	0.2 (0.51)	6.4 (16)	14 (36)	17.8 (45)	74.8 (190)
Average precipitation days	8	6	5	4	8	11	16	17	15	9	8	9	116

== Demographics ==
Historical population
Census	Pop.	Note	%±
1940	14		—
1960	162		—
1970	76		−53.1%
1980	182		139.5%
1990	308		69.2%
2000	1,080		250.6%
2010	1,447		34.0%
2020	1,038		−28.3%
U.S. Decennial Census

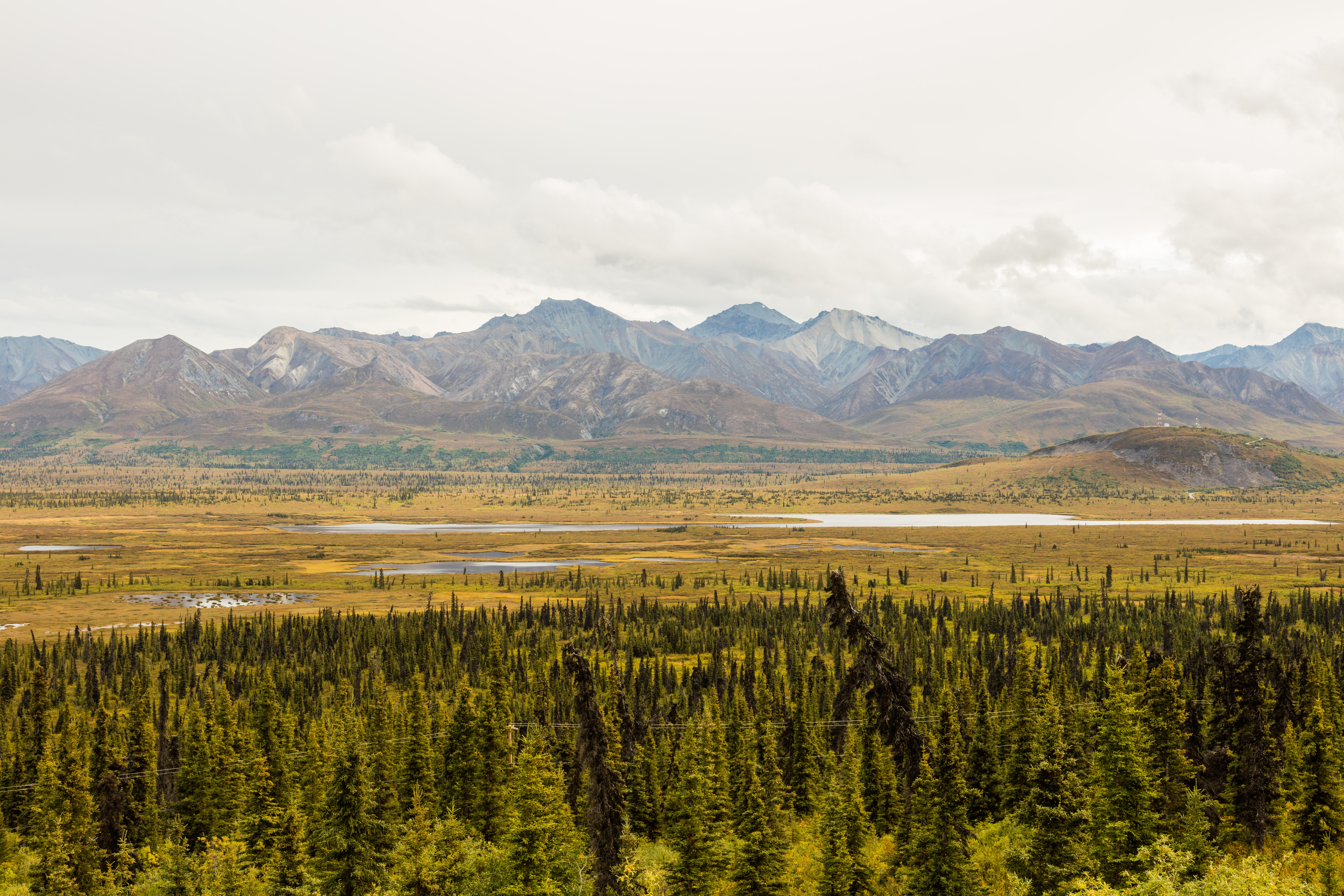
Landscape in Sutton

Sutton-Alpine first appeared on the 1940 U.S. Census as the unincorporated village of "Sutton." It did not appear on the 1950 census, but did return in 1960 and 1970. In 1980, Sutton was made a census-designated place (CDP). In 2000, the name was changed to the present Sutton-Alpine. The area of the CDP includes the aforementioned Sutton as well as the former mining villages of Eska (1950 pop: 54, 1960 pop.: 53) and Jonesville (1950 pop: 97).

=== 2020 census ===
As of the 2020 census, Sutton-Alpine had a population of 1,038. The median age was 44.0 years. 24.9% of residents were under the age of 18 and 20.7% of residents were 65 years of age or older. For every 100 females there were 98.1 males, and for every 100 females age 18 and over there were 95.0 males age 18 and over.

0.0% of residents lived in urban areas, while 100.0% lived in rural areas.

There were 409 households in Sutton-Alpine, of which 26.7% had children under the age of 18 living in them. Of all households, 51.6% were married-couple households, 23.2% were households with a male householder and no spouse or partner present, and 19.6% were households with a female householder and no spouse or partner present. About 30.6% of all households were made up of individuals and 12.7% had someone living alone who was 65 years of age or older.

There were 493 housing units, of which 17.0% were vacant. The homeowner vacancy rate was 0.6% and the rental vacancy rate was 12.6%.

Racial composition as of the 2020 census
Race	Number	Percent
White	751	72.4%
Black or African American	5	0.5%
American Indian and Alaska Native	76	7.3%
Asian	14	1.3%
Native Hawaiian and Other Pacific Islander	1	0.1%
Some other race	17	1.6%
Two or more races	174	16.8%
Hispanic or Latino (of any race)	38	3.7%

=== 2000 census ===
As of the census of 2000, there were 1,080 people, 278 households, and 179 families residing in the CDP. The population density was 7.1 inhabitants per square mile (2.7/km^{2}). There were 352 housing units at an average density of 2.3 per square mile (0.89/km^{2}). The racial makeup of the CDP was 67.50% White, 4.54% Black or African American, 22.41% Native American, 0.28% Asian, 0.37% Pacific Islander, 0.74% from other races, and 4.17% from two or more races. 1.57% of the population were Hispanic or Latino of any race.

There were 278 households, out of which 34.9% had children under the age of 18 living with them, 52.5% were married couples living together, 6.5% had a female householder with no husband present, and 35.3% were non-families. 29.5% of all households were made up of individuals, and 6.1% had someone living alone who was 65 years of age or older. The average household size was 2.53 and the average family size was 3.09.

In the CDP the population was spread out, with 19.3% under the age of 18, 9.8% from 18 to 24, 40.7% from 25 to 44, 25.0% from 45 to 64, and 5.2% who were 65 years of age or older. The median age was 37 years. For every 100 females, there were 208.6 males. For every 100 females age 18 and over, there were 261.8 males.

The median income for a household in the CDP was $35,652, and the median income for a family was $36,563. Males had a median income of $31,827 versus $28,750 for females. The per capita income for the CDP was $20,436. About 6.9% of families and 11.3% of the population were below the poverty line, including 15.8% of those under age 18 and 5.7% of those age 65 or over.

== History ==
The first people in Sutton were the Ahtna and Dena'ina Athabascans, who called Sutton Ts'es Tac'ilaexde and Ts'es Tuk'ilaght, respectively. In both languages, the name means 'where fish run among rocks'.

== See also ==
- Sutton Community Hall
