= Berry House (Palmer, Alaska) =

Historic house in Alaska, United States

- U.S. National Register of Historic Places
- Alaska Heritage Resources Survey
- Location within Alaska
- Location: 5805 North Farm Loop Road, Palmer, Alaska
- Coordinates: 61°38′42″N 149°08′53″W
- Area: less than one acre
- Built: 1935
- Built by: Works Progress Administration
- Architect: David Williams
- MPS: Settlement and Economic Development of Alaska's Matanuska--Susitna Valley MPS
- NRHP reference No.: 91000779
- AHRS No.: ANC-202
- Added to NRHP: June 21, 1991

The Berry House is a historic house at 5805 North Farm Loop Road, near Palmer, Alaska. It is a simple 1 1/2-story wood-frame structure with a gable roof. It was designed by architect and community planner David Williams, and built in 1935 as part of the Matanuska Valley Colony project. Despite a rearward extension in 1971, the building is a well-preserved example of the type of housing built as part of this New Deal project. The house is named for James Berry, one of the project participants who was the house's third occupant.

The house was listed on the National Register of Historic Places in 1991. It is owned by the National Outdoor Leadership School.
