= Matanuska Colony Community Center =

- U.S. National Register of Historic Places
- U.S. Historic district
- Alaska Heritage Resources Survey
- Location within Alaska
- Location: Roughly bounded by South Colony Way, East Firewood Avenue, South Eklutna Street, East Elmwood Avenue, South Denali Street and a line of properties along East Dahlia Avenue, Palmer, Alaska
- Coordinates: 61°35′56″N 149°06′34″W
- Area: 8 acres (3.2 ha)
- Built: 1940
- Built by: Works Progress Administration
- Architect: David Williams
- MPS: Settlement and Economic Development of Alaska's Matanuska--Susitna Valley MPS
- NRHP reference No.: 91000773
- AHRS No.: ANC-750
- Added to NRHP: June 21, 1991

The Matanuska Colony Community Center, also Palmer Historic District, is a cluster of buildings near the center of Palmer, Alaska, that were the centerpiece of the Depression-era Matanuska Valley Colony. This federal rural resettlement program was intended to give needy families resources and land to improve their condition. The colony's buildings were erected beginning in 1935, and those that survive represent a well-preserved example of government community planning. It is centered on a city block bounded by East Dahlia Avenue, South Valley Way, South Denali Street, and East Elmwood Avenue, and extends to the north and south. The buildings on this block are organized around a grassy quadrangle, laid out in 1935. Prominent buildings include the Palmer Depot and three churches, located in the block just southeast of the quadrangle, one of which, the United Protestant Church, is a distinctive log structure. The colony's Central School, now added to several times, houses the offices of the Matanuska-Susitna Borough.

The area was listed on the National Register of Historic Places in 1991.

== Demographics ==
The Matanuska Valley Colony Community Center was returned on the 1940 U.S. Census as the Alaska Railroad Colony Community Center (unincorporated). It had a population of 94. It has since been annexed into the city of Palmer.

Historical population
| Census | Pop. | Note | %± |
|---|---|---|---|
| 1940 | 94 | | — |
U.S. Decennial Census

== See also ==
- National Register of Historic Places listings in Matanuska-Susitna Borough, Alaska
