= David Williams (Alaska architect) =

American architect

David Williams was an American architect and community planner. He worked in the Washington, D.C. office of Federal Emergency Relief Administration (FERA).

Early in his professional career he worked in Tampico, Mexico for Gulf Oil as a civil engineer. He designed a building for prefabrication that was widely used by Gulf and other oil companies.

In 1935, he met with President Franklin D. Roosevelt, who was "fascinated" with David's ideas.

A number of his works are listed on the U.S. National Register of Historic Places.

Works include:

- Berry House, 5805 N. Farm Loop Rd., Palmer, Alaska (Williams, David), NRHP-listed
- Bailey Colony Farm, 3150 N. Glenn Hwy., Palmer, Alaska (Williams, David), NRHP-listed
- Herried House, 4400 N. Palmer-Fishook Hwy., Palmer, Alaska (Williams, David), NRHP-listed
- Matanuska Colony Community Center, roughly bounded by S. Colony, E. Firewood, S. Eklutua, E. Elmwood, S. Denali and a line N of properties on E. Dahlia, Palmer, Alaska (Williams, David), NRHP-listed
- Patten Colony Farm, Mi. 39.9 Glenn Hwy., across from State Fairground, Palmer, Alaska (Williams, David), NRHP-listed
