= Knik Site =

- U.S. National Register of Historic Places
- Alaska Heritage Resources Survey
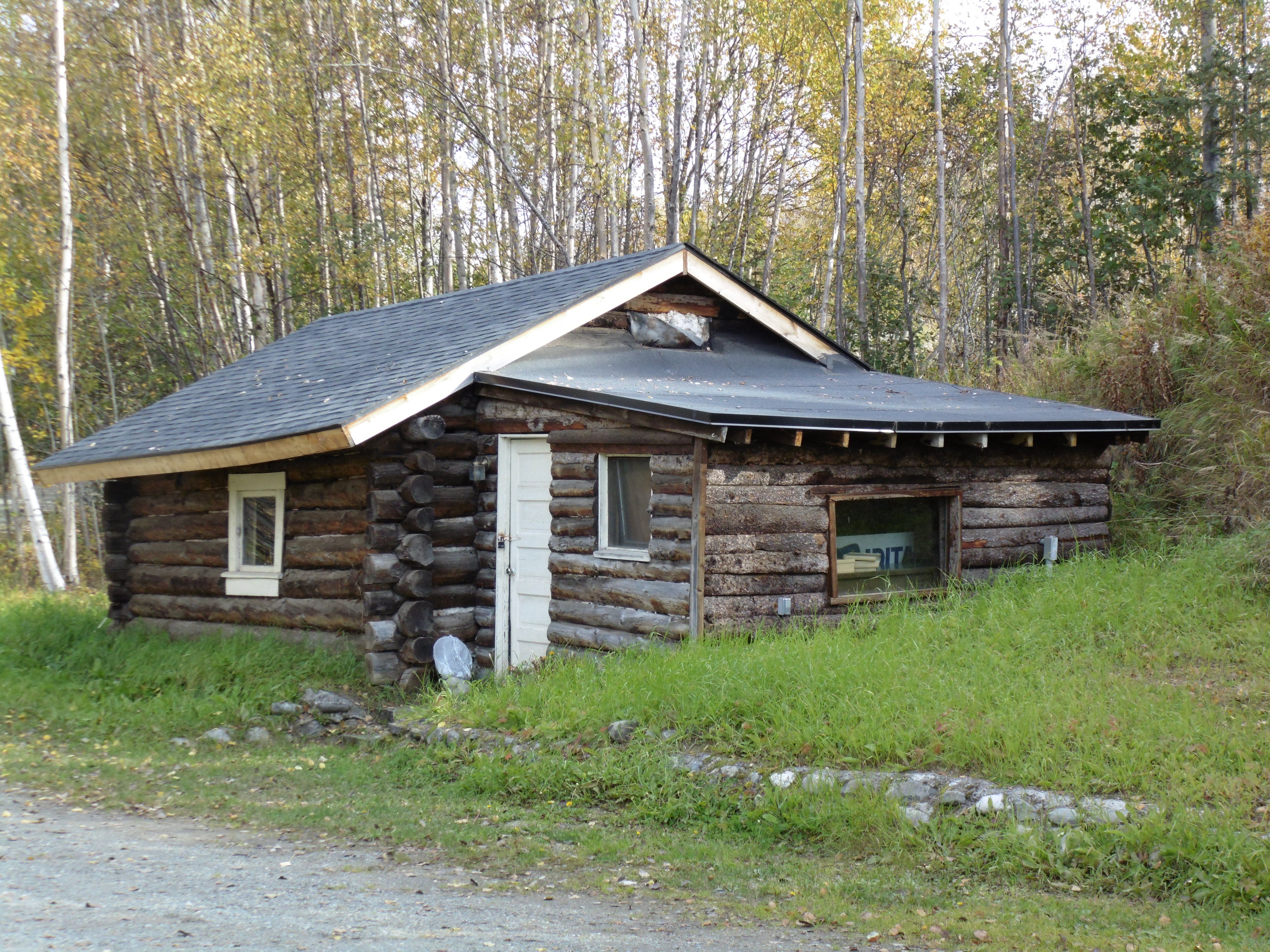
- The surviving cabin at Knik

- Location within Alaska
- Location: Along South Knik Goose Bay Road, about 13 miles (21 km) southwest of Wasilla, Alaska
- Coordinates: 61°27′27″N 149°43′52″W
- Area: 9 acres (3.6 ha)
- Built: 1898
- NRHP reference No.: 73000379
- AHRS No.: ANC-003
- Added to NRHP: July 24, 1973

The Knik Site, (Dena'ina: K'enakatnu) also known as the Old Knik Townsite, is the location in Matanuska-Susitna Borough, Alaska, that was once home to the largest settlement on Cook Inlet. The only surviving remnants of the community are a former log roadhouse that has become a museum operated by the Wasilla-Knik Historical Society, and a log cabin. The Knik area had long been a meeting point of Native Alaskans, and in 1898 it became the principal community on Cook Inlet from which goods were shipped into the interior. In 1916 the Alaska Railroad reached the site of present-day Anchorage, bypassing Knik and leading to Anchorage's growth. When the railroad reached Wasilla, Knik lost all importance as a transshipment point, and its buildings were either abandoned or moved to one of the other communities. Knik is located about 13 miles (21 km) southwest of Wasilla.

The two surviving buildings were listed on the National Register of Historic Places in 1973.

== See also ==
- National Register of Historic Places listings in Matanuska-Susitna Borough, Alaska
