= AK92 =

AK92 may refer to:

== Places ==
- Martin Field Airport (Alaska) (FAA airport code "AK92"), an airport in Lazy Mountain, Alaska, U.S.

== Other uses ==
- USS Eridanus (AK-92), a 1943 ship
