= Lazy Mountain, Alaska =

- CDP
- Emergency repairs to Clark-Wolverine Road following the 2018 Anchorage earthquake

- Location in Matanuska-Susitna Borough and the state of Alaska

- Location within the state of Alaska
- Coordinates: 61°37′32″N 149°2′42″W
- Country: United States
- State: Alaska
- Borough: Matanuska-Susitna

Government
  - Borough mayor: Edna DeVries
  - State senators: Shelley Hughes (R); Mike Shower (R)
  - State reps.: DeLena Johnson (R); George Rauscher (R)

Area
  - Total: 58.80 sq mi (152.28 km^{2})
  - Land: 58.63 sq mi (151.86 km^{2})
  - Water: 0.16 sq mi (0.42 km^{2})
- Elevation: 2,726 ft (831 m)

Population (2020)
  - Total: 1,506
  - Density: 25.7/sq mi (9.92/km^{2})
- Time zone: UTC-9 (Alaska (AKST))
  - Summer (DST): UTC-8 (AKDT)
- Area code: 907
- FIPS code: 02-43260
- GNIS feature ID: 1866958

Lazy Mountain is a census-designated place (CDP) in Matanuska-Susitna Borough, Alaska, United States. Located east of Palmer along the Matanuska River. At the 2020 census the population was 1,506, up from 1,479 in 2010.

== Geography ==
Lazy Mountain, the namesake geographic feature of the Lazy Mountain area, is located at 61°37′32″N 149°02′42″W. The peak of Lazy Mountain is 3,720 feet (1,130 metres) above sea level.

According to the United States Census Bureau, the 2010 CDP has a total area of 58.82 square miles (152.3 km^{2}) (up from 35.7 in 2000), of which, 35.5 square miles (92 km^{2}) of it is land and 0.2 square miles (0.52 km^{2}) of it is water.

The southern boundary of the CDP starts at the Old Glenn Highway where it meets E. Smith Rd, extends east along the Smith Road extension to Harmony Avenue, then south one block to Purser Place and then east again approximately 1/2 mile along an imaginary line to McRoberts Creek. McRoberts Creek forms the southeast boundary of the CDP up to its headwaters and to the top of the ridge south of Matanuska Peak. The east boundary forms an irregular line along the ridge to Matanuska Peak, then down to the glacier and along its outfall creek to where it meets Wolverine Creek.

== Climate ==
Lazy Mountain has a continental subarctic climate (Köppen Dfc) with cold, snowy winters and mild summers.

Climate data for Lazy Mountain
| Month | Jan | Feb | Mar | Apr | May | Jun | Jul | Aug | Sep | Oct | Nov | Dec | Year |
|---|---|---|---|---|---|---|---|---|---|---|---|---|---|
| Record high °F (°C) | 53 (12) | 55 (13) | 54 (12) | 72 (22) | 77 (25) | 82 (28) | 82 (28) | 84 (29) | 71 (22) | 66 (19) | 53 (12) | 53 (12) | 84 (29) |
| Mean daily maximum °F (°C) | 22.7 (−5.2) | 28.2 (−2.1) | 33.8 (1.0) | 45.8 (7.7) | 57.5 (14.2) | 63.5 (17.5) | 65.4 (18.6) | 63.2 (17.3) | 55 (13) | 41.2 (5.1) | 27.1 (−2.7) | 24.9 (−3.9) | 44 (7) |
| Mean daily minimum °F (°C) | 8.2 (−13.2) | 10.4 (−12.0) | 13.2 (−10.4) | 24.5 (−4.2) | 34.4 (1.3) | 42.3 (5.7) | 46.9 (8.3) | 44.2 (6.8) | 36.1 (2.3) | 24.7 (−4.1) | 13.1 (−10.5) | 11.1 (−11.6) | 25.8 (−3.4) |
| Record low °F (°C) | −38 (−39) | −34 (−37) | −24 (−31) | −11 (−24) | 20 (−7) | 29 (−2) | 35 (2) | 29 (−2) | 12 (−11) | −3 (−19) | −18 (−28) | −26 (−32) | −38 (−39) |
| Average precipitation inches (mm) | 1.04 (26) | 1.05 (27) | 0.88 (22) | 0.5 (13) | 0.89 (23) | 1.34 (34) | 2.05 (52) | 3.11 (79) | 2.96 (75) | 1.79 (45) | 1.36 (35) | 1.68 (43) | 18.67 (474) |
| Average snowfall inches (cm) | 14.1 (36) | 13.4 (34) | 10.5 (27) | 4.1 (10) | 0.7 (1.8) | 0 (0) | 0 (0) | 0 (0) | 0.4 (1.0) | 6.7 (17) | 14.5 (37) | 19.6 (50) | 84.1 (214) |
| Average precipitation days | 8 | 7 | 7 | 4 | 7 | 10 | 14 | 16 | 14 | 10 | 9 | 10 | 116 |

== Demographics ==
Historical population
| Census | Pop. | Note | %± |
|---|---|---|---|
| 1990 | 838 | | — |
| 2000 | 1,158 | | 38.2% |
| 2010 | 1,479 | | 27.7% |
| 2020 | 1,506 | | 1.8% |
U.S. Decennial Census

Lazy Mountain first appeared on the 1990 U.S. Census as a census-designated place (CDP).

=== 2020 census ===
As of the 2020 census, Lazy Mountain had a population of 1,506. The median age was 40.6 years. 24.2% of residents were under the age of 18 and 18.7% of residents were 65 years of age or older. For every 100 females there were 101.1 males, and for every 100 females age 18 and over there were 101.9 males age 18 and over.

0.0% of residents lived in urban areas, while 100.0% lived in rural areas.

There were 551 households in Lazy Mountain, of which 31.4% had children under the age of 18 living in them. Of all households, 57.5% were married-couple households, 18.7% were households with a male householder and no spouse or partner present, and 17.1% were households with a female householder and no spouse or partner present. About 20.7% of all households were made up of individuals and 10.2% had someone living alone who was 65 years of age or older.

There were 666 housing units, of which 17.3% were vacant. The homeowner vacancy rate was 0.6% and the rental vacancy rate was 20.7%.

Racial composition as of the 2020 census
| Race | Number | Percent |
|---|---|---|
| White | 1,306 | 86.7% |
| Black or African American | 2 | 0.1% |
| American Indian and Alaska Native | 47 | 3.1% |
| Asian | 7 | 0.5% |
| Native Hawaiian and Other Pacific Islander | 1 | 0.1% |
| Some other race | 20 | 1.3% |
| Two or more races | 123 | 8.2% |
| Hispanic or Latino (of any race) | 49 | 3.3% |

=== 2000 census ===
As of the census of 2000, there were 1,158 people, 410 households, and 303 families residing in the CDP. The population density was 32.6 inhabitants per square mile (12.6/km^{2}). There were 465 housing units at an average density of 13.1 per square mile (5.1/km^{2}). The racial makeup of the CDP was 92.66% White, 0.09% Black or African American, 2.94% Native American, 1.04% Asian, 0.17% from other races, and 3.11% from two or more races. 1.04% of the population were Hispanic or Latino of any race.

There were 410 households, out of which 40.7% had children under the age of 18 living with them, 63.7% were married couples living together, 6.6% had a female householder with no husband present, and 25.9% were non-families. 20.2% of all households were made up of individuals, and 5.6% had someone living alone who was 65 years of age or older. The average household size was 2.82, and the average family size was 3.30.

In the CDP, the population was spread out, with 31.6% under the age of 18, 5.7% from 18 to 24, 27.9% from 25 to 44, 28.2% from 45 to 64, and 6.6% who were 65 years of age or older. The median age was 36 years. For every 100 females, there were 114.4 males. For every 100 females aged 18 and over, there were 111.2 males.

The median income for a household in the CDP was $46,500, and the median income for a family was $54,881. Males had a median income of $37,179 versus $28,889 for females. The per capita income for the CDP was $22,789. About 3.3% of families and 7.8% of the population were below the poverty line, including 9.4% of those under age 18 and none of those age 65 or over.

== Government ==
As a Census-Designated Place, the Lazy Mountain Area is not a traditional village or town. It lies to the east of the nearest municipal area, Palmer. The area is part of the Matanuska-Susitna Borough, and as such is subject to borough control. The Lazy Mountain Community Council, which represents a similar but slightly smaller area than the Lazy Mountain CDP, provides feedback to the borough from some of the residents of the area. The Lazy Mountain Community Council submitted a Comprehensive Plan to the Borough Assembly, and it adopted by the Assembly in 2008.

== Parks and recreation ==
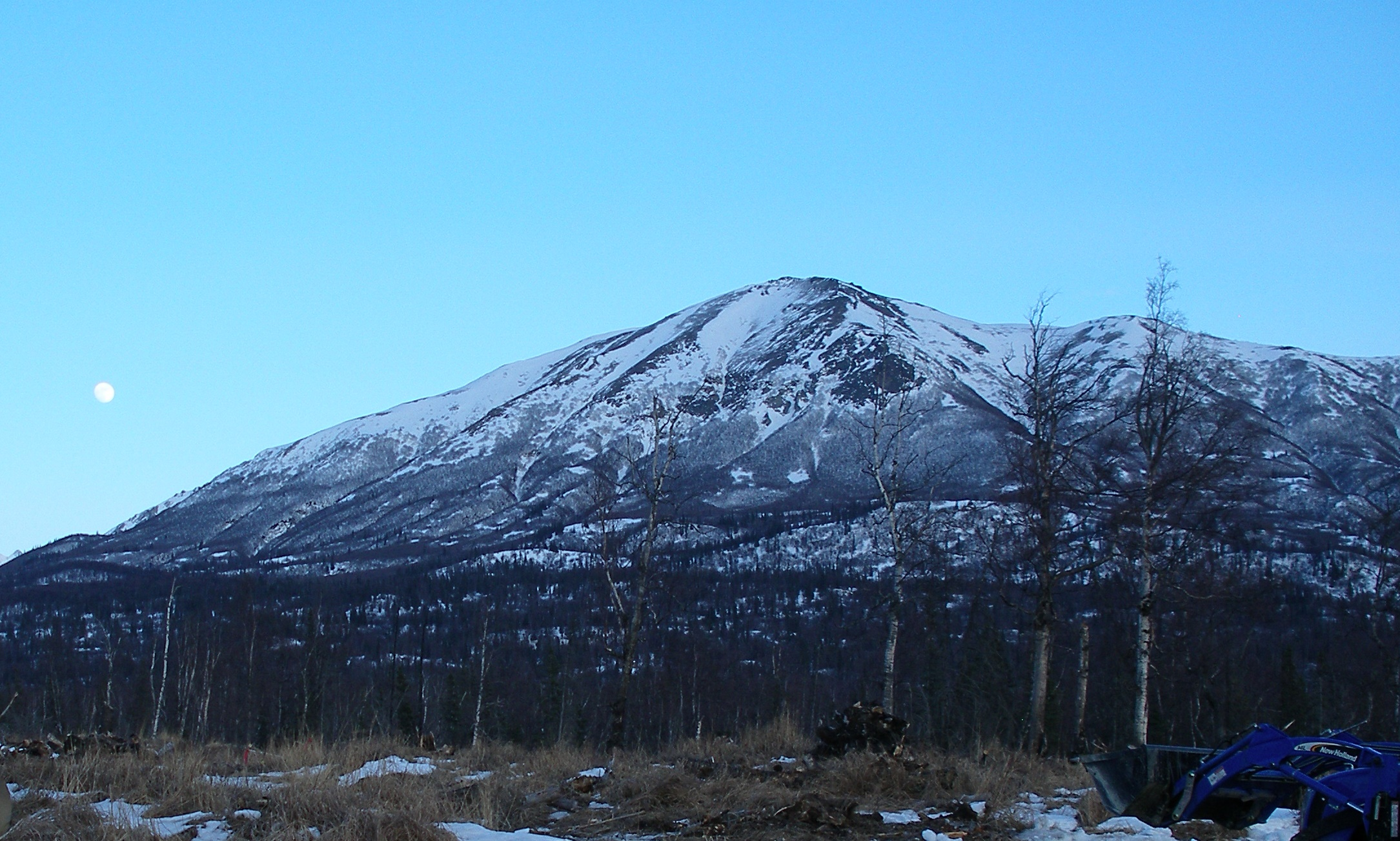
Lazy Mountain

=== Recreational facilities ===
The Lazy Mountain Recreation Area is a 360-acre site which has hiking, skiing, and equestrian trails. The parking area at the East end of Huntley Road provides access to the Morgan Horse, Lazy Moose and Lazy Mountain Trails.

== Transportation ==
=== Roads ===
The Lazy Mountain area is only accessible by road along the Old Glenn Highway, formerly Alaska Route 1. This section of the Glenn Highway was bypassed when the Glenn Highway was rerouted across the Knik and Matanuska Rivers and the Palmer Hay Flats in 1976. The Old Glenn Highway is now reached from the south at an interchange off of the Glenn Highway at milepost 29.6, or from Palmer where the Old Glenn becomes Arctic Avenue. The Old Glenn Highway is classified as a major collector South of Clark-Wolverine Road, and as a minor arterial from that point north into Palmer.

East Smith Road, which forms the southern boundary of the Lazy Mountain CDP, is considered a minor collector road for the first 1/2 mile from the Old Glenn Highway, as is Clark-Wolverine Road from the Old Glenn Highway all the way to where it becomes Wolverine Road, and on to N. McKenzie Drive

=== Air transport ===
The Lazy Mountain Area is served by numerous private airports. The following airports are registered with the FAA
Identifier Name

- AK46 ABI Airport
- AK88 Eagle Nest Airport
- AK92 Martin Field
- 7AK9 Vinduska Airport

and one Heliport

- 5AK4 Eagles Nest Heliport

At least three other unregistered landing areas exist in the Lazy Mountain area, one along the Old Glenn Highway between Eugene Drive and Clark-Wolverine Rd. and two near Huntley Road.

The nearest public airport is the Palmer Municipal Airport (PAQ).

Effective May 29, 2014, all airports in the Lazy Mountain area use a single common traffic advisory frequency (CTAF), 123.60 MHz. The nearest airport with scheduled commercial service is the Ted Stevens Anchorage International Airport (ANC).

== People ==
- Anna Marly, Russian-French singer-songwriter (1917–2006). She settled in Lazy Mountain where she became a US Citizen and died in Palmer.
