= Matanuska =

Matanuska may refer to:

- Matanuska Formation, the northern Chugach Mountains, Alaska
- Matanuska Glacier, in the Chugach Mountains, Alaska
- Matanuska Peak, a mountain summit in the Chugach Mountains, Alaska
- Matanuska River, in Alaska
- Matanuska-Susitna Borough, Alaska, in Alaska
- Matanuska-Susitna Valley, in Alaska
- Matanuska Valley Colony in Alaska
- M/V Matanuska, a vessel in the Alaska Marine Highway System
- Matanuska (crater), an impact crater on the minor planet 253 Mathilde
