= Martin Field =

Martin Field may refer to:

- Martin Field (Nebraska), an airport in South Sioux City, Nebraska, United States (FAA: 7K8)
- Martin Field (Texas), a stadium near the Texas Wesleyan University campus in Fort Worth, Texas, United States
- Martin Field (Washington), an airport in College Place, Washington, United States (FAA: S95)
- Martin Field (West Virginia), on the campus of West Virginia University Institute of Technology
- Martin Field Airport (Alaska), an airport in Lazy Mountain, Alaska, United States (FAA: AK92)
- Martin Scott Field (born 1955/56), bishop of the Episcopal Diocese of West Missouri

== See also ==
- Martin Airport (disambiguation)
