= Wolf Lake Airport, Alaska =

Wolf Lake Airport
- IATA: none; ICAO: none; FAA LID: 4AK6

Summary
- Airport type: Public
- Location: Palmer, Alaska
- Elevation AMSL: 572 ft / 174 m
- Coordinates: 61°38′22″N 149°17′11″W
- Website: http://wolflakeairport.biz/

Map
- Location in Alaska

Runways
Direction	Length		Surface
Direction	ft	m	Surface
06/24	3,800	1,158	Asphalt
18/36	2,600	792	Gravel

Wolf Lake Airport (FAA LID: 4AK6) is a privately owned, publicly used airport located in Palmer, Alaska. The airport is located between Palmer and Wasilla.

The airport was founded in 1982 by Maurice Wilson. The current owner, Barb Doty, took over the airport in 1997 with John Eshleman. The airport is managed by D. E. NorthFork LLC.

Wolf Lake airport has two runways: one is paved, with a length of 3,800 feet, and the second, gravel cross runway is 2,600 feet in length.

Wolf Lake Airport is a mixed-use community, with both residential and commercial-aviation operators.
