= Martin Airport =

Martin Airport may refer to:

- Martin Airport (Slovakia) in Martin, Slovakia (ICAO: LZMA)
- Martin Municipal Airport in Martin, South Dakota, United States (FAA: 9V6)
- Martin State Airport in Baltimore, Maryland, United States (FAA/IATA: MTN)
- Martin County Airport in Williamston, North Carolina, United States (FAA: MCZ)
- Ava Bill Martin Memorial Airport in Ava, Missouri, United States (FAA: AOV)
- Martin Field Airport (Alaska) in Lazy Mountain, Alaska, United States (FAA: AK92)

== See also ==
- Martin Field (disambiguation)
