= Matanuska Peak =

Mountain in Alaska

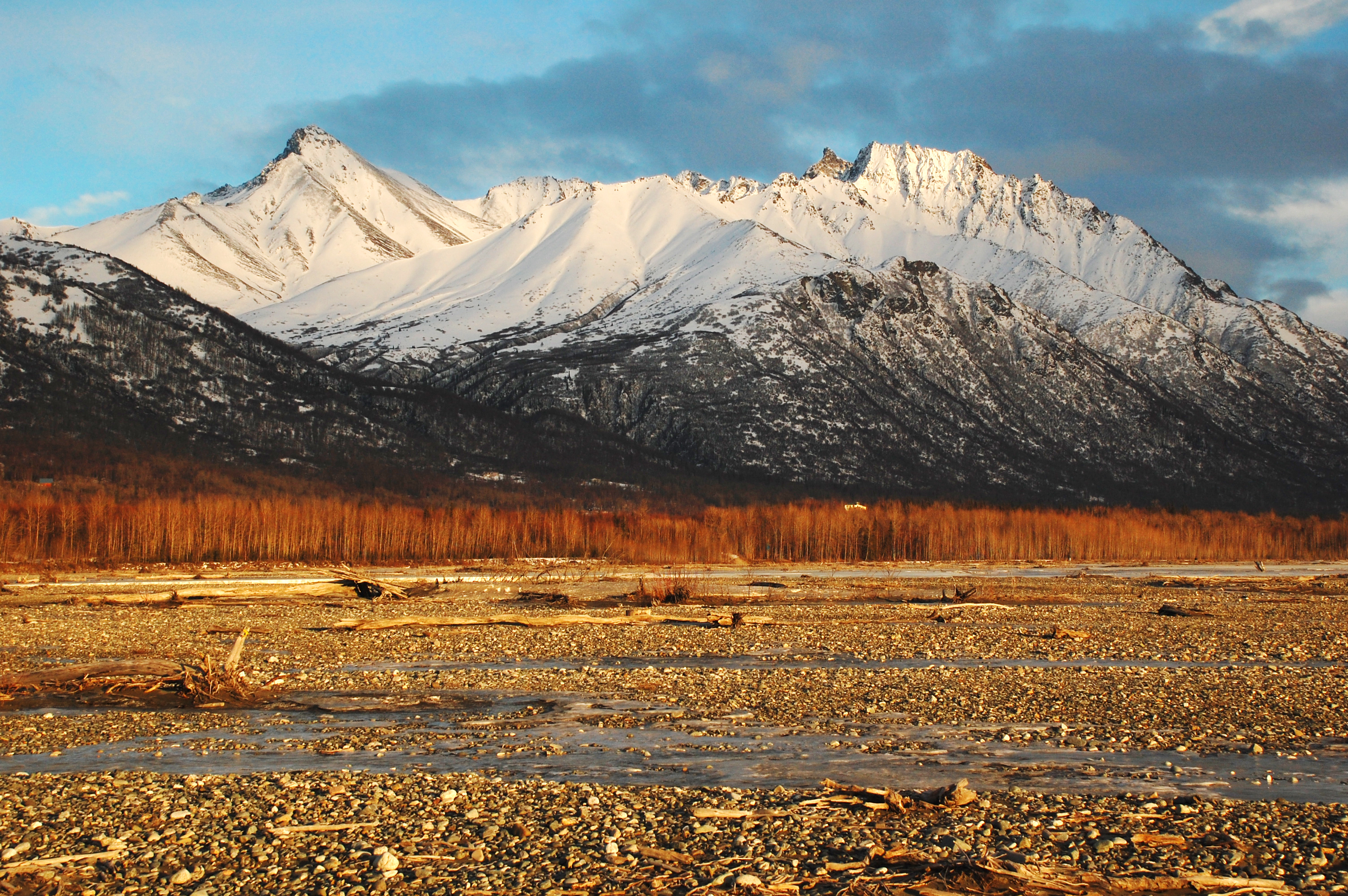
- Matanuska Peak (left) from near Palmer

Highest point
- Elevation: 6,093 ft (1,860 m)
- Prominence: 993 ft (303 m)
- Parent peak: Frontier Peak (6,250 ft)
- Isolation: 2.09 mi (3.36 km)
- Coordinates: 61°36′13″N 148°53′06″W

Geography
- Location within Alaska
- Interactive map of Matanuska Peak
- Location: Matanuska-Susitna Borough; Alaska, United States
- Parent range: Chugach Mountains
- Topo map: USGS Anchorage C-6

Climbing
- Easiest route: trail, class 2 scrambling

Matanuska Peak is a 6,093 ft (1,860 m) mountain summit located in the Chugach Mountains, in Matanuska-Susitna Borough in the U.S. state of Alaska. The mountain is a major landmark in the Matanuska Valley, situated 7.5 mi (12 km) east of Palmer, and 10 mi (16 km) north-northeast of Pioneer Peak. The nearest higher peak is Frontier Peak, 2.1 mi (3 km) to the southeast. Matanuska Peak's name was officially approved in 1969 by the United States Geological Survey, and derives from the Matanuska River, a native name on maps since 1897. "Matanuska" is derived from the Russian term for the "copper river people". The Matanuska Peak Trail is a five mile one-way hike with 5,670 feet of elevation gain and minor scrambling. The months June through October offer the most favorable weather and snow-free trail conditions to climb this peak. The Matanuska Peak Challenge is a strenuous race run in August each year.

== Climate ==
Based on the Köppen climate classification, Matanuska Peak is located in a subarctic climate zone with long, cold, snowy winters, and mild summers. Temperatures can drop below −20 °C with wind chill factors below −30 °C. Precipitation runoff from the peak drains into tributaries of the Matanuska River, which in turn is a tributary of the Knik River.

== Gallery ==
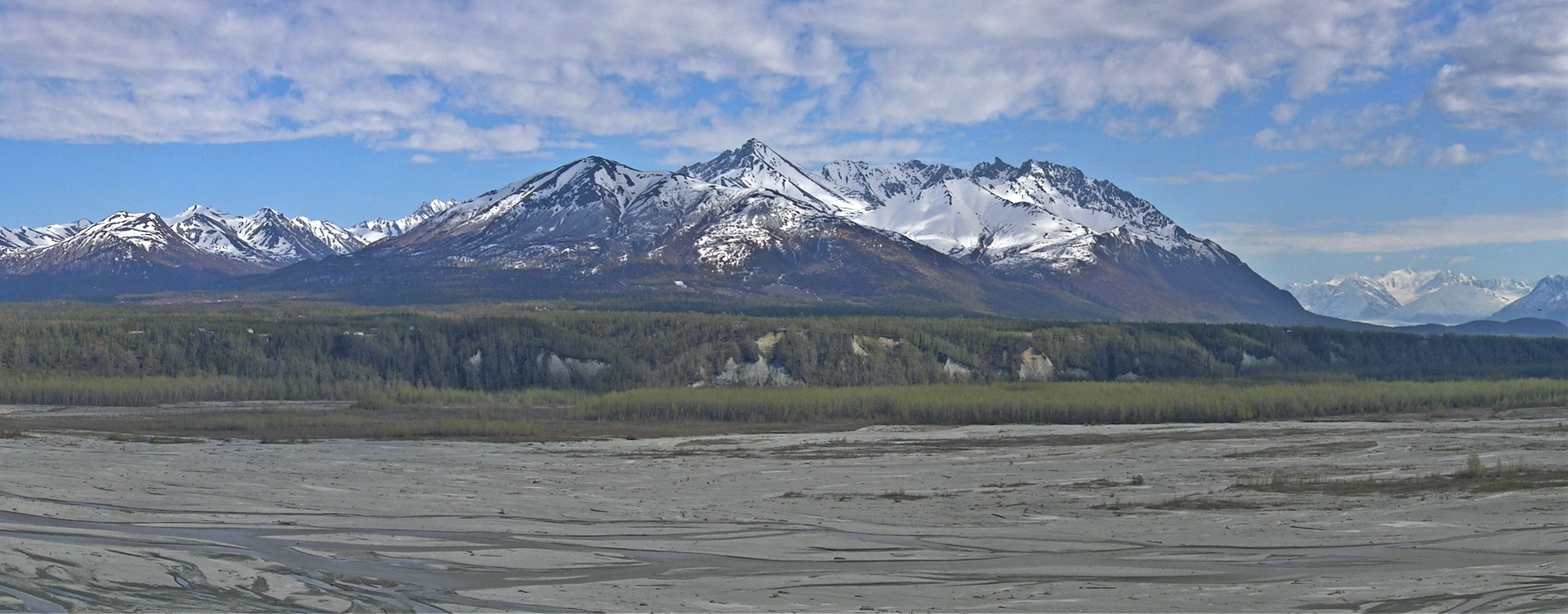
Matanuska Peak and Lazy Mountain

== See also ==
- List of mountain peaks of Alaska
- Geology of Alaska
