= Anna Marly =

Russian singer-songwriter (1917–2006)

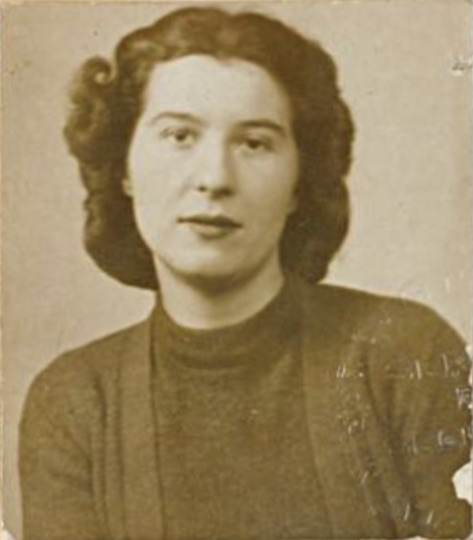
- Marly in 1942
- Born: Anna Yurievna Betulinskaya; 30 October 1917; Petrograd, Russia
- Died: 15 February 2006 (aged 88); Palmer, Alaska, US
- Occupations: Singer; songwriter
- Spouse(s): Jhr. Johan van Doorn, Yuri Smirnov
- Awards: Chevalier of the Legion of Honour (1985); Knight of the Ordre national du Mérite
- Musical career
- Years active: 1932–2000
- Label: Various labels

Anna Marly (Russian: Анна Юрьевна Смирнова-Марли, romanized: Anna Yurievna Smirnova-Marli; 30 October 1917 – 15 February 2006), born Anna Yurievna Betulinskaya, was a Russian-born French singer-songwriter and guitarist. Born into a wealthy Russian noble family, Marly came to France very young, just after her father was killed in the aftermath of the October Revolution.

She is best remembered as the composer of the "Chant des Partisans", a song that was used as the unofficial anthem of the Free French Forces during World War II; the popularity of the "Chant des Partisans" was such that it was proposed as a new national anthem after the conclusion of the war. She also wrote "La Complainte du Partisan" (known in English as "The Partisan"), which was later famously covered by Leonard Cohen and Joan Baez.

== Early life ==
Marly was born Anna Yurievna Betulinskaya (Анна Юрьевна Бетулинская) into the Russian noble Betulinsky family living in Saint Petersburg during the October Revolution. Her father Yuri Betulinsky (Юрий Бетулинский) belonged to an aristocratic family connected by family ties to monarchist prime minister Pyotr Stolypin, poet Mikhail Lermontov and philosopher Nicholas Berdyaev. Her mother Maria Mikhailovna Alferaki (Мария Михайловна Алфераки) was a descendant of the Greek-Russian noble Alferaki family who lived in Taganrog in the Alferaki Palace before moving to Saint Petersburg. Yuri Betulinski was arrested and executed in the post-revolution Red Terror before Marly's first birthday. The rest of the family, along with a number of other White Russian refugees, fled across the Finnish border shortly after this, eventually settling in the French town of Menton.

In her youth Marly worked as a ballet dancer in Monte Carlo, and was taught by the Russian composer Sergei Prokofiev. By the age of 17 she was performing her own compositions in the cabaret clubs of Paris, it was at this time that she adopted the name "Marly", selecting it from a telephone directory, her original name Betoulinsky being too difficult for French speakers to pronounce.

== War years ==
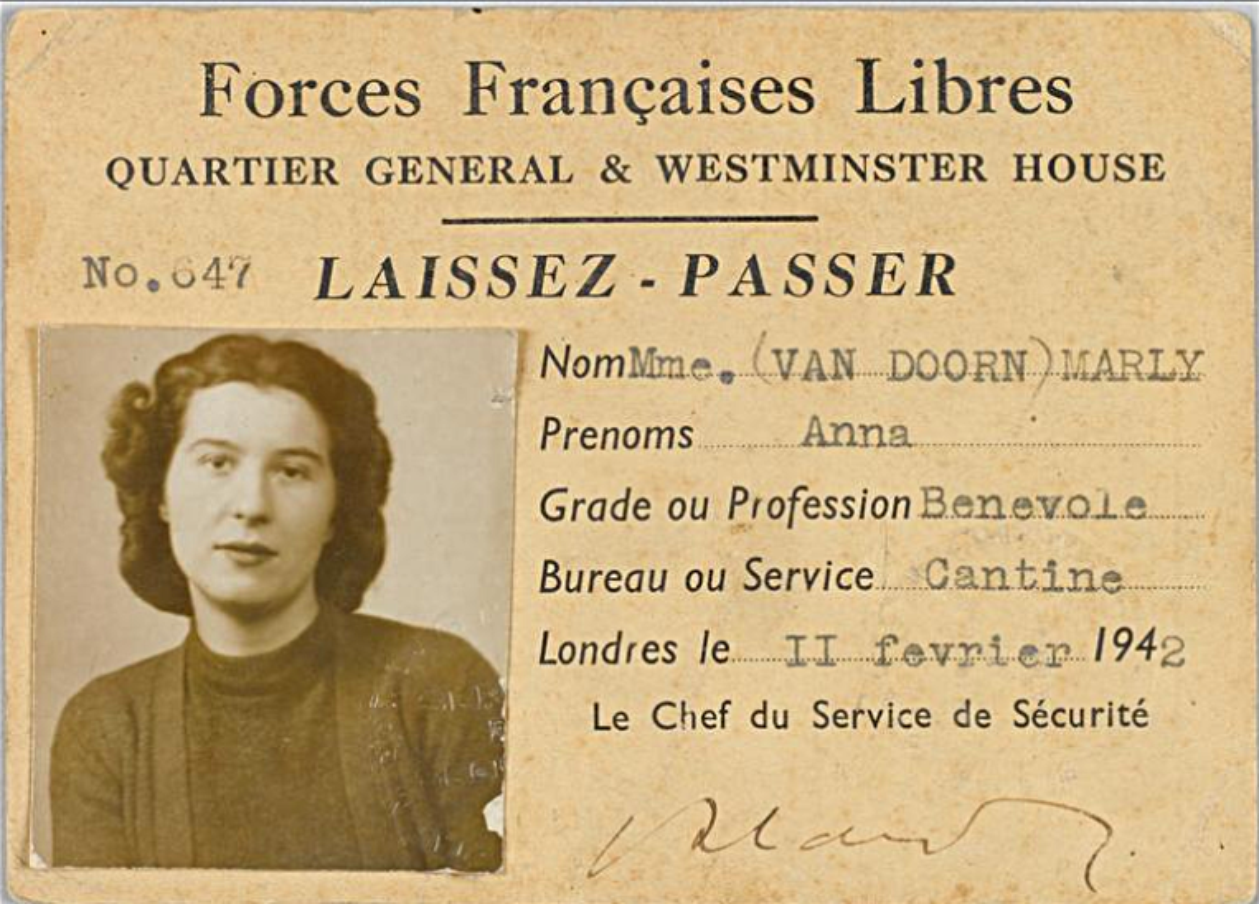
The Free French Forces pass of Anna Marly 1942

After the fall of France in 1940 Marly fled to London with her Dutch husband . It was while she was in London that she made contact with the Free French rebels. Emmanuel d'Astier de La Vigerie, a prominent figure in the resistance, heard Marly sing the Chant des Partisans in Russian when he visited London in 1943. He asked the writers Joseph Kessel and Maurice Druon, both of whom had travelled with him, to translate the song into French. D'Astier asked for the translation with the intention of using the song as a replacement for La Marseillaise, which had been banned by the Nazi Party. Following this translation, the song quickly established itself as the surrogate anthem of the supporters of the French resistance both in France and Britain. Kessel and Druon, however, took the credit for writing the song; it was not until some years later that she gained the recognition she deserved for writing the original song.

Towards the end of the war Marly joined the Entertainments National Service Association, performing her songs to the Allied forces across Europe.

== Later life ==
Marly divorced her husband after the war, shortly afterwards marrying a fellow Russian White émigré refugee. They originally travelled to South America and Africa before coming to the United States. They lived in Pennsylvania where her husband was a professor. Upon his retirement, they were drawn to Richfield Springs, New York, because of the Russian Orthodox Monastery, the only such monastery in North America. Her husband is buried there; shortly after his death she moved to Lazy Mountain, Alaska, where she lived until her death.

Anna Marly also wrote "A Song in Triple Time" ("Une chanson à trois temps") for Édith Piaf and "La Complainte du Partisan" (known in English as "The Partisan"). In the United States, "The Partisan" gained popularity when Leonard Cohen released it in 1969 and Joan Baez in 1972.

Many French singers have recorded "Chant des partisans", including Yves Montand in 1955. In recognition of the importance of "Chant des partisans", Marly was named a chevalier de La Légion d'Honneur by François Mitterrand in 1985, the fortieth anniversary of the liberation of France.

On June 17, 2000, she performed Le Chant des partisans at the Panthéon with the Choir of the French Army, on the eve of the 60th anniversary of General de Gaulle's Appeal of 18 June, regarded as one of the most important speeches in French history.

She died on 15 February 2006 and is buried in the Palmer cemetery.

== Sources ==
- Marly, Anna (2000). Mémoires. Paris, Tallandier. ISBN 2-235-02279-0.
