= Pioneer Peak (Alaska) =

Mountain in Alaska, US

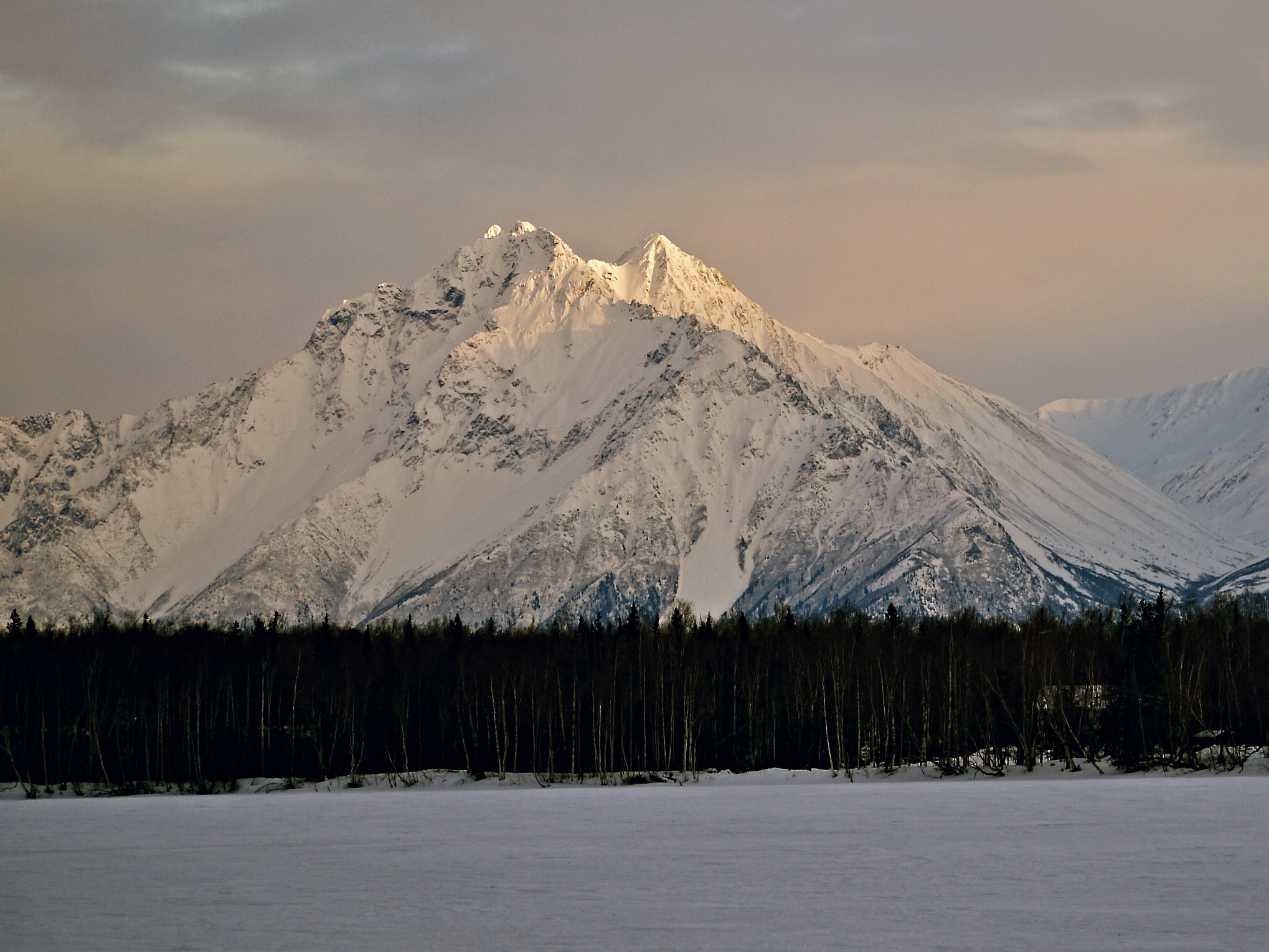
- Pioneer Peak, northwest aspect

Highest point
- Elevation: 6,398 ft (1,950 m)
- Prominence: 1,798 ft (548 m)
- Coordinates: 61°28′32″N 149°01′59″W

Naming
- Native name: Tnel'aay (Ahtena); Dnal'iy (Denaʼina)

Geography
- Location within Alaska
- Interactive map of Pioneer Peak
- Location: Matanuska-Susitna Borough; Alaska, U.S.
- Parent range: Chugach Mountains
- Topo map: USGS Anchorage D-6

Climbing
- First ascent: 1936

Pioneer Peak (Ahtna: Tnel'aay; Dena'ina: Dnal'iy) is a 6,398-foot (1,950 m) mountain in the Chugach Mountains in the U.S. state of Alaska. Located beside the Knik River just nine miles (14 km) south of Palmer and about six miles outside the Municipality of Anchorage limits, it is a prominent landmark in the Matanuska-Susitna Valley, as well as a popular hiking destination. Its Ahtna name means "the object is standing still" and its Dena'ina name means "the one that watches us". The name was given in 1939 in honor of the pioneers of the Matanuska agricultural colony of the mid-1930s. The Pioneer Ridge Trail leads up the eastern shoulder, beginning below 200', it allows access to the South summit. The North summit, and true summit of Pioneer Peak does not have a trail, and advanced mountaineering techniques are required. The first ascent of this peak was made June 1936 by Vernon Haik and John Wolffe via the Northwest Face.

== Climate ==
Based on the Köppen climate classification, Pioneer Peak is located in a subarctic climate zone with long, cold, snowy winters, and mild summers. Weather systems coming off the Gulf of Alaska are forced upwards by the Chugach Mountains (orographic lift), causing heavy precipitation in the form of rainfall and snowfall. Temperatures can drop below −20 °C with wind chill factors below −30 °C. The months May through June offer the most favorable weather for climbing or viewing.

== Gallery ==
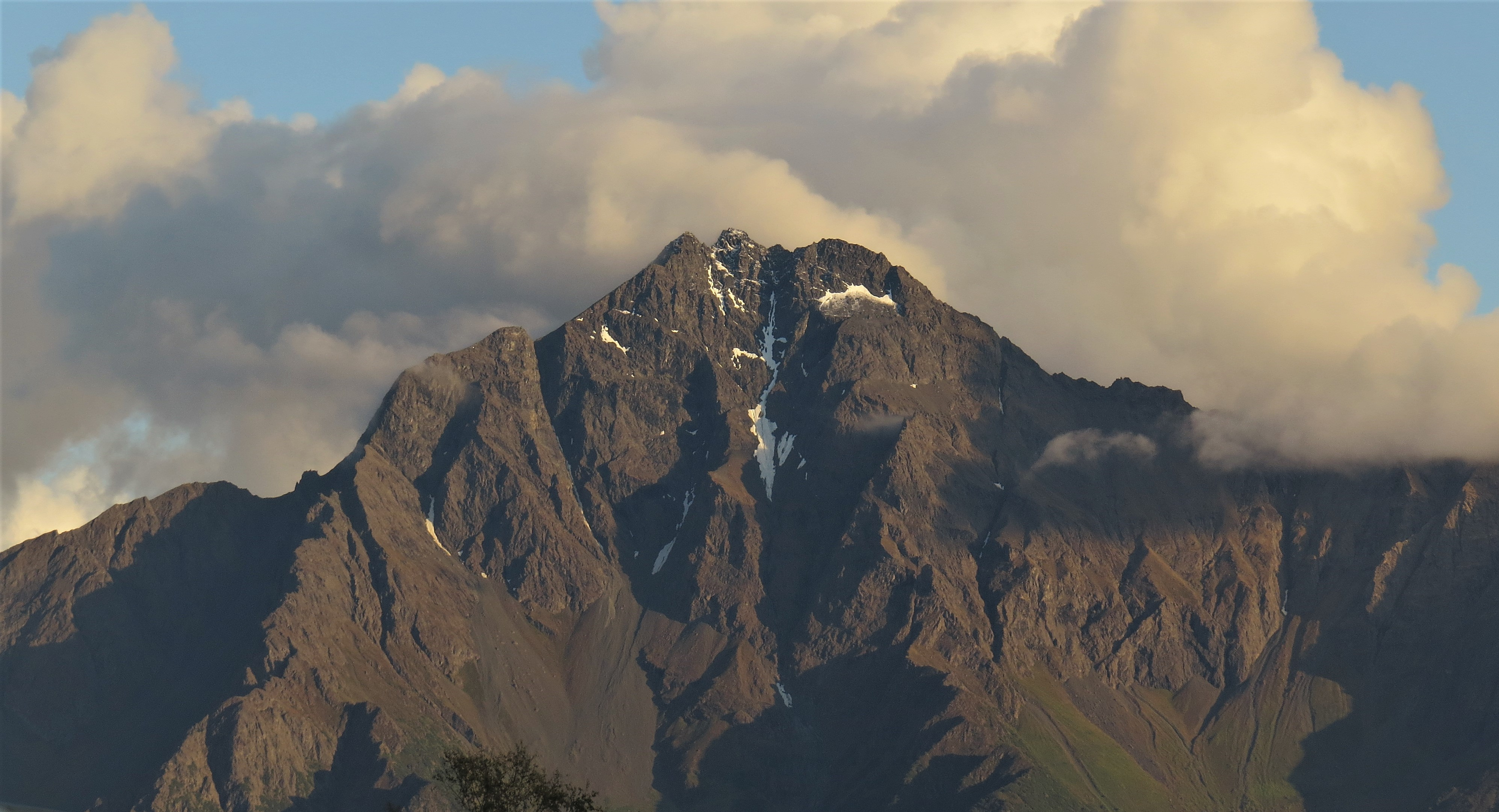

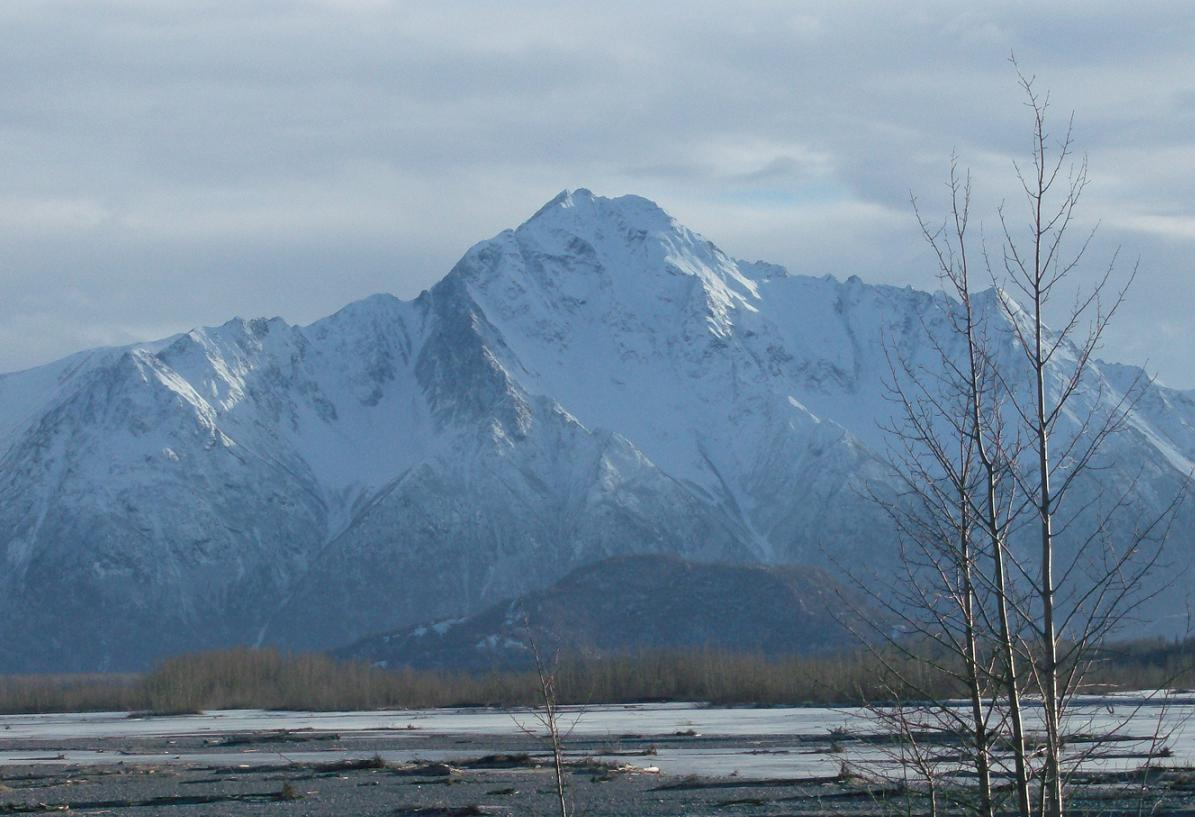
Looking south at Pioneer Peak, as seen from the east of Palmer, Alaska.

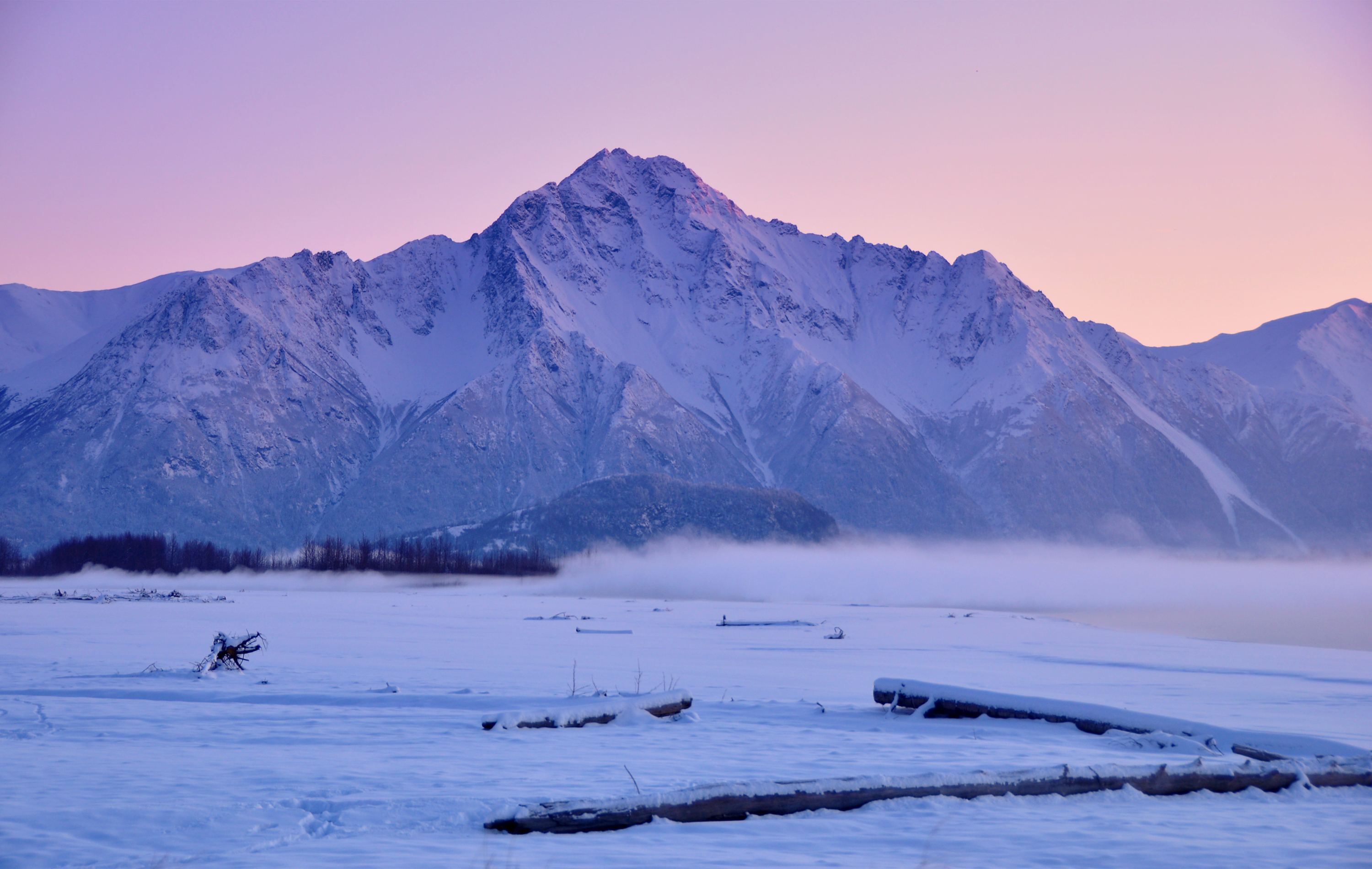
Twilight lights up Pioneer Peak before darkness ensues

== See also ==
- List of mountain peaks of Alaska
- Geography of Alaska
