= USS Eridanus =

Cargo ship of the United States Navy

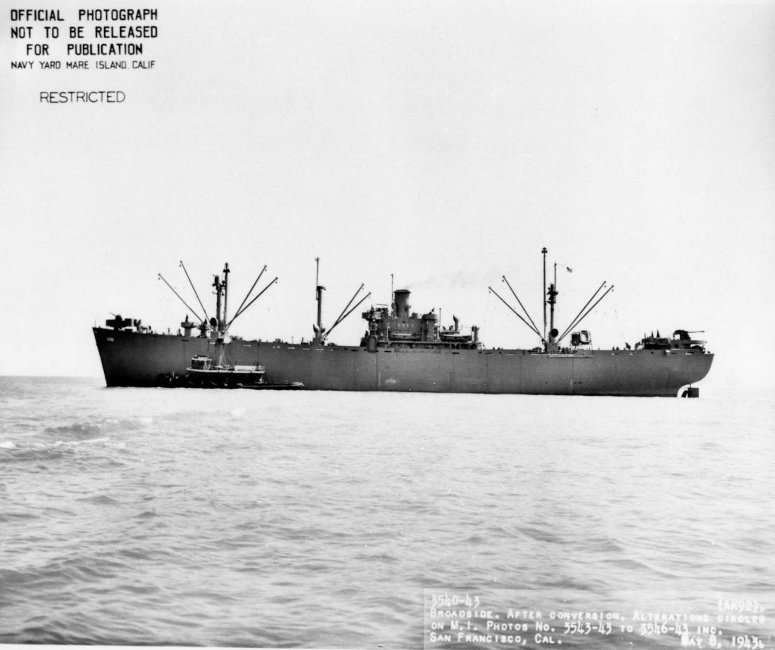
- USS Eridanus (AK-92), broadside view, in San Francisco Bay, 8 May 1943.

History

United States
- Name: Luther Burbank; Eridanus
- Namesake: Luther Burbank; The constellation Eridanus
- Ordered: as a Type EC2-S-C1 hull, MCE hull 1099
- Builder: Permanente Metals Corporation, Richmond, California
- Cost: $982,446
- Yard number: 1099
- Way number: 8
- Laid down: 12 March 1943
- Launched: 9 April 1943
- Sponsored by: Mrs. Luther Burbank
- Acquired: 22 April 1943
- Commissioned: 8 May 1943
- Decommissioned: 8 May 1946
- Stricken: 21 May 1946
- Identification: Hull symbol: AK-92; Code letters: NJTD
- Honors and awards: 1 × battle star
- Fate: Sold for commercial use, 14 February 1947

Greece
- Name: Panagiotis
- Namesake: Paul Kruger
- Owner: John P. G. Livanos, Athens, Greece
- Acquired: 17 February 1947
- Fate: Sold, 18 September 1956

South Korea
- Name: Silla
- Owner: Far Eastern Marine Transport Company, Ltd., Inchon, South Korea
- Acquired: 18 September 1956
- Fate: Scrapped September 1972

General characteristics
- Class & type: Crater-class cargo ship
- Tonnage: 10,860 long tons deadweight (DWT)
- Displacement: 4,023 long tons (4,088 t) (standard); 14,550 long tons (14,780 t) (full load)
- Length: 441 ft 6 in (134.57 m)
- Beam: 56 ft 11 in (17.35 m)
- Draft: 28 ft 4 in (8.64 m)
- Installed power: 2 × Oil fired 450 °F (232 °C) boilers, operating at 220 psi (1,500 kPa) , (manufactured by Babcock & Wilcox); 2,500 shp (1,900 kW)
- Propulsion: 1 × Vertical triple-expansion reciprocating steam engine, (manufactured by Joshua Hendy); 1 × screw propeller
- Speed: 12.5 kn (23.2 km/h; 14.4 mph)
- Capacity: 7,800 t (7,700 long tons) DWT; 444,206 cu ft (12,578.5 m^{3}) (non-refrigerated)
- Complement: 206
- Armament: 1 × 5 in (127 mm)/38 caliber dual-purpose (DP) gun; 1 × 3 in (76 mm)/50 caliber DP gun; 2 × 40 mm (1.57 in) Bofors anti-aircraft (AA) gun mounts; 6 × 20 mm (0.79 in) Oerlikon cannon AA gun mounts

General characteristics 1956
- Tonnage: 11,000 long tons deadweight (DWT)
- Length: 449 ft (137 m)

USS Eridanus (AK-92) was a Crater-class cargo ship commissioned by the US Navy for service in World War II and crewed by the US Coast Guard. She was named after the constellation Eridanus. She was responsible for delivering goods and equipment to locations in the war zone.

== Construction ==
Eridanus was launched 9 April 1943, as Luther Burbank, MCE hull 1099, by Permanente Metals Corporation, Yard No. 2, Richmond, California, under a Maritime Commission (MARCOM) contract; sponsored by Mrs. Luther Burbank; acquired by the Navy 22 April 1943; and commissioned 8 May 1943.

== Service history ==
Eridanus carried cargo and passengers between US West Coast ports and bases in the southwest Pacific, the Hawaiians, New Zealand, the Philippines, and the Palaus from 26 June 1943 to 3 February 1946, often making lengthy tows in addition to her cargo operations. Almost constantly at sea, she played her part in the Navy's gigantic task of carrying supplies for its ships and shore bases, as well as for the US Marines and US Army, halfway round the world at the same time as it carried on combat operations. In February 1944 she made a direct contribution to the troops seizing islands in the northern Solomons, bringing cargo and passengers to Bougainville.

Her last service was a long and difficult towing job, in which she took section of a floating dry dock from Eniwetok, sailing 4 February 1946, to Hampton Roads, Virginia, arriving 16 April.

== Decommissioning ==
She was decommissioned at Baltimore, Maryland, 8 May 1946, and returned to the War Shipping Administration (WSA), 15 May 1946, her name reverted to Luther Burbank. She was then laid up in the National Defense Reserve Fleet, James River Group, Lee Hall, Virginia, the same day.

== Merchant service ==
On 14 February 1947, she was sold for commercial service to John P. G. Livanos, Athens, Greece, for $544,546. She was re-flagged for Greece and renamed Panagiotis.

On 15 November 1955, she ran aground at Kunsan, Korea while carrying a load of coal from Baltimore, Maryland, to Inchon. She broke in two, 21 November 1955, and was declared a total loss. Far Eastern Marine Transport Co Ltd, Inchon, bought her 18 September 1956. Both parts were refloated, towed to Pusan, then to Shimonoseki, Japan. The aft section arrived 18 September 1956, with the name Silla. The forepart arrived three days later, 21 September 1956. Both parts were then towed to Tokyo where they were rejoined by I.H.I. and lengthened to 449 ft (137 m), which increased her to 11,000 long tons deadweight (DWT). She resumed service as Silla, flagged South Korean. She was laid up 31 January 1972, at Masan, South Korea. She was finally sold to local breakers, where she resumed trading for short period before being eventually being scrapped at Masan, September 1972.

== Awards ==
Eridanus received one battle star for World War II service. Her crew was eligible for the following medals:

- American Campaign Medal
- Asiatic-Pacific Campaign Medal (1)
- World War II Victory Medal (with Asia clasp)

== Bibliography ==
- "Eridanus". Dictionary of American Naval Fighting Ships. Naval History and Heritage Command. This article incorporates text from this source, which is in the public domain.
- "Kaiser Permanente No. 2, Richmond CA". ShipbuildingHistory.com. 13 October 2010.
- "USS Eridanus (AK-92)". NavSource. 13 June 2014.
- "LUTHER BURBANK (AK-92)". United States Department of Transportation. Archived from the original on 12 December 2019.
- "SS Luther Burbank".
