= Palmer Municipal Airport =

- IATA: PAQ; ICAO: PAAQ; FAA LID: PAQ; WMO: 70274

Summary
- Airport type: Public
- Owner: City of Palmer
- Location: Palmer, Alaska, US
- Elevation AMSL: 242 ft / 74 m
- Coordinates: 61°35′42″N 149°05′19″W

Map
- Location of airport in Alaska

Runways
| Direction | Length | | Surface |
| Direction | ft | m | Surface |
|---|---|---|---|
| 9/27 | 3,617 | 1,102 | Asphalt |
| 16/34 | 6,009 | 1,832 | Asphalt |
| 16S/34S | 1,560 | 475 | Gravel |

Statistics
- Based aircraft: 227
- Source: Federal Aviation Administration

Palmer Municipal Airport (IATA: PAQ, ICAO: PAAQ, FAA LID: PAQ) is a public airport located 1 mi (1.6 km) southeast of the central business district of Palmer, a city in Matanuska-Susitna Borough, Alaska, United States. This airport is owned by the City of Palmer.

== Facilities ==
Palmer Municipal Airport has three runways:

- Runway 9/27: 3,617 x 75 ft. (1,102 x 23 m), Surface: Asphalt
- Runway 16/34: 6,009 x 100 ft. (1,832 x 30 m), Surface: Asphalt
- Runway 16S/34S: 1,560 x 60 ft. (475 x 18 m), Surface: Gravel

There are 227 aircraft based at this airport: 88% single engine, 7% multi-engine, 3% helicopters and 2% gliders.

== See also ==
- List of airports in Alaska
