= Palmer, Alaska =

City in the United States

Palmer
- City
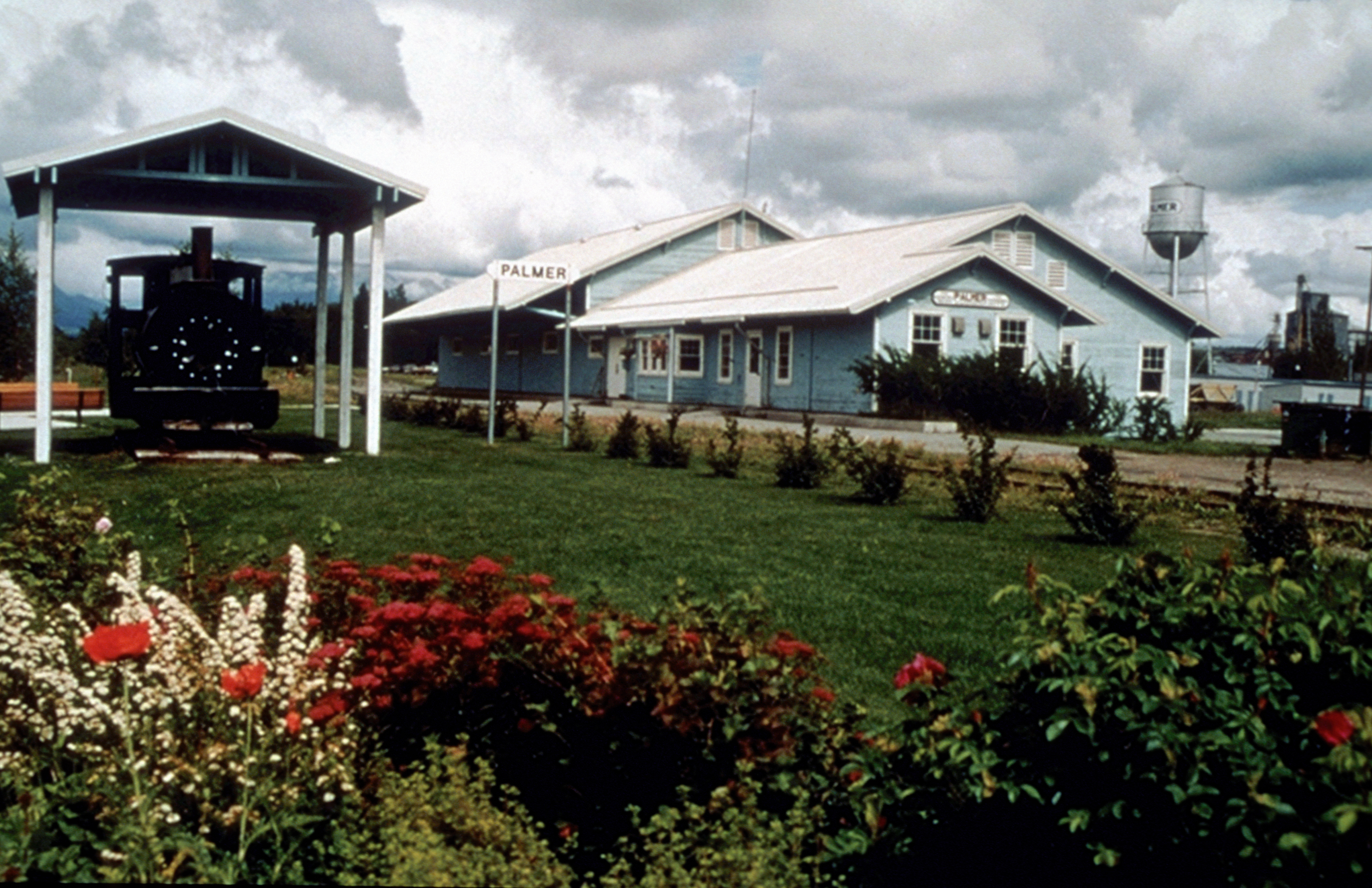
- Palmer depot with a narrow-gauge locomotive
- Motto: "Alaska at Its Best"
- Location in Matanuska-Susitna Borough and the state of Alaska

- Location in the state of Alaska Location in North America
- Coordinates: 61°36′07″N 149°07′02″W
- Country: United States
- State: Alaska
- Borough: Matanuska-Susitna
- Incorporated: April 30, 1951

Government
  - Mayor: Jim Cooper
  - State senator: Cathy Tilton (R)
  - State rep.: DeLena Johnson (R)

Area
  - Total: 5.07 sq mi (13.14 km^{2})
  - Land: 5.07 sq mi (13.14 km^{2})
  - Water: 0 sq mi (0.00 km^{2})
- Elevation: 233 ft (71 m)

Population (2020)
  - Total: 5,888
  - Density: 1,161.0/sq mi (448.25/km^{2})
- Time zone: UTC−9 (Alaska (AKST))
  - Summer (DST): UTC−8 (AKDT)
- ZIP code: 99645
- Area code: 907
- FIPS code: 02-58660
- GNIS feature ID: 1407737
- Website: Official website

Palmer is a city in and the borough seat of the Matanuska-Susitna Borough, Alaska, United States, located 42 miles (68 km) northeast of Anchorage on the Glenn Highway in the Matanuska Valley. It is the ninth-largest city in Alaska, and forms part of the Anchorage metropolitan statistical area. As of the 2020 census, the population of the city is 5,888, down from 5,937 in 2010.

Palmer hosts the annual Alaska State Fair, and is also the headquarters of the National Tsunami Warning Center.

== History ==
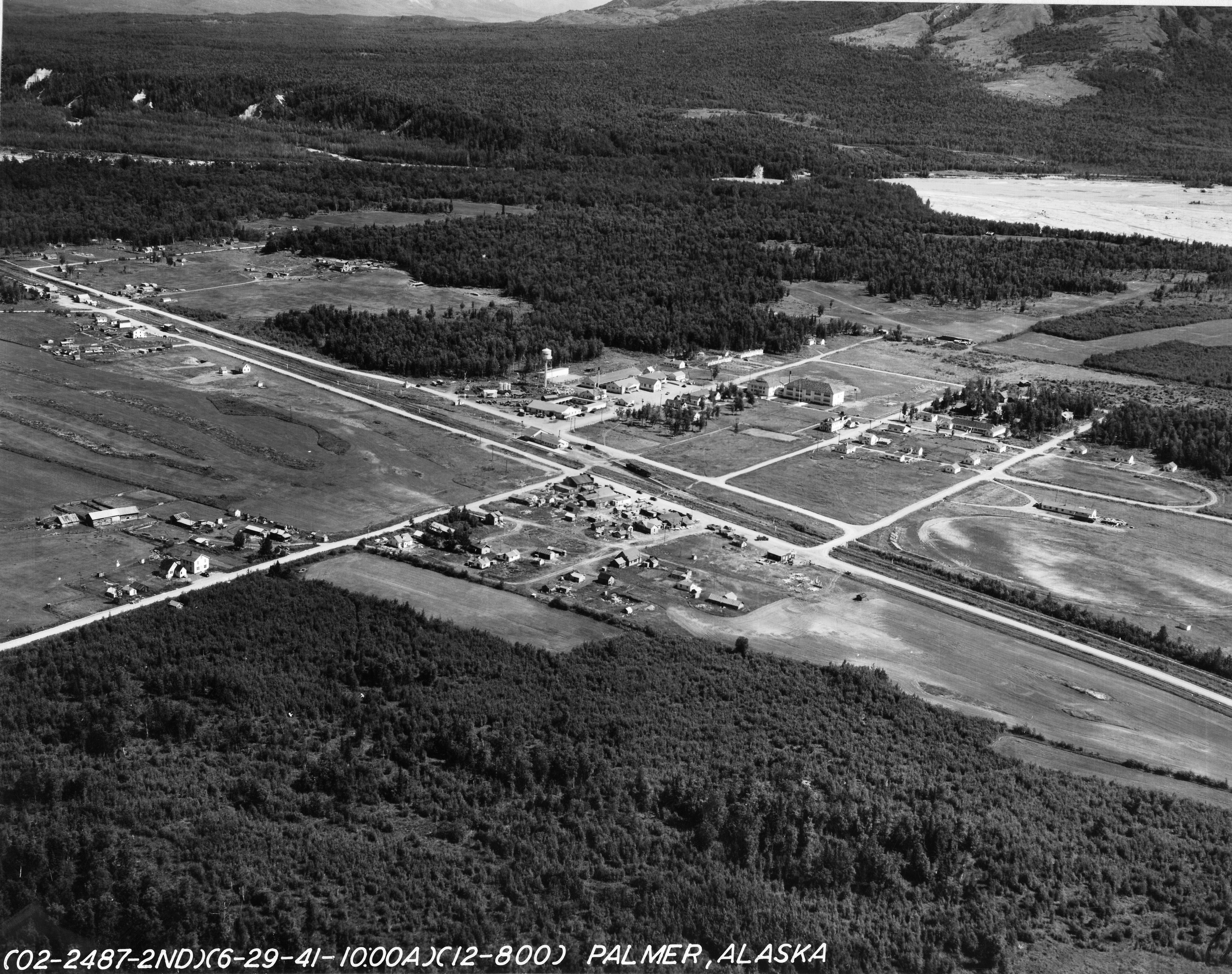
Palmer in the 1940s

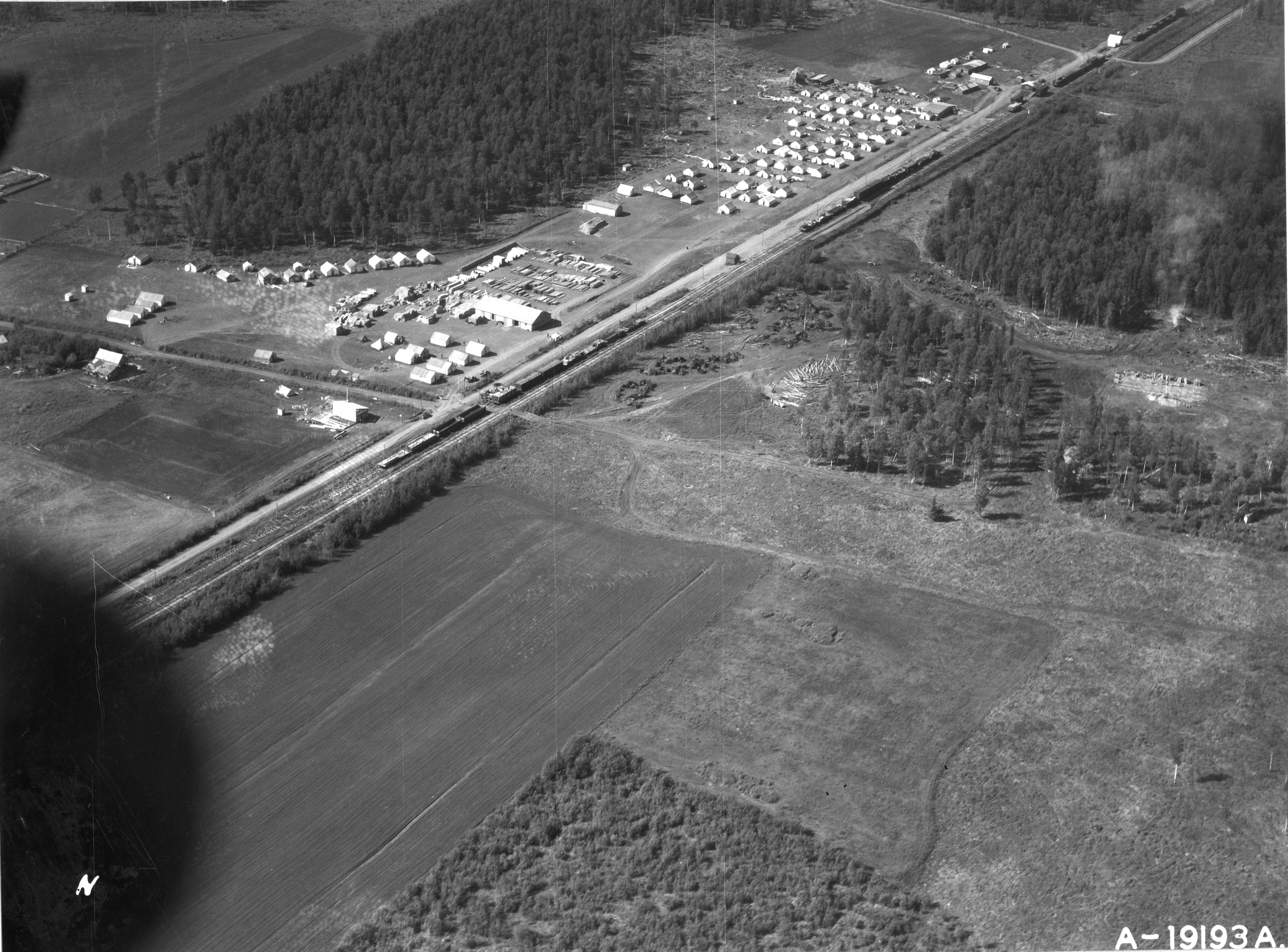
Palmer, 1940s

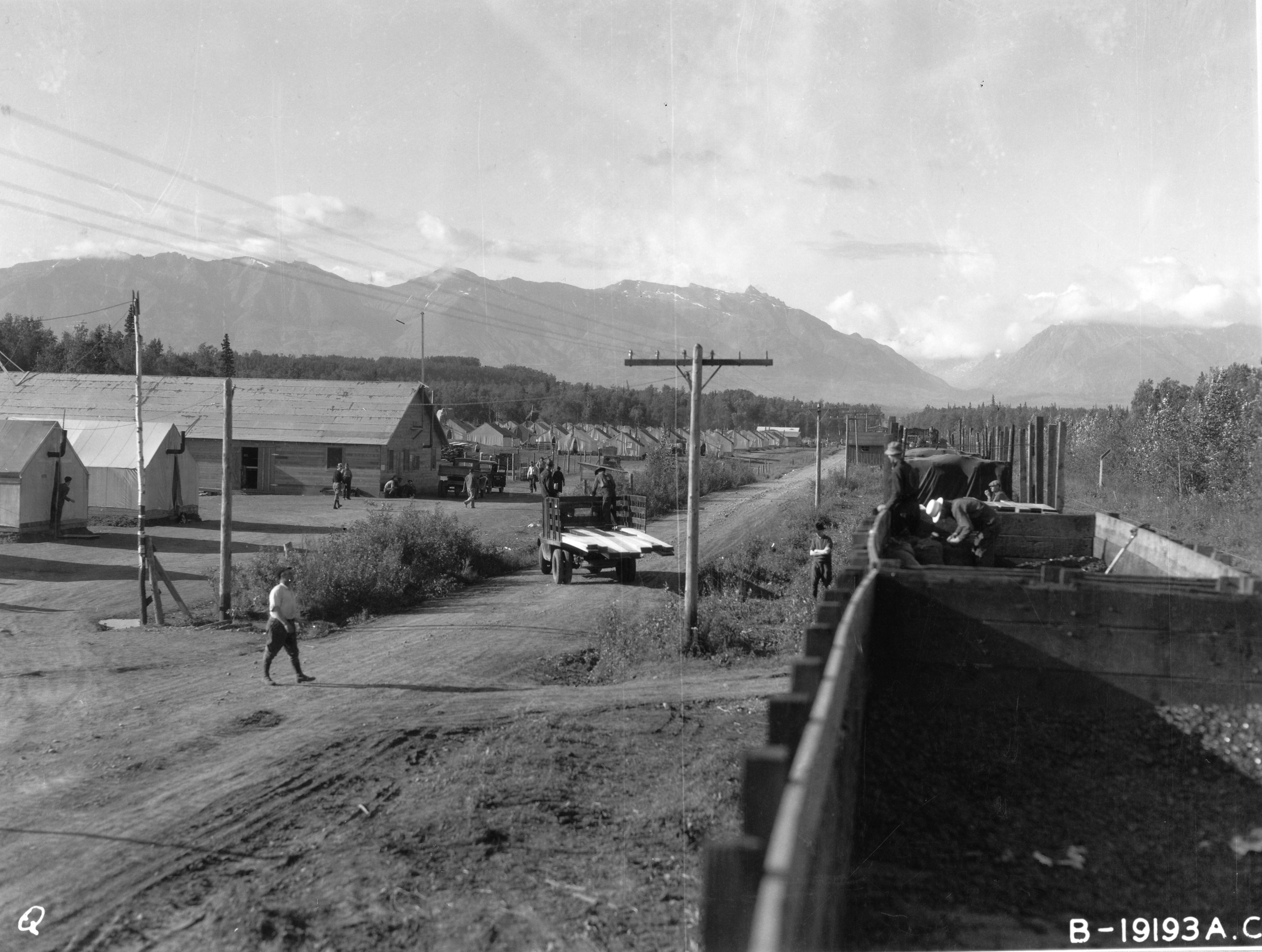
Palmer, 1940s

The city was named after George Palmer, a trader.

In the late 19th century, the U.S. government began to take interest in the Matanuska coal fields located north of Palmer. This interest sparked financiers to consider constructing the Alaska Central Railroad in 1904. The advent of World War I created a need for high-quality coal to fuel U.S. battleships, and by 1917 the US Navy had constructed rail from the port of Seward to the Chickaloon coal deposits. At the end of World War I, the U.S. Navy distributed land in the coal fields to war veterans and additional land was opened to homesteading. Farmers, miners and homesteaders began to populate the area. The Palmer Post Office was opened July 6, 1917, under the name of Warton. With railroad accessibility, new markets for agriculture began to open up for farmers in the Matanuska Valley.

In one year, Palmer transformed from a mere whistle stop rail siding to a planned community with modern utilities and community services. Eleven million dollars from Federal Emergency Relief Administration was spent to create the town of Palmer and relocate 203 families from the hard hit Iron Range region of Michigan, Minnesota and Wisconsin. Families traveled by train and ship to Palmer, arriving in May 1935. Upon their arrival they were housed in a city tent during their first Alaskan summer. Each family drew lots for 40-acre (160,000 m^{2}) tracts and their farming adventure began in earnest. The failure rate was high, but many of their descendants still live in the area and there are still many operating farms in the Palmer area, including the Vanderwheele and Wolverine farms. In 1971, the National Outdoor Leadership School started operating wilderness education courses in the nearby Talkeetna and Chugach mountain ranges from a local historic farmhouse, the Berry House, which is currently listed on the National Register of Historic Places.

In addition to an agrarian heritage, the colony families brought with them Midwest America's small-town values, institutional structures, and a well-planned city center reminiscent of their old hometowns in Minnesota, Wisconsin, and Michigan. Many of the structures built are now in a nationally recognized historic district. Construction of the statewide road system and the rapid development of Anchorage has fueled growth around Palmer. Many Palmer residents commute 45 minutes to work in Anchorage.

== Geography ==
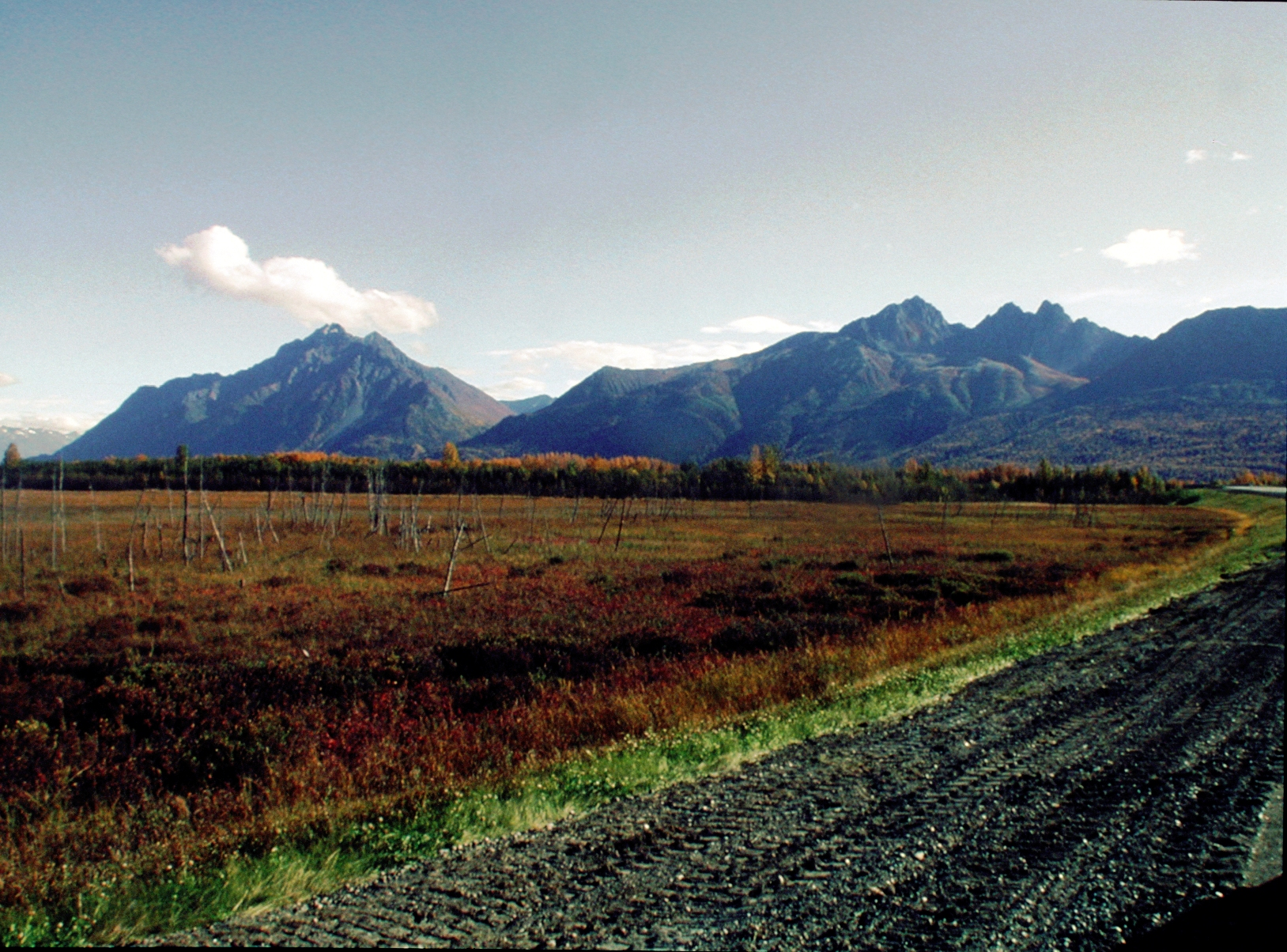
The view traveling toward Anchorage from Palmer. Pioneer Peak is to the left with Twin Peaks to the right of Pioneer. The "Ghost Forest" of the Palmer Hay Flats State Game Refuge is shown in the foreground. These trees died from the subsidence that occurred in the area as a result of the Great Alaska earthquake of 1964.

Palmer is 42 miles (68 km) northeast of Anchorage on the Glenn Highway. It lies on the north shore of the Matanuska River, not far above tidewater, in a wide valley between the Talkeetna Mountains to the north and the Chugach Mountains to the south and east. Pioneer Peak rises over 6,000 feet (1,800 m) above the town, just a few miles south. East of Palmer is Lazy Mountain, and standing behind that is Matanuska Peak. Lazy Mountain, Matanuska Peak, and Pioneer Peak are all a part of the Chugach Range. North of Palmer are the Talkeetna Mountains. Hatcher Pass, a local favorite for hiking, skiing and other recreational activities, is located in this mountain range about 22 mi (35 km) from Palmer.

According to the United States Census Bureau, the city has a total area of 3.8 square miles (9.8 km^{2}), all of it land. Palmer and Wasilla are the two major old-town cores of the Matanuska-Susitna Valley. Population of the area has grown dramatically in the past decade; Borough officials estimate the local population at 8,000.

Apart from road access, Palmer can be accessed by the Palmer Municipal Airport and the Palmer Depot of the Alaska Railroad. Neither of these has regularly scheduled service. However, when the Alaska State Fair operates, the Alaska Railroad operates a special train from Anchorage to Palmer (though it did not operate in 2021).

=== Climate ===
Palmer has a subarctic climate (Köppen climate classification: Dsc). Despite this classification, the city receives noticeably more precipitation in summer, with August being the wettest month. However, April, one of the six warmer months is sufficiently drier than October and December, hence the letter 's' is used instead of 'f' (as in Dfc).

Palmer has a climate similar to that of Anchorage, although with low temperatures that are on average 1.4 °F (0.8 °C) cooler and highs 0.8 °F (0.4 °C) warmer. On average, over the course of a year, there are 28–29 days of sub-0 °F (−18 °C) lows, 22–23 days of 70 °F (21 °C)+ highs, and 0.8 days of 80 °F (27 °C)+ highs. The town straddles the border between USDA Plant Hardiness Zones 4b and 5a, indicating the coldest temperature of the year is typically around −20 °F (−29 °C). Palmer is flanked by two glaciers, the Matanuska Glacier and the Knik Glacier. Wind blows through the Matanuska and Knik River Valleys into the town frequently. If there is a substantial snowfall, it will often sit for several days before most of it is blown away. These warm winds from the Knik valley can raise winter temperatures for a couple days at a time, while winter winds from the Matanuska valley usually remain below freezing. The warming winds from the Knik valley are often called Chinook winds by the local people.

Climate data for Palmer Municipal Airport, Alaska, 1991–2020 normals, extremes 1997–present
Month	Jan	Feb	Mar	Apr	May	Jun	Jul	Aug	Sep	Oct	Nov	Dec	Year
Record high °F (°C)	58 (14)	62 (17)	59 (15)	73 (23)	80 (27)	86 (30)	88 (31)	85 (29)	70 (21)	67 (19)	55 (13)	52 (11)	88 (31)
Mean maximum °F (°C)	45.8 (7.7)	46.5 (8.1)	46.0 (7.8)	58.9 (14.9)	72.9 (22.7)	76.7 (24.8)	78.5 (25.8)	74.5 (23.6)	65.8 (18.8)	57.1 (13.9)	44.6 (7.0)	44.7 (7.1)	80.1 (26.7)
Mean daily maximum °F (°C)	22.4 (−5.3)	28.3 (−2.1)	34.9 (1.6)	47.8 (8.8)	59.1 (15.1)	65.7 (18.7)	67.6 (19.8)	64.6 (18.1)	55.8 (13.2)	42.3 (5.7)	28.9 (−1.7)	25.1 (−3.8)	45.1 (7.3)
Daily mean °F (°C)	15.4 (−9.2)	20.8 (−6.2)	25.5 (−3.6)	38.8 (3.8)	49.0 (9.4)	56.3 (13.5)	59.2 (15.1)	56.4 (13.6)	48.3 (9.1)	35.4 (1.9)	22.2 (−5.4)	18.3 (−7.6)	37.1 (2.8)
Mean daily minimum °F (°C)	8.3 (−13.2)	13.2 (−10.4)	17.2 (−8.2)	29.8 (−1.2)	38.8 (3.8)	46.9 (8.3)	50.7 (10.4)	48.2 (9.0)	40.8 (4.9)	28.6 (−1.9)	15.6 (−9.1)	11.4 (−11.4)	29.1 (−1.6)
Mean minimum °F (°C)	−14.1 (−25.6)	−8.0 (−22.2)	−2.3 (−19.1)	16.3 (−8.7)	30.6 (−0.8)	39.5 (4.2)	45.1 (7.3)	40.0 (4.4)	28.9 (−1.7)	14.0 (−10.0)	−3.5 (−19.7)	−8.2 (−22.3)	−17.4 (−27.4)
Record low °F (°C)	−27 (−33)	−39 (−39)	−12 (−24)	−8 (−22)	22 (−6)	35 (2)	42 (6)	32 (0)	21 (−6)	−3 (−19)	−19 (−28)	−25 (−32)	−39 (−39)
Average precipitation inches (mm)	0.65 (17)	0.70 (18)	0.47 (12)	0.30 (7.6)	0.62 (16)	1.00 (25)	1.60 (41)	2.32 (59)	2.08 (53)	1.25 (32)	0.66 (17)	0.96 (24)	12.61 (321.6)
Average precipitation days (≥ 0.01 in)	6.2	6.1	4.6	3.9	6.7	8.7	11.9	14.3	13.3	8.9	5.6	7.7	97.9
Source 1: NWS (mean maxima and minima 2006–2020)
Source 2: NOAA

== Demographics ==
Historical population
Census	Pop.	Note	%±
1940	150		—
1950	890		493.3%
1960	1,181		32.7%
1970	1,140		−3.5%
1980	2,141		87.8%
1990	2,866		33.9%
2000	4,533		58.2%
2010	5,937		31.0%
2020	5,888		−0.8%
U.S. Decennial Census

=== 2020 census ===
As of the 2020 census, Palmer had a population of 5,888. The median age was 34.0 years. 25.6% of residents were under the age of 18 and 14.7% of residents were 65 years of age or older. For every 100 females there were 98.0 males, and for every 100 females age 18 and over there were 92.7 males age 18 and over.

99.6% of residents lived in urban areas, while 0.4% lived in rural areas.

There were 2,168 households in Palmer, of which 34.2% had children under the age of 18 living in them. Of all households, 42.0% were married-couple households, 19.4% were households with a male householder and no spouse or partner present, and 31.4% were households with a female householder and no spouse or partner present. About 30.7% of all households were made up of individuals and 13.5% had someone living alone who was 65 years of age or older.

There were 2,408 housing units, of which 10.0% were vacant. The homeowner vacancy rate was 1.5% and the rental vacancy rate was 10.1%.

Racial composition as of the 2020 census
Race	Number	Percent
White	4,239	72.0%
Black or African American	96	1.6%
American Indian and Alaska Native	554	9.4%
Asian	103	1.7%
Native Hawaiian and Other Pacific Islander	46	0.8%
Some other race	118	2.0%
Two or more races	732	12.4%
Hispanic or Latino (of any race)	364	6.2%

=== 2010 census ===
As of the 2010 United States census, there were 5,937 people, 1,472 households, and 1,058 families residing in the city. The population density was 1,206.3 inhabitants per square mile (465.8/km^{2}). There were 1,555 housing units at an average density of 413.8 per square mile (159.8/km^{2}). The racial makeup of the city was 80.9% White, 2.1% Black or African American, 8.2% Native American, 1.1% Asian, 0.3% Pacific Islander, 1.2% from other races, and 6.3% from two or more races. 3.5% of the population were Hispanic or Latino of any race.

There were 1,472 households, out of which 47.4% had children under the age of 18 living with them, 50.3% were married couples living together, 16.6% had a female householder with no husband present, and 28.1% were non-families. 23.0% of all households were made up of individuals, and 7.5% had someone living alone who was 65 years of age or older. The average household size was 2.81 and the average family size was 3.29.

In the city, the age distribution of the population shows 33.6% under the age of 18, 11.8% from 18 to 24, 28.7% from 25 to 44, 16.8% from 45 to 64, and 9.1% who were 65 years of age or older. The median age was 29 years. For every 100 females, there were 98.1 males. For every 100 females age 18 and over, there were 93.6 males.

The median income for a household in the city was $45,571, and the median income for a family was $53,164. Males had a median income of $44,716 versus $25,221 for females. The per capita income for the city was $17,203. About 6.0% of families and 12.7% of the population were below the poverty line, including 12.6% of those under age 18 and 4.2% of those age 65 or over.

=== 2000 census ===
According to the 2000 United States census, 14.9% were of German, 10.5% United States or American, 8.9% Irish and 8.7% English ancestry.

== Arts and culture ==
=== Alaska State Fair ===
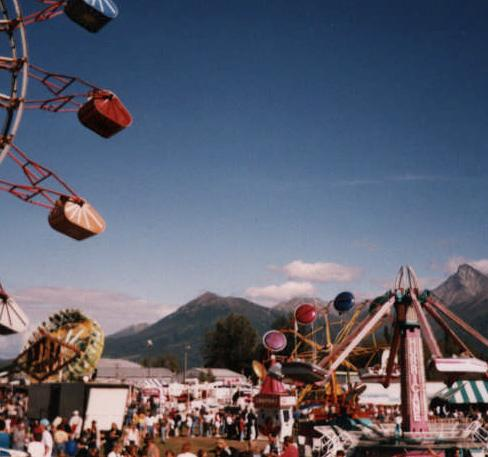
The carnival midway of the Alaska State Fair

Palmer is most noted in Alaska as the location of the annual Alaska State Fair, where Palmer's agricultural spirit lives on. The Alaska State Fair holds contests for largest vegetable in several categories, and many national and even world records have been recorded at the fair, with the cabbage, radish, spinach and lettuce categories usually dominating local interest. There are rides and festivities, local artists on display, local venders and food trucks, and popular musical artists at the ConcoPhilips Borealis Theatre. In 2008, Scott Robb of Palmer won 1st place and a $2,000 prize for his 79.1 lb (35.9 kg) cabbage.

=== Palmer Museum of History and Art ===
Palmer hosts a log cabin Visitor Information Center in the heart of downtown that entertains more than 35,000 visitors each year. Each summer, the visitor center employs a full-time gardener to maintain the 2 acres (8,100 m^{2}) of public gardens that showcase more than 600 locally grown plant varieties. The Palmer Museum of History and Art is located in the Visitor Information Center and offers visitors a chance to view artifacts from Palmer's history, provides maps to historical places to see and stocks guidebooks for more information on local attractions.

=== The Church of a Thousand Trees ===
A couple of blocks away from the Visitor Information Center is the United Protestant Church (aka The Church of a Thousand Trees), a Presbyterian church. It was built in 1936–37 and is one of the 17 structures that contribute to the National Register's Matanuska Colony Historic District.

=== Friday Fling ===
The Friday Fling is a local downtown event that takes place around the public library and train depot. Many small local businesses and farmers gather to sell goods.

== Parks and protected areas ==
Twelve miles north of Palmer is Hatcher Pass, a scenic mountainous pass. It has been established as a state park and is the home of the Independence Mine. It serves as a local back-country area for skiers, snowboarders, snowmachiners, and hikers as well as a tourist attraction in the summer months.

The area is also home to the Matanuska Lakes State Recreation Area (formerly known as the Kepler-Bradley Lakes State Recreation Area), which grants access to numerous small lakes, the Finger Lake State Recreation Area, and a number of city parks.

== Sports ==
The Mat-Su Miners, a franchise in the Alaska Baseball League, a high-level summer collegiate baseball league, play their games at Hermon Brothers Field on the State Fairgrounds. Colony High School bands play pep rally music, and different venders get together to bring a large crowd to support. With Division I collegiate players from all over the United States, the Miners have twice captured the coveted National Baseball Congress championship, in 1987 and 1997. Alaska Raceway Park is a nearby dragstrip. The Valley Steelers, a semi-pro football team within the Alaska Football League, play their home games at Palmer High School.

== Education ==
Primary and secondary education in Palmer is a part of the Matanuska-Susitna Borough School District. Within city limits, there are two elementary schools (Swanson Elementary and Sherrod Elementary), one middle school (Palmer Jr. Middle School) and one high school (Palmer High School).

Palmer High is of modest size, with 649 students and 73 staff members. In 1999, It became the first school in Alaska to offer the International Baccalaureate program. About six minutes from Palmer High is cross-town rival Colony High School.

Palmer is also home to Alaska Bible College, the state's only accredited school of theology and ministry, and Matanuska-Susitna College, an extended college of the University of Alaska Anchorage.

The Palmer Alaska Job Corps is at 800 E. Lynn Martin Drive, across from the Hageland airfield.

The Ya Ne Dah Ah School (YNDA School), operated by the Athabascan Nation Chickaloon Village, uses Alaska Native methods to teach children. It was established in 1992. It is funded with grant money. In 2012 the school did not receive an annual grant which would allow it to fund Athna language and cultural programs, and it failed to receive Bureau of Indian Affairs (BIA) funds since the BIA had a 1995 rule preventing it from funding Alaska Native programs.

== Notable people ==
- Charlie Akers (1939–2016), Olympic biathlete
- Corey Cogdell (born 1986), two-time Olympic bronze medalist in trap shooting (2008, 2016))
- Edna DeVries (born 1941), Borough Mayor of Matanuska-Susitna Borough.
- Anna Marly (1917–2006), Russian-French singer-songwriter; settled in Lazy Mountain where she became a citizen of the US; died in Palmer
- Ed Walker (1917–2011), last surviving member of Castner's Cutthroats, resided at Alaska Veterans and Pioneers Home in Palmer
- Talis J. Colberg (born 1958), former Attorney General of Alaska
- Ada Blackjack (1898-1983) an Iñupiaq explorer who was the sole survivor of an expedition to Wrangel Island in 1921-23.

== Sister cities ==
- Saroma, Hokkaido, Japan

On October 28, 1980, Palmer and Saroma agreed to a bilateral sister relation to promote cultural exchange and support a home-stay program for their residents. The relationship began with a friendship formed between Mr. Mutsuhiro Ishiguro, an English teacher at Saroma High School, and Palmer resident Edward Holmes. They met over their ham radios, and over time formed a friendship. Mr. Holmes eventually visited Saroma, which then led to a delegation from Saroma to Palmer, where they signed the sister city accords. Since that time, additional relationships have formed under the auspices of the town connection.

- Palmer High School with Saroma High School, established 1991
- Palmer Junior Middle School and Colony Middle School with Saroma Junior High School (佐呂間中学校), established 2003
- Pioneer Peak Elementary School with Saroma Elementary School (佐呂間小学校), established 1991
- Palmer Presbyterian Church with Saroma Christian Church

The sister city relationship is managed by the Palmer Saroma Kai (パーマ・サロマ会).

== See also ==
- Matanuska Valley Colony

== Sources ==
- Matanuska Valley Memoir: The Story of How One Alaskan Community Developed, by Hugh A. Johnson and Keith L. Stanton. Bulletin 18, 3rd edition, 1980. Originally published July 1955. Alaska Agricultural Experiment Station: Palmer, Alaska.
