= Martin Field Airport (Alaska) =

Martin Field
- IATA: none; ICAO: none; FAA LID: AK92

Summary
- Airport type: Private
- Owner: Martin, Kenneth
- Location: Lazy Mountain, Alaska
- Elevation AMSL: 820 ft (250 m)
- Coordinates: 61°38′17″N 149°01′44″W
- Interactive map of Martin Field

Runways
Direction	Length		Surface
Direction	ft	m	Surface
17/35	600	183	Dirt

Martin Field (FAA LID: AK92) is a private airport located 4 miles northeast of the central business district (CBD) of Palmer, Alaska, USA.

== Airport Overview ==
- FAA Identifier: AK92
- Location: Lazy Mountain, Alaska
- Coordinates: 61°38′14.74″N, 149°01′43.16″W
- Elevation: Approximately 783 feet (239 meters)
- Runway: One dirt runway designated 18/36, measuring 600 feet in length and 50 feet in width
- Obstructions: 30-foot trees located 300 feet from both runway ends
- Communication: Common Traffic Advisory Frequency (CTAF) 123.6 MHz
- Weather Information: Automated Surface Observing System (ASOS) available at nearby Palmer Municipal Airport (PAQ) on frequency 134.75 MHz
