= Birdsall (name) =

Birdsall is a surname that derives from Birdsall in North Yorkshire, England. It may refer to:

- Alice M. Birdsall (1880–1958), attorney, an expert in bankruptcy law, and a female rights advocate
- Ausburn Birdsall (1814–1903), U.S. Representative from New York
- Ben Birdsall (born 1967), English writer and artist
- Benjamin P. Birdsall (1858–1917), American politician
- Byron Birdsall (1937–2016), American painter
- Dave Birdsall (1838–1896), American baseball player
- Derek Birdsall (1934–2024), British graphic designer
- Doris Birdsall (died 2008), British politician
- Doug Birdsall, president of American Bible Society
- Emma Birdsall (born 1992), Australian singer-songwriter
- Horatio L. Birdsall (1833–1891), American soldier
- James Birdsall (1783–1856), U.S. Representative from New York
- Jeanne Birdsall (born 1951) American author of children's literature
- Jesse Birdsall (born 1963), English actor
- John Birdsall (1802–1839), New York and Texas lawyer and politician
- John Birdsall (1840–1891), New York politician
- Mary Birdsall (1828–1894), America journalist and suffragist
- Nancy Birdsall (born 1946), founding president of the Center for Global Development
- Pam Birdsall, Canadian politician
- Paul M. Birdsall (died 1970), American historian and diplomat
- Richard Birdsall (1799–1852), Canadian surveyor
- Samuel Birdsall (1791–1872), U.S. Representative from New York
- Steve Birdsall (born 1944), Australian aviation writer
- Timothy Birdsall (1936–1963), English cartoonist
- Tracey Birdsall (born 1963), American actress
- William Birdsall (1854–1909), American Quaker educator

Birdsall as a given or middle name may refer to:

- Birdsall Briscoe (1876–1971), American architect
- Birdsall S. Viault (1932–2012), American historian
- Richard Birdsall Rogers (1857–1927), Canadian engineer
- Sarah Birdsall Otis Edey (1872–1940), American suffragist
- Thomas B. Jackson (1797–1881), American politician

== See also ==
- Birdsell
