= Pattie Gonia =

American drag queen and activist (born 1992)

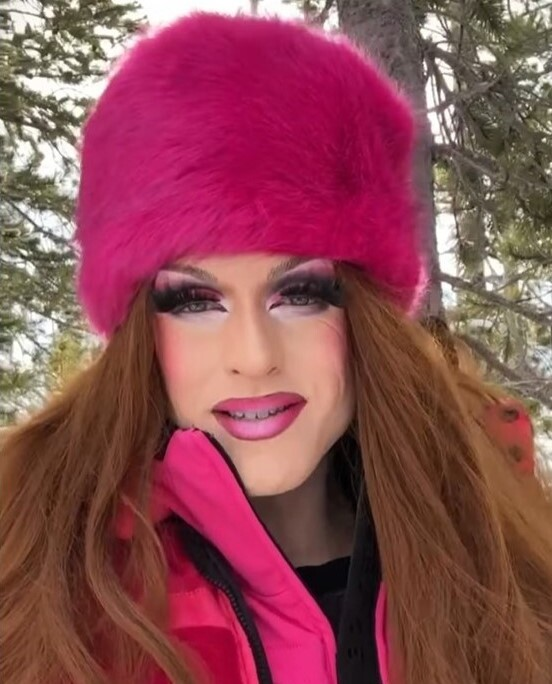
- Pattie Gonia in an advertisement for Ikon Pass in 2023
- Born: Wyn Wiley; July 21, 1992 (age 34); Lincoln, Nebraska, U.S.
- Occupations: Environmental activist; Drag queen; Social media personality
- Known for: Drag queen, environmental and LGBTQIA+ activist

Wyn Wiley (born July 21, 1992), known professionally as Pattie Gonia, is an American drag queen, environmental and LGBTQ+ activist, and community organizer.

== Early life and education ==
Wiley is from Lincoln, Nebraska.

Wiley graduated from the University of Nebraska–Lincoln with a degree in advertising and public relations in 2014. He (Note: Wiley uses he/him pronouns out of drag and she/her and they/them pronouns as Pattie Gonia. This article uses they/them for consistency.) worked as a creative director and professional photographer.

== Activism and career ==
Wiley's first experiment with drag was in early 2018, as the character "Ginger Snap". In October 2018, Wiley created the character Pattie Gonia, producing short-form outdoors activism content on Instagram and TikTok, while in drag. The first video as Pattie Gonia, posted on October 3, gained more than 100 million views. Pattie Gonia has said that the drag name was inspired by the Patagonia region of South America. The pun is often described as a reference to the outdoor apparel brand Patagonia, Inc.

Pattie Gonia's activism focuses on environmental and LGBTQ+ issues, promoting acceptance of queer identities in the environmentalist and outdoors communities, and promoting awareness of climate change and its effects. Euronews described this form of activism as "intersectional environmentalism".

In addition to online content, Pattie Gonia organizes in-person hikes and events for LGBTQ and environmental causes. They also developed a job board for queer folks seeking jobs and for companies to share job postings.

In January 2022, Wiley co-founded "The Outdoorist Oath", a nonprofit working on diversity, equity, and inclusion and environmental causes in the outdoors community. Pattie Gonia partnered with The North Face for their 2022 "Summer of Pride" series. The series comprised four outdoor community-building events focused on local LGBTQ+ engagement and acceptance.

Pattie Gonia is a firm supporter of Palestinian nationalism and has spoken up against the Israeli government throughout the Gaza genocide. They attended the 2024 GLAAD Awards holding a sign reading "End Genocide End Ecocide" as a reference to the war in Gaza and worldwide ecocide.

In 2024, Pattie Gonia hosted an environmental drag show titled "Anti-Plastic Fantastic", advocating against single-use plastics and the waste of not reusing clothing. In 2025, they gave a TedTalk about the role of joy in the fight against climate change and supporting queer rights.

=== Awards and recognition ===
In 2020, Pattie Gonia was recognized in the Out100, Out magazine's annual list of the "most impactful and influential LGBTQ+ people." They were also nominated for the Shorty Awards in the LGBTQ+ category. In 2023, Time magazine included Pattie Gonia in their list of Next Generation Leaders. In 2024, Pattie Gonia was named a National Geographic Traveler of the Year.

=== Media coverage ===
In December 2018, Wiley was interviewed by REI, an outdoor clothing company, alongside the release of their first music video as Pattie Gonia. In November 2019, they were the subject of a REI documentary titled "Dear Mother Nature". It was accompanied by a shorter, 3-minute spoken word poem video titled "Everything to Lose". Pattie Gonia later produced a video with BBC News about the activist's work in March 2020.

Pattie Gonia attracted media attention for attending the January 2019 Outdoor Retailer's trade show in all-white drag.

In October 2022, Pattie Gonia was the subject of media coverage for their Halloween costume, where they dressed as climate change. They have previously designed other outfits in support of climate causes and awareness, such as a dress and wigs made of recycled trash, for their TikTok and Instagram content.

In 2023, Pattie Gonia released "Won't Give Up" with cellist Yo-Yo Ma, and Indigenous trans musician Quinn Christopherson. The music video was filmed in Kenai Fjords National Park as a tribute to Exit Glacier, a melting glacier in Alaska which was once a hundred feet tall.

In 2024, an image of Pattie Gonia standing with Kamala Harris at a pride event in 2022 was used in an advertisement for the Donald Trump 2024 presidential campaign. The commercial used transgender people to attack Harris, stating that "Kamala is for they/them, President Trump is for you." The ad criticized Harris's statements that all people should be allowed gender-affirming healthcare, including inmates. Pattie Gonia responded to the ad on social media, by noting that the Trump campaign did not have permission to use the image and directing followers to a fundraiser for two LGBTQ advocacy groups.

Also in 2024, Pattie toured with their show SAVE HER!, an environmental drag show. The show visited a number of cities across the U.S.

== Patagonia trademark lawsuit ==
On January 21, 2026, the outdoor apparel company Patagonia, Inc. filed a lawsuit against Wiley and his company, Entrepreneur Enterprises Inc., doing business as Pattie Gonia Productions, alleging trademark infringement and dilution.

Patagonia filed the lawsuit after Pattie Gonia filed a trademark application with the US Patent and Trademark Office seeking exclusive commercial rights to the "Pattie Gonia" brand for clothing, speaking engagements, marketing, and other categories of goods and services. Pattie Gonia has denied using Patagonia's logo to sell merchandise and said the lawsuit is an attempt to "erase" their name and activism.

A scheduling conference in the case was set for June 8, 2026.

== Personal life ==
Pattie Gonia uses she/her and they/them pronouns when in drag. Out of drag, Wiley identifies as a gay male. He lives in Oregon.

== See also ==
- Leah Thomas – Another activist focused on social justice and environmentalism
- Lexi Love – American drag queen involved in a trademark dispute over her name
