= Birdsall =

Birdsall may refer to:

== People ==
- Birdsall (name)

== Places ==
- Birdsall, Michigan, an unincorporated community
- Birdsall, New York, United States
- Birdsall, North Yorkshire, England
- Birdsalls, Ontario, Canada

== Other ==
- Birdsall House, an English country house in Birdsall, North Yorkshire
- Birdsall Lime Kiln, historic structure in Decorah, Iowa, United States
- Birdsall Services Group, a US engineering, environmental and energy consulting firm
