= Holgate Glacier =

Glacier in Alaska, United States

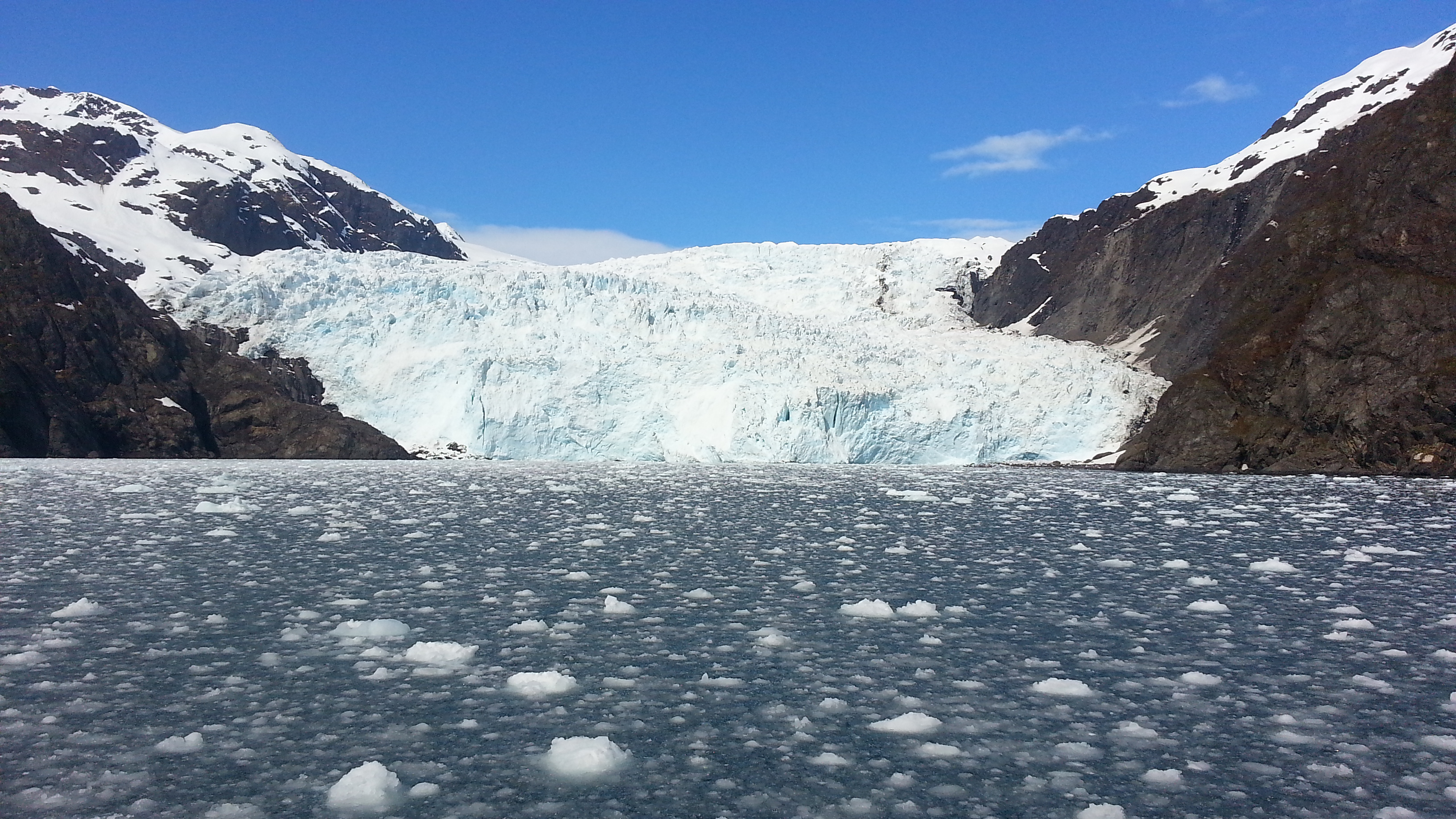

- Location within Alaska
- Interactive map of Holgate Glacier
- Type: Tidewater/mountain glacier (valley glacier)
- Location: Kenai Fjords National Park, Alaska
- Coordinates: 59°52′N 149°55′W
- Terminus: Holgate Arm, Aialik Bay
- Status: Advancing

Holgate Glacier is a glacier located in the U.S. state of Alaska, in Kenai Fjords National Park. It flows outward from the Harding Icefield toward Holgate Arm of Aialik Bay. Tour boats from Seward, Alaska offer tourists the opportunity to view the glacier.

== See also ==
- Glacial lake outburst flood
- Ice calving
- List of glaciers
