= Leah Thomas =

Leah Thomas can refer to:

- Leah Thomas (cyclist), an American cyclist
- Leah Thomas (ecofeminist), an American ecofeminist activist

== See also ==
- Lia Thomas, an American swimmer
