= Ice cap climate =

Polar climate with no monthly mean above 0 °C

Solar radiation has a lower intensity in polar regions because it spread's across a larger surface area due to its oblique angle of approach. It also travels a longer distance through the atmosphere, resulting in a increased absorption and scattering by air molecules in its path.

An ice cap climate is a polar climate where no mean monthly temperature exceeds 0 °C (32 °F). The climate generally covers areas at high altitudes and polar regions (60–90° north and south latitude), such as Antarctica and some of the northernmost islands of Canada and Russia. Most of Greenland is under the influence of an ice cap climate, although the coasts are prone to more influence from the sea, providing more tundra climates. Some regions on the islands of Norway's Svalbard Archipelago facilitate an ice cap climate. Areas with ice cap climates are normally covered by a permanent layer of ice and have no vegetation. There is limited animal life in most ice cap climates, which are usually found near the oceanic margins. Although ice cap climates are inhospitable to human life and no civilian communities lie in such climates, there are some research stations scattered in Antarctica and interior Greenland.

== Description ==
Under the Köppen climate classification, the ice cap climate is denoted as EF. Ice caps are defined as a climate with no months having a mean temperature above 0 °C (32 °F). Such areas are found around the north and south pole, and on the top of many high mountains. Since the temperature never exceeds the melting point of ice, any snow or ice that accumulates remains there permanently, over time forming a large ice sheet.

The ice cap climate is distinct from the tundra climate, or ET. A tundra climate has a summer season with temperatures consistently above freezing for several months. This summer is enough to melt the winter ice cover, which prevents the formation of ice sheets. Because of this, tundras have vegetation, while ice caps do not.

Ice cap climate is the world's coldest climate, and includes the coldest places on Earth. With an average temperature of −55.2 °C (−67.4 °F), Vostok, Antarctica is the coldest place in the world, and has also recorded the lowest temperature, −89.2 °C (−128.6 °F). The following chart indicates the average and record temperatures in this research station through a year:

Climate data for Vostok Station
Month	Jan	Feb	Mar	Apr	May	Jun	Jul	Aug	Sep	Oct	Nov	Dec	Year
Record high °C (°F)	−14.0 (6.8)	−21.0 (−5.8)	−17.7 (0.1)	−33.0 (−27.4)	−38.0 (−36.4)	−33.0 (−27.4)	−34.1 (−29.4)	−34.9 (−30.8)	−34.3 (−29.7)	−30.8 (−23.4)	−24.3 (−11.7)	−14.1 (6.6)	−14.0 (6.8)
Mean daily maximum °C (°F)	−27.0 (−16.6)	−38.7 (−37.7)	−52.9 (−63.2)	−61.1 (−78.0)	−62.0 (−79.6)	−60.6 (−77.1)	−62.4 (−80.3)	−63.9 (−83.0)	−61.6 (−78.9)	−51.5 (−60.7)	−37.2 (−35.0)	−27.1 (−16.8)	−50.5 (−58.9)
Daily mean °C (°F)	−32.0 (−25.6)	−44.3 (−47.7)	−57.9 (−72.2)	−64.8 (−84.6)	−65.8 (−86.4)	−65.3 (−85.5)	−66.7 (−88.1)	−67.9 (−90.2)	−66.0 (−86.8)	−57.1 (−70.8)	−42.6 (−44.7)	−31.8 (−25.2)	−55.2 (−67.3)
Mean daily minimum °C (°F)	−37.5 (−35.5)	−50.0 (−58.0)	−61.8 (−79.2)	−67.8 (−90.0)	−69.1 (−92.4)	−68.9 (−92.0)	−70.4 (−94.7)	−71.5 (−96.7)	−70.2 (−94.4)	−63.1 (−81.6)	−49.8 (−57.6)	−38.0 (−36.4)	−59.8 (−75.7)
Record low °C (°F)	−56.4 (−69.5)	−64.0 (−83.2)	−76.4 (−105.5)	−86.0 (−122.8)	−81.2 (−114.2)	−83.8 (−118.8)	−89.2 (−128.6)	−88.3 (−126.9)	−85.9 (−122.6)	−79.4 (−110.9)	−63.9 (−83.0)	−50.1 (−58.2)	−89.2 (−128.6)
Average precipitation mm (inches)	1.0 (0.04)	0.7 (0.03)	2.0 (0.08)	2.4 (0.09)	2.8 (0.11)	2.5 (0.10)	2.2 (0.09)	2.3 (0.09)	2.4 (0.09)	1.9 (0.07)	1.1 (0.04)	0.7 (0.03)	22 (0.9)
Average relative humidity (%)	70.1	68.6	66.2	64.7	64.7	65.5	65.7	65.8	66.2	67.4	68.7	69.8	67
Mean monthly sunshine hours	696.4	566.8	347.3	76.3	0.0	0.0	0.0	0.0	203.4	480.2	682.3	708.8	3,761.5
Mean daily sunshine hours	22.5	20.2	11.2	2.5	0.0	0.0	0.0	0.0	6.8	15.5	22.7	22.9	10.4
Source 1:
Source 2: Pogoda.ru.net (data for record highs/lows, except for March and August lows, and March high); (March record low), (August record low), and (March record high)

== Locations ==
The two major areas with ice cap climates are Antarctica and Greenland. Some of the most northern islands of Canada and Russia, along with some regions and islands of Norway's Svalbard Archipelago also have ice cap climates.

=== Extreme northern latitudes ===
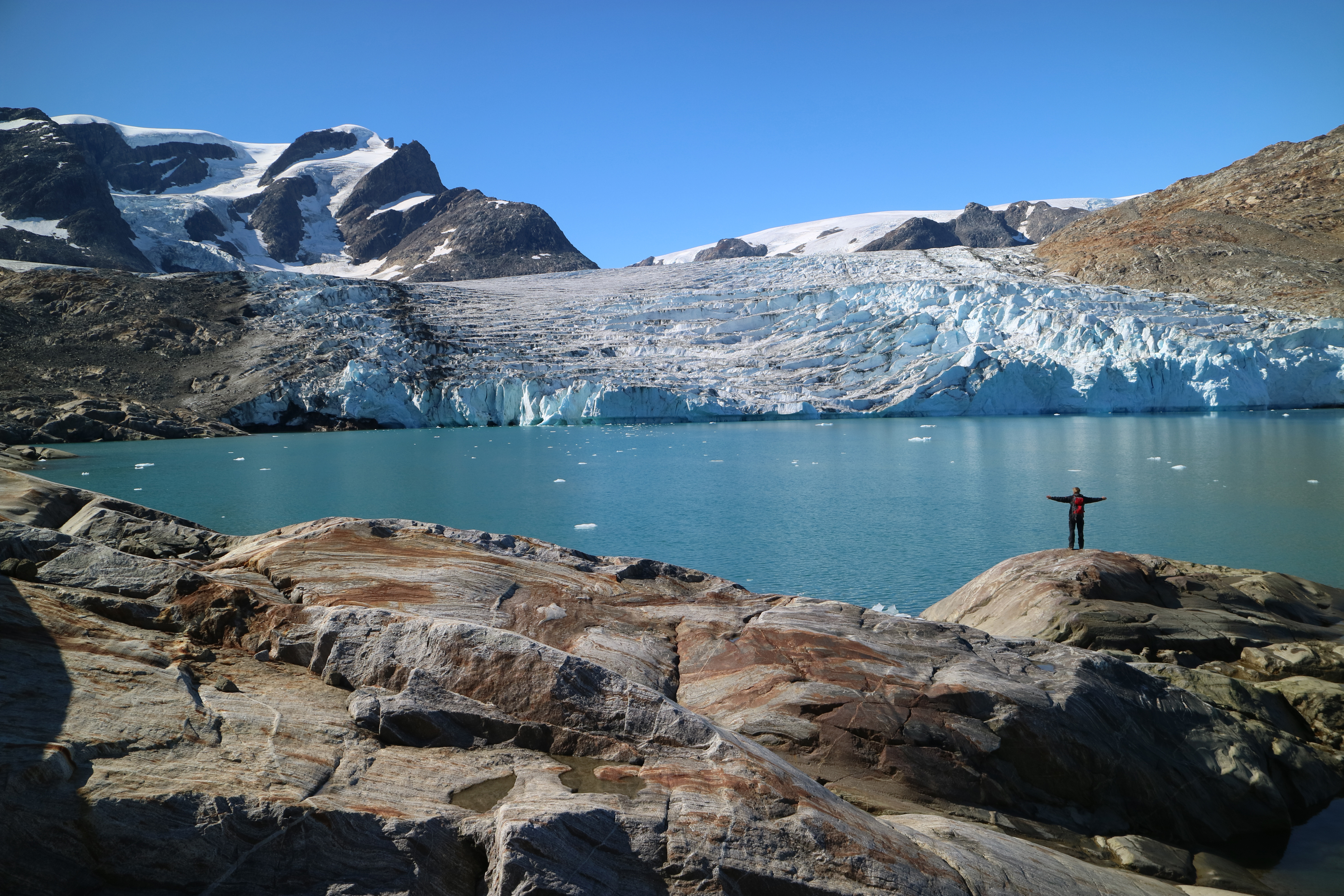
Hann Glacier, Greenland

The Arctic Ocean is located in the Arctic region. As a result, the northern polar ice cap is the frozen part of that ocean's surface. The only large landmass in the extreme northern latitudes to have an icecap climate is Greenland, but several smaller islands near the Arctic Ocean also have permanent ice caps. Some places such as Alert, Nunavut despite being characterized as a tundra climate share some characteristics of an ice cap climate, in that although Alert averages above freezing during July and August, during most years the snow does not completely melt except what is in direct sunlight and will often persist from year to year many years in a row without melting completely, but not enough remains to form any kind of glaciation.

Ice cap climates are not nearly as common on land in the extreme northern latitudes as in Antarctica. This is because the Arctic Ocean moderates the temperatures of the surrounding land, making the extreme cold seen in Antarctica impossible. In fact, the coldest winters in the northern hemisphere are in subarctic climates in Siberia, such as Verkhoyansk, which are much farther inland and lack the ocean's moderating effect. This same lack of moderating oceanic effect, coupled with the extreme continentality of the Russian interior allows for very warm summers in the same areas that experience harsh winters.

=== Extreme southern latitudes ===
The continent of Antarctica is centered on the South Pole. Antarctica is surrounded on all sides by the Southern Ocean. As a result, high-speed winds circle around Antarctica, preventing warmer air from temperate zones from reaching the continent.

While Antarctica does have some small areas of tundra on the northern fringes, the vast majority of the continent is extremely cold and permanently frozen. Because it is climatically isolated from the rest of the Earth, the continent has extreme cold not seen anywhere else, and weather systems rarely penetrate into the continent.

=== Extreme altitudes ===
Mountain glaciers are widespread, especially in the Andes, the Himalayas, the Rocky Mountains, the Caucasus, and the Alps.

== Geologic history ==
Ice cap climates only occur during icehouse Earth periods. There have been five such periods in the Earth's past. Outside these periods, the Earth seems to have been ice-free even in high latitudes. Factors that cause icehouse Earth include changes to the atmosphere, the arrangement of continents, and the energy received from the sun. Earth is currently in an icehouse period.

== Ice sheets ==
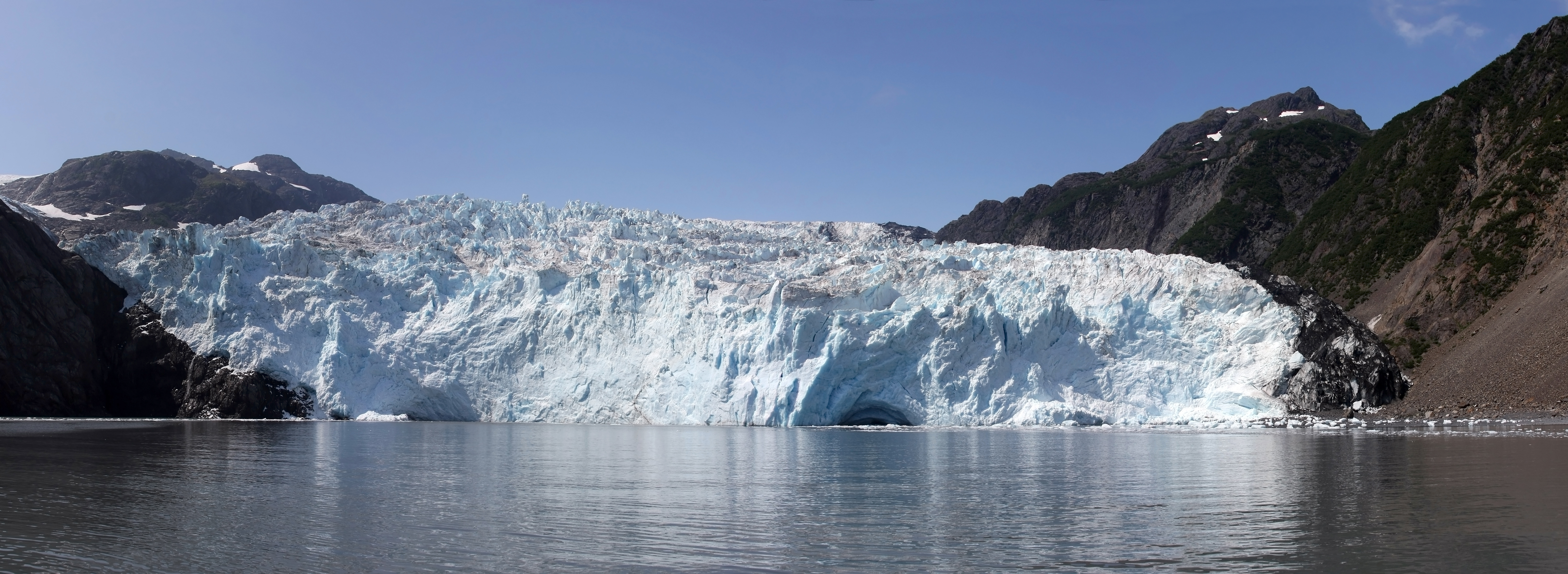
Aialik Glacier, Alaska

The constant freezing temperatures cause the formation of large ice sheets in ice cap climates. These ice sheets, however, are not static, but slowly move off the continents into the surrounding waters. New snow and ice accumulation then replaces the ice that is lost. Precipitation is nearly non-existent in ice cap climates. It is never warm enough for rain, and usually too cold to generate snow. However, wind can blow snow onto the ice sheets from nearby tundras.

Ice sheets are often miles thick. Much of the land located under ice sheets is actually below sea level, and would be under the ocean if the ice were removed. It is the weight of the ice itself that forces this land below sea level. If the ice was removed, the land would rise back up in an effect called post-glacial rebound. This effect is creating new land in formerly ice cap areas such as Sweden.

The extreme pressure exerted by the ice allows for the formation of liquid water at low temperatures that would otherwise result in ice, while the ice sheet itself insulates liquid water from the cold above. The causes the formation of subglacial lakes, the largest being Lake Vostok in Antarctica.

== Life ==
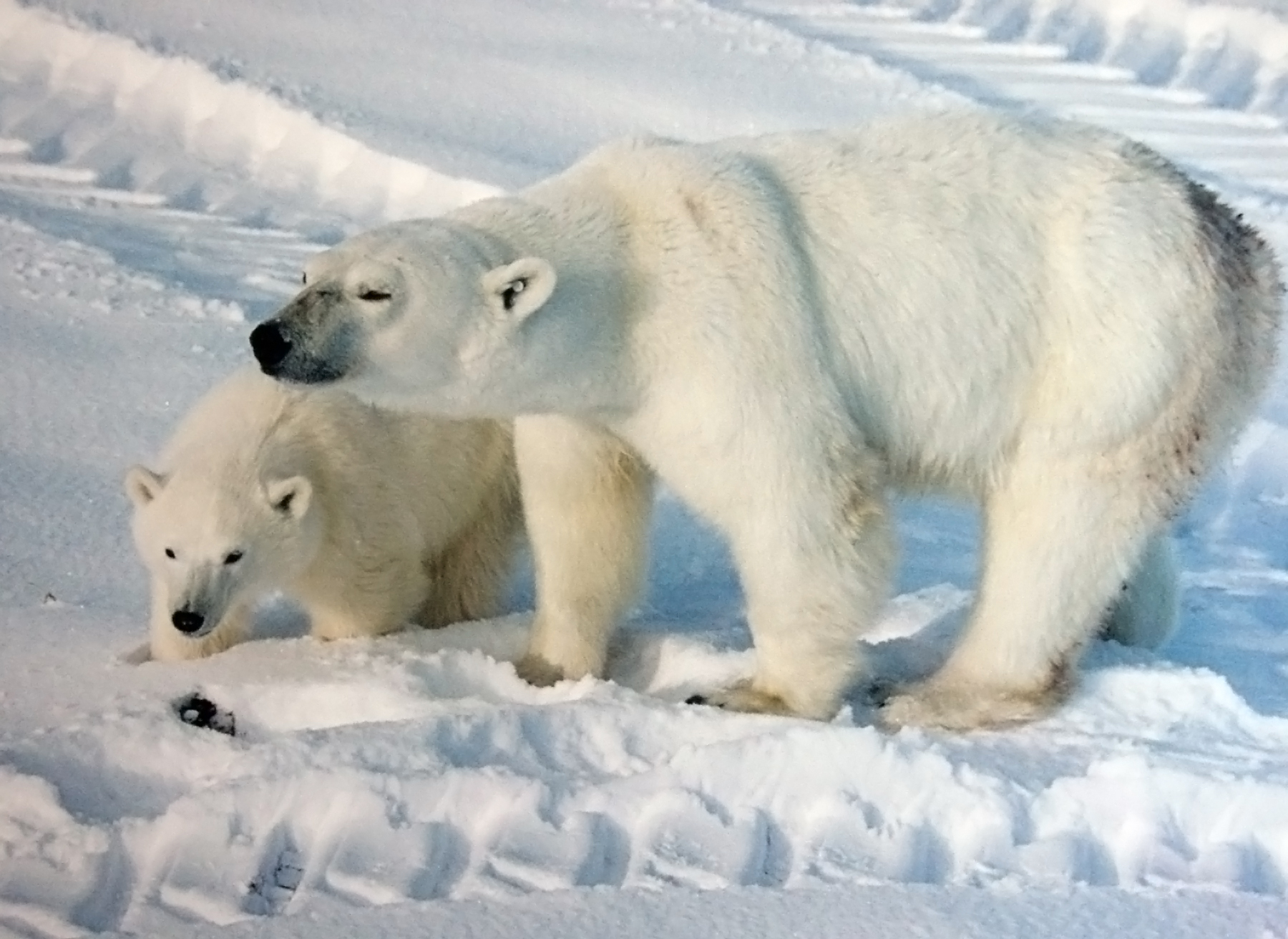
A polar bear with cub

There is very little surface life in ice cap climates. Vegetation cannot grow on ice, and is non-existent except in the warmer fringes that occasionally peak above freezing; even then, it is confined to mosses and lichen. However, the fringes of ice caps do have significant animal and plant life. Most of this life feeds on life in the surrounding oceans. Well known examples are polar bears in the northern region and penguins in Antarctica. Vegetation and soils are removed from valley floors by ice caps, and research has found a "positive feedback between permafrost degradation and vegetation encroachment".
