= Aialik Glacier =

Glacier in Alaska, United States

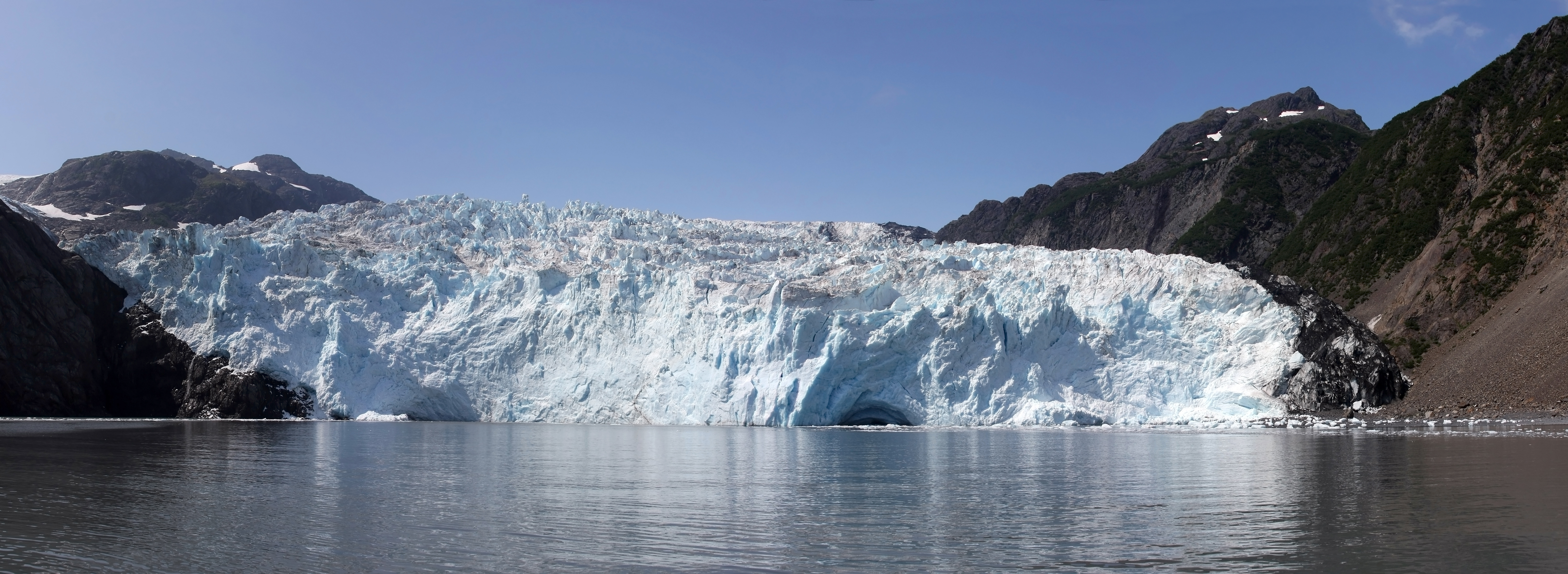
- Aialik Glacier Panorama

- Location within Alaska
- Interactive map of Aialik Glacier
- Type: Tidewater glacier
- Location: Kenai Peninsula Borough, Alaska, U.S.
- Coordinates: 59°58′05″N 149°47′59″W
- Terminus: Aialik Bay

The Aialik Glacier is a glacier in the Kenai Peninsula Borough of Alaska. It drains into Aialik Bay. Part of Kenai Fjords National Park, it (along with many other glaciers) drains the Harding Icefield. Aialik Glacier, a little over 15 miles from Seward, is the largest glacier in Aialik Bay, located in Kenai Fjords National Park. While fairly stable, the glacier calves most actively in May and June.

A mural of two kayakers near the glacier painted by Byron Birdsall is at the office of the Kenai Fjords National Park.

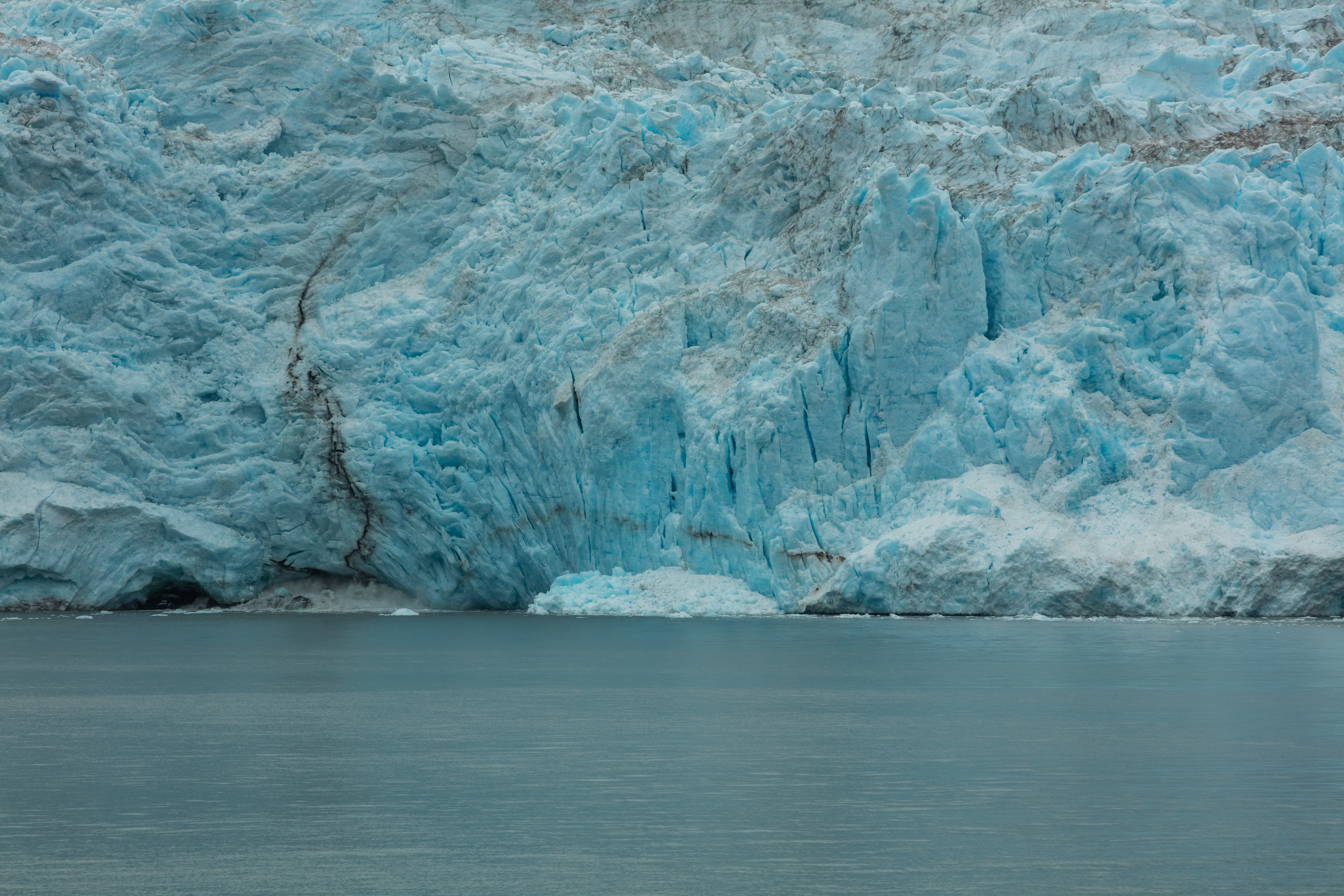
Detail view of the glacier.

== See also ==
- List of glaciers and icefields
- List of glaciers in the United States#Alaska
