= Aialik Peninsula =

Peninsula in Alaska

Coordinates: 59.847°N 149.616°W

Aialik Peninsula is a peninsula on the larger Kenai Peninsula of the U.S. state of Alaska, which lies roughly 15 miles southwest of Seward. The peninsula has a peculiar Swiss cheese-like shape, making it appear partially sunken. It contains very rugged geography, with its twisted and winding coastline indented by many bays and coves that are part of Aialik Bay to the west, and Resurrection Bay to the east. The peninsula is uninhabited, but private lands and beaches to anchor at and camp exist. All land here is accessible by boat only. Pony Cove, on the peninsula's eastern shore in Resurrection Bay is a popular boating and salmon fishing spot in the summers. The Aialik Peninsula is roughly 15 miles long, running from near Lechner Glacier and Bear Glacier to Aialik Cape at its southern extremity.
