= Birdsell =

Birdsell is a surname. Notable people with the surname include:

- Bob Birdsell (born 1947), Canadian hockey player
- John Birdsell (1815–1894), American manufacturer and inventor
- Joseph Birdsell (1908–1994), American anthropologist
- Regina Birdsell (born 1956), American politician
- Sandra Birdsell (born 1942), Canadian author

== See also ==
- Birdsall (name)
