= Byron Birdsall =

American painter (1937–2016)

- Born: December 18, 1937; Buckeye, Arizona, U.S.
- Died: December 4, 2016 (aged 78); Whidbey Island, Washington, U.S.
- Education: Seattle Pacific University; Stanford University
- Occupation: Painter
- Spouses: Lynn Birdsall; Billie Birdsall
- Children: 1 son, 1 daughter

Byron Birdsall (December 18, 1937 – December 4, 2016) was an American painter. He was "one of Alaska's most renowned watercolorists" according to the Alaska Daily News.

== Early life ==
Byron Birdsall was born on December 18, 1937, in Buckeye, Arizona. He grew up in Los Angeles, California, where his father was a Christian minister.

Birdsall graduated from the Seattle Pacific University and Stanford University.

== Career ==
Birdsall started his career as a history teacher in California. After teaching for six years, he worked in advertising in Alaska.

Birdsall was a prolific painter in Alaska for five decades. He painted landscapes and portraits, both in watercolour and oil paintings. He did many paintings of Anchorage.

Birdsall did prints from the early part of his career onwards. For example, he designed a limited edition of 500 prints for the commemoration of the dedication of the Russian Bishop's House in 1988. Meanwhile, in 1991, Birdsall designed stamps for the state of Alaska. At the Seward Music & Arts Festival in Seward, Alaska in September 2015, he did a mural with 50-60 volunteers representing two kayakers at the Aialik Glacier for the main building of the Kenai Fjords National Park.

Birdsall was the author of several art books.

== Personal life and death ==
Birdsall was married twice. With his first wife Lynn, who was a watercolourist, he had a son, Joshua, and a daughter, Courtenay. After his first wife died of cancer in 1998, he married Bilie, with whom he resided in Anchorage, Alaska and on Whidbey Island in Washington.

Birdsall died of heart failure on December 4, 2016.

== Works ==
- Birdsall, Byron (1985). The art of Byron Birdsall : an evolution. Anchorage, Alaska: Artique Ltd. OCLC 50771958.
- Birdsall, Byron (1993). Byron Birdsall's Alaska and other exotic worlds. Portland, Oregon: Graphic Arts Center. ISBN 9780945397168. OCLC 27034225.
- Birdsall, Byron; Garvey, Mike (2009). People of the Saltchuk : paintings by Byron Birdsall. Seattle, Washington: Documentary Media. ISBN 9781933245171. OCLC 405107116.
- Birdsall, Byron; Stabenow, Dana (2015). Byron Birdsall's Alaska. Portland, Oregon: Alaska Northwest Books. ISBN 9781941821503. OCLC 894308011.
