= Aialik Bay =

- Dora Passage
- Бухта Аялыкская (Russian)
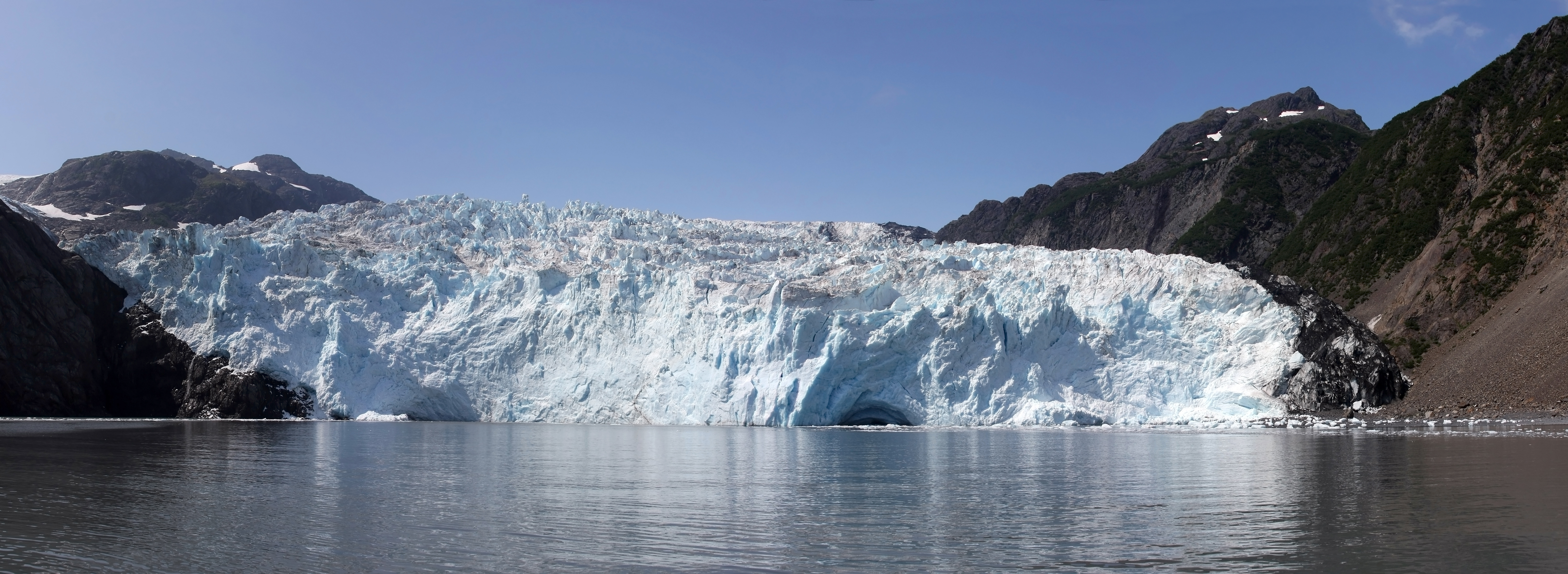
- Panoramic view of Aialik Glacier and Bay

- Location within Alaska
- Location: Kenai Peninsula, Alaska
- Coordinates: 59.843862°N 149.711218°W
- Type: Bay
- Etymology: Eskimo name translated to Russian: Bukhta Ayalikskaya
- Primary inflows: Skee River, Lechner Creek, Pedersen River
- Ocean/sea sources: North Pacific Ocean
- Basin countries: United States
- Max. length: 22 mi (35 km)
- Max. width: 8 mi (13 km)
- Average depth: 500 ft (150 m)
- Max. depth: 984 ft (300 m)
- Islands: Squab Island, Slate Island, Twin Islands, Harbor Island
- Sections/sub-basins: Aialik Sill, Pedersen Lagoon, Holgate Arm, Quicksand Cove, McMullen Cove, Verdant Cove, Abra Cove, Coleman Bay, Tooth Cove, Bear Cove, Three Hole Bay, Paradise Cove, Cliff Bay, Chat Cove, Dora Passage

Aialik Bay, (Russian:Бухта Аялыкская) also known as Dora Passage between Harbor Island and the Harris Peninsula, is a fjord on the Kenai Peninsula of Alaska, United States. It has no permanent settlements, but there are two public use cabins located on the bay, one at its head and another at Holgate Arm. The Kenai Fjords lodge also hosts visitors. Aialik Bay is 33 miles south of Seward. The bay received its name from Russians recording the indigenous name as "Ayalyk Bay". It is likely that the bay once terminated at Aialik Sill, by Pedersen Lagoon prior to the year 1700. At this sill, the bay's bottom rises to less than 60 feet below sea level, and is as shallow as 18 feet deep in some places. Aialik Glacier, which has created the bay via the process of overdeepening, has since retreated by 4.5 miles.

It is a major destination within the Kenai Fjords National Park, as many water taxis, kayak tours, anglers, and recreational boaters use the bay to access its many coves.

== Geography ==
At its head, Aialik Bay hosts the tidewater Aialik Glacier, along with Skee Glacier. Other glaciers flowing directly or indirectly into the bay include Pedersen Glacier, Addison Glacier, and Lechner Glacier. It has a maximum depth of 984 feet (300 m), between McMullen Cove and Three Hole Bay. It contains many sub-basins, most notably Holgate Arm, with the advancing Holgate Glacier. To the west, Aialik Bay is bordered by the Harris Peninsula and the adjacent Harris Bay and Northwestern Fjord. To the east, the bay is bounded by the Aialik Peninsula and Resurrection Bay.

== Campsites ==
Though the bay is part of Kenai Fjords National Park, it can only be accessed by boat. Abra Cove is a popular camping spot featuring freshwater, tall cliffs, waterfalls, and views of glaciers. Verdant Cove, Tooth Cove, McMullen Cove, Pedersen Lagoon, and Bear Cove also have landing beaches and are sailing/camping destinations during Alaska's summers.
