= Birdsall Lime Kiln =

- U.S. National Register of Historic Places
- Location within Iowa Location within the United States
- Location: Northeast of Decorah
- Coordinates: 43°18′11.5″N 91°46′03″W
- Built: 1877
- Built by: J.A. Birdsall
- NRHP reference No.: 79000948
- Added to NRHP: March 21, 1979

Birdsall Lime Kiln is a historic structure located northeast of Decorah, Iowa, United States. Built in 1877, the kiln is 24 feet (7 m) high, and composed of irregularly-cut undressed limestone and exterior wood bracing. Its inside walls are lined with locally produced firebrick. The lime was produced from abundant native limestone. It was used in mortar for masonry construction, and by the Winneshiek Paper Company of Freeport, Iowa in its paper-making processes. The structure was listed on the National Register of Historic Places in 1979.
