= Richard Birdsall =

English land surveyor in Upper Canada (1799–1852)

- Born: 1799; Thornton-le-Dale, England
- Died: January 21, 1852 (aged 52–53); Bailieboro, Upper Canada
- Occupation: Surveyor
- Years active: 1819–1852
- Known for: Surveying several townships in Ontario
- Spouses: Elizabeth Burnham (1821–1827); Charlotte Jane Everett (1836–1852)

Richard Birdsall (1799 – 21 January 1852) was a British-born Upper Canadian land surveyor, land agent, politician, justice of the peace, and militia officer. Born in rural Yorkshire, England, he emigrated to Upper Canada in 1817, settling initially in the Township of Vaughan. Birdsall received a license for land surveying in 1819 and began his career that same year. Birdsall surveyed many areas in Newcastle District as well as other parts of what is now Southern Ontario, establishing the boundaries of many townships of the province and laying out the roads and farming lots within them.

== Early life ==
Birdsall was born sometime in 1799 in Thornton-le-Dale, a small village in the northeast of Yorkshire, England. He was schooled in the nearby village of Londesborough, graduating in 1817. His parents had hoped this education would be followed by a career in the Royal Navy, however with the conclusion of the wars in both Europe and North America, the prospects for a naval career seemed slim. Birdsall instead chose to pursue opportunities in the growing colony of Upper Canada. His education made him a qualified candidate for becoming a surveyor. Upon his arrival in Upper Canada he set to acquire the requisite licensing, which included performing an apprenticeship under Deputy Surveyor Reuben Sherwood.

== Career ==
Birdsall's career began in 1819, when he received a license to be a deputy land surveyor in Upper Canada. Shortly thereafter, he was hired by Zacheus Burnham, a militia captain and land speculator residing in Hamilton Township. Burnham had in 1818 received the contracts by the colonial government to survey several townships in the vicinity of Rice Lake. Burnham, in turn, hired Birdsall to complete these surveys. Birdsall steadily worked through these contracts, surveying Otonabee Township in 1819, Asphodel Township in 1820, Douro Township and Dummer Township in 1823, and the town site for Peterborough in 1825. Birdsall also undertook surveying jobs elsewhere in the colony, unaffiliated with the Burnham contracts. Such jobs included the surveying of part of Innisfil Township in 1820.

In addition to his role as a surveyor, Birdsall secured for himself several important civil positions. In 1822 Birdsall was made a captain in the 2nd Regiment, Northumberland militia, and in 1827 he was appointed a justice of the peace for Newcastle District. During this time he married Elizabeth Burnham, the daughter of his surveying employer Zaccheus Burnham, and had four children with her. Birdsall established a farmstead with her in Asphodel Township, where Elizabeth died as a result of an accident in 1827.

Birdsall continued surveying despite his new civic duties, albeit with less intensity. In 1830 he completed the survey of Smith Township, which had only been partially done in 1818. He also worked with fellow surveyor William Hawkins on establishing the northern boundary of the Huron Tract. By 1830 Birdsall had also become an agent for the Canada Company, tasked with inspecting settlers on company land throughout the colony for compliance with the developmental terms of settlement. In order to keep their land settlers were required to clear it, establish proper housing on it, and turn it into a viable farm within a period of a few years. These inspections occupied most of Birdsall's attention for the remainder of his life.

Birdsall's rank of captain in the local militia put him in charge of the Asphodel contingent when the militia was activated in response to the Upper Canada Rebellion in 1837, though it appears his contingent was not involved in any notable incidents. Immediately following the end of the rebellion Birdsall paid to raise and equip a new militia battalion based in Peterborough. The summer before the rebellion, Birdsall married for a second time, to Charlotte Jane Everett of Belleville, and this union produced four children.

=== Political career ===
As a judicial officer, Birdsall was extensively involved with the litigation that followed the 1838 construction of a dam on the Trent River near Hastings, Ontario. The dam caused the water levels in Rice Lake to rise, damaging many waterfront properties in the area. His exposure to many of the inhabitants of the District in his roles as justice and land agent formed the basis for his transition into politics. Upon the creation of Colborne District in 1841, Birdsall became the representative for Asphodel Township on the District Council for two years. This was followed by an attempt to join the Parliament of the newly created Province of Canada. While Birdsall chose not to run in the election in 1844 to represent Peterborough, he did campaign in the election of 1848. This saw a splitting of the vote with another Conservative candidate, resulting in a victory for the Reform candidate.

In 1850, the Districts in Canada were replaced by Counties, and political offices for the municipalities were created. Birdsall became the first Reeve of Asphodel Township, while representing Asphodel on the council of the new Peterborough County. Two years into this role, while on a business trip to Cavan Township, Birdsall fell ill with pneumonia, from which he did not recover. Birdsall died of this illness on 21 January 1852 in Bailieboro. He is buried at St. Michael's Anglican Church in Westwood, a few miles from his homestead.

== See also ==
- Richard Birdsall Rogers
