= Birdsall S. Viault =

American historian (1932–2012)

Birdsall S. Viault (1932–2012) was Professor Emeritus of History at Winthrop University (1968–1997), Rock Hill, South Carolina. He has also taught at Adelphi University (1959–1968), where he had attained his B.S. and M.A. degrees. He succeeded at gaining an M.A. (1957) and Ph.D. (1963) in history while studying at Duke University. He also studied at the Leibniz Kolleg of the University of Tübingen, Germany.

Viault is the author of several McGraw-Hill books that have been widely used in college courses. His articles and reviews have appeared in journals in the United States and Europe. His articles include: "Le 20 juillet 1944 vu d'Amerique," Guerres Mondiales et Conflits Contemporains, no. 163, July 1991. He was a consultant on Modern European History for Merriam-Webster's Collegiate Encyclopedia (2000).

== Books ==
- Modern European History ISBN 0-07-067453-1
- American History Since 1865 ISBN 0-07-067452-3
- English History ISBN 0-07-067437-X
- Western Civilization Since 1600 ISBN 0-07-015396-5
- World History in the 20th Century New York: College Notes, 1969.
