= Exit Glacier =

Glacier on the Kenai Peninsula in southern Alaska

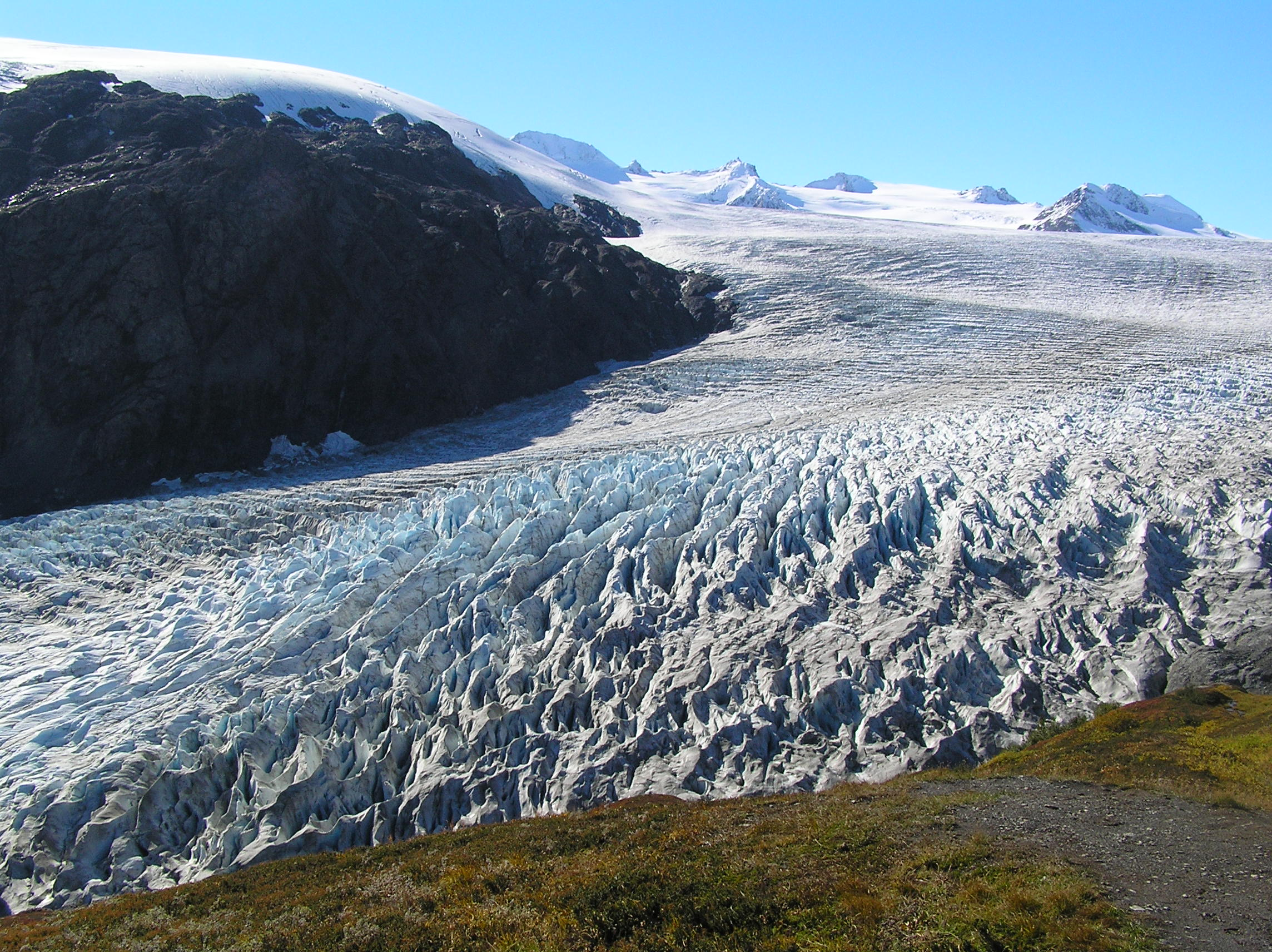
- Exit Glacier

- Location within Alaska
- Interactive map of Exit Glacier
- Type: Valley glacier
- Location: Kenai Fjords National Park, Alaska, U.S.
- Coordinates: 60°10′N 149°42′W
- Area: 4 miles (6.4 km)
- Terminus: Moraine/river
- Status: Receding

Exit Glacier is a glacier derived from the Harding Icefield in the Kenai Mountains of Alaska and one of Kenai Fjords National Park's major attractions. It is one of the most accessible valley glaciers in Alaska and is a visible indicator of glacial recession due to climate change. Exit Glacier retreated approximately 187 feet (57 m) from 2013 to 2014 and park scientists continue to monitor and record the glacier's accelerating recession.

It received its name for serving as the exit for the first recorded crossing of the Harding Icefield in 1968.

== History ==
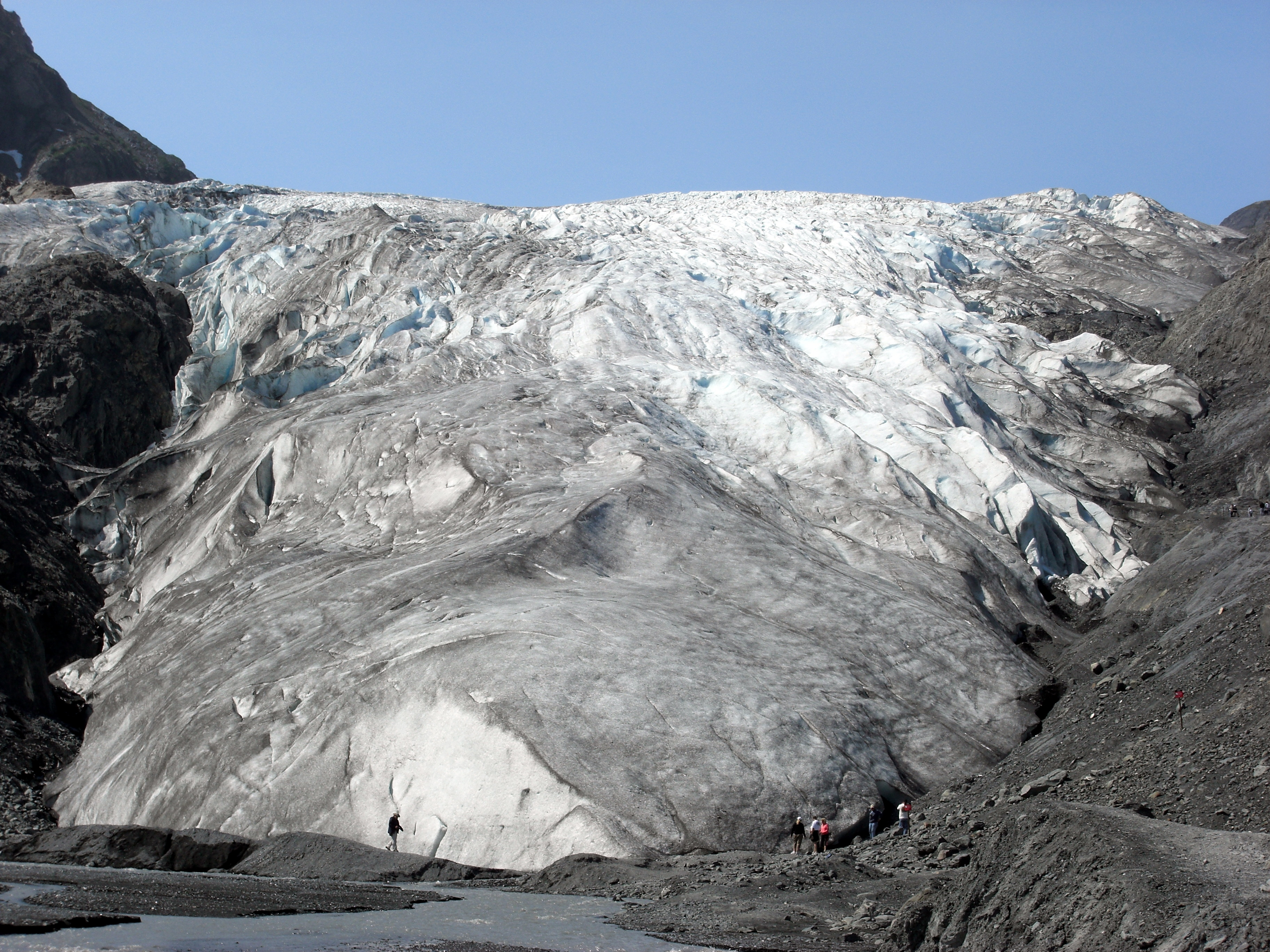
Exit Glacier in July 2009

In the spring of 1968, the first documented mountaineering party succeeded in crossing the Harding Icefield. Ten people were involved in the crossing, which went from Chernof Glacier east to Resurrection Glacier (Later renamed Exit as the newspaper reported that the group would be descending the "Exit Glacier"). Expedition members included Bill Babcock, Eric Barnes, Bill Fox, Dave Johnston, Yule Kilcher and his son Otto, Dave Spencer, Helmut Tschaffert, and Vin and Grace (Jansen) Hoeman. As noted above, Yule Kilcher, Dave Johnston, Vin Hoeman, and Grace Hoeman were veterans of previous attempts; of the ten, only four–Bill Babcock, Dave Johnston, Yule Kilcher, and Vin Hoeman–hiked all the way across the icefield. The expedition left Homer on April 17, bound for Chernof Glacier; eight days later, they descended Exit Glacier and arrived in Seward. Along the way, the party made a first-ever ascent of Truuli Peak, a 6,612-foot (2,015 m) eminence that protrudes from the northwestern edge of the icefield near Truuli Glacier.

Exit Glacier was one of the major landmarks that President Barack Obama visited during his historic trip to Alaska in 2015. The rapid retreat of the glacier highlights the effects of climate change and how it affects Alaska's coastal glaciers.

== Access ==
The Exit Glacier is especially notable for being a drive up glacier (similar to the Mendenhall Glacier of Juneau). A spur road off the Seward Highway leads to the only road accessible portion of the Kenai Fjords National Park. A system of hiking trails lead to the terminus of the glacier and up to the Harding Icefield itself. Although it is one of the Harding Icefield's smaller glaciers, it is one of the most visited because of its easy accessibility and abundant hiking trails around and above the glacier. Exit Glacier is accessible year-round. Upon the arrival of snow, usually in mid-November, the road is closed to cars but open to a wide range of winter recreation: from snow machines, dogsleds, fat-tire bicycles, and cross-country skiers.

== Ranger programs ==
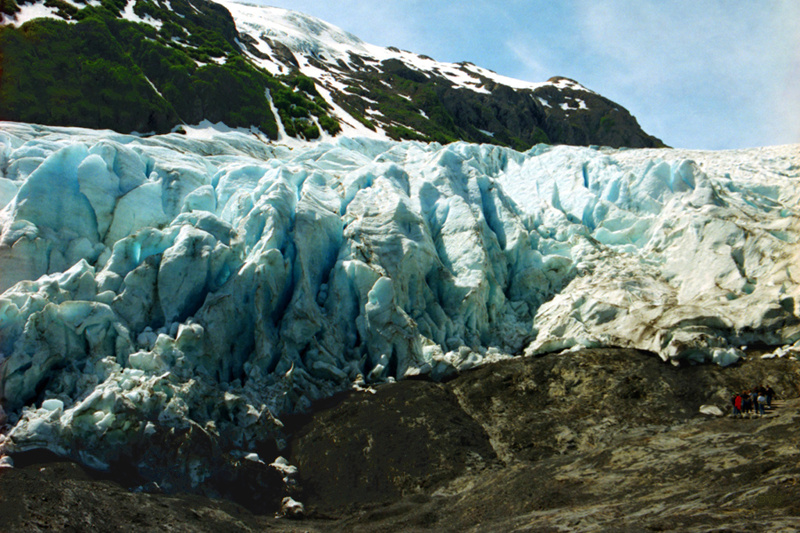
A guided tour group pauses along the Harding Icefield trail in 2002

Ranger-led walks to Exit Glacier are available at 10 am, 11 am, 1 pm, and 2 pm daily during the summer season. These walks are approximately 1–2 hours long. "Ranger Talks" are held in the Exit Glacier Pavilion at 12:30 pm. These last approximately 20–30 minutes. A guided hike to Marmot Meadows along the Harding Icefield trail is also available every day of the summer season at 9 am and lasts 3 to 4 hours.

== Climate ==
Seward 8 NW, is a weather station at the foot of Exit Glacier, near the Exit Glacier trailhead and campground. Exit Glacier has a subarctic climate (Köppen Dfc), with long, cold winters and short, cool summers.

Climate data for Seward 8 NW, Alaska, 1991–2020 normals, 1983–2020 extremes: 424ft (129m)
Month	Jan	Feb	Mar	Apr	May	Jun	Jul	Aug	Sep	Oct	Nov	Dec	Year
Record high °F (°C)	42 (6)	43 (6)	48 (9)	55 (13)	69 (21)	77 (25)	77 (25)	75 (24)	66 (19)	55 (13)	43 (6)	41 (5)	77 (25)
Mean daily maximum °F (°C)	25.4 (−3.7)	31.4 (−0.3)	37.9 (3.3)	46.1 (7.8)	56.8 (13.8)	64.7 (18.2)	67.3 (19.6)	65.0 (18.3)	56.6 (13.7)	44.8 (7.1)	31.6 (−0.2)	27.3 (−2.6)	46.2 (7.9)
Daily mean °F (°C)	16.4 (−8.7)	21.3 (−5.9)	25.8 (−3.4)	35.0 (1.7)	44.0 (6.7)	51.4 (10.8)	55.1 (12.8)	52.6 (11.4)	45.6 (7.6)	35.1 (1.7)	23.1 (−4.9)	18.7 (−7.4)	35.3 (1.9)
Mean daily minimum °F (°C)	7.4 (−13.7)	11.2 (−11.6)	13.7 (−10.2)	24.0 (−4.4)	31.2 (−0.4)	38.0 (3.3)	42.9 (6.1)	40.2 (4.6)	34.6 (1.4)	25.3 (−3.7)	14.7 (−9.6)	10.1 (−12.2)	24.4 (−4.2)
Record low °F (°C)	−42 (−41)	−34 (−37)	−24 (−31)	−17 (−27)	15 (−9)	22 (−6)	30 (−1)	19 (−7)	9 (−13)	−10 (−23)	−18 (−28)	−22 (−30)	−42 (−41)
Average precipitation inches (mm)	6.97 (177)	5.24 (133)	5.16 (131)	4.16 (106)	2.97 (75)	2.10 (53)	2.67 (68)	5.66 (144)	8.43 (214)	9.34 (237)	5.75 (146)	8.96 (228)	67.41 (1,712)
Average snowfall inches (cm)	31.6 (80)	30.0 (76)	27.6 (70)	4.3 (11)	0.3 (0.76)	0.0 (0.0)	0.0 (0.0)	0.0 (0.0)	trace	7.5 (19)	21.7 (55)	41.8 (106)	164.8 (417.76)
Source 1: NOAA (1981-2010 precipitation)
Source 2: XMACIS2 (snow & records)

== Wildlife ==
- American black bear
- Hoary marmot
- Mountain goat
- Western screech owl
- Great horned owl
- Boreal owl
- Northern saw-whet owl
- Steller's jay
- Black-billed magpie
- Horned lark
- Violet-green swallow
- Warblers
- Snow bunting
- Ice worms

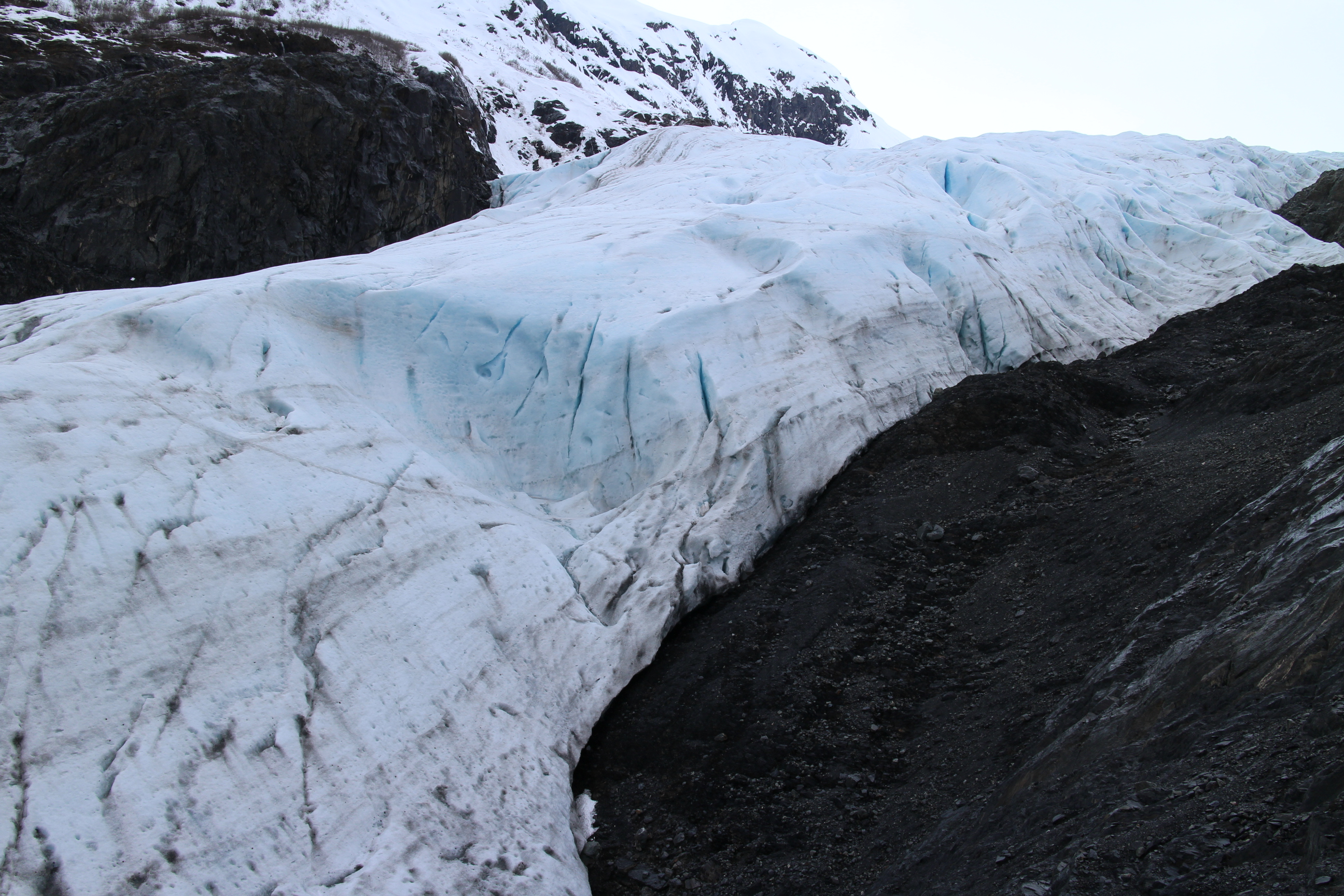
Exit Glacier in May 2015

== See also ==
- List of glaciers and icefields
- Exit Glacier, Kenai Fjords National Park Project Jukebox
