= Horatio L. Birdsall =

US Army soldier and Medal of Honor recipient (1833–1891)

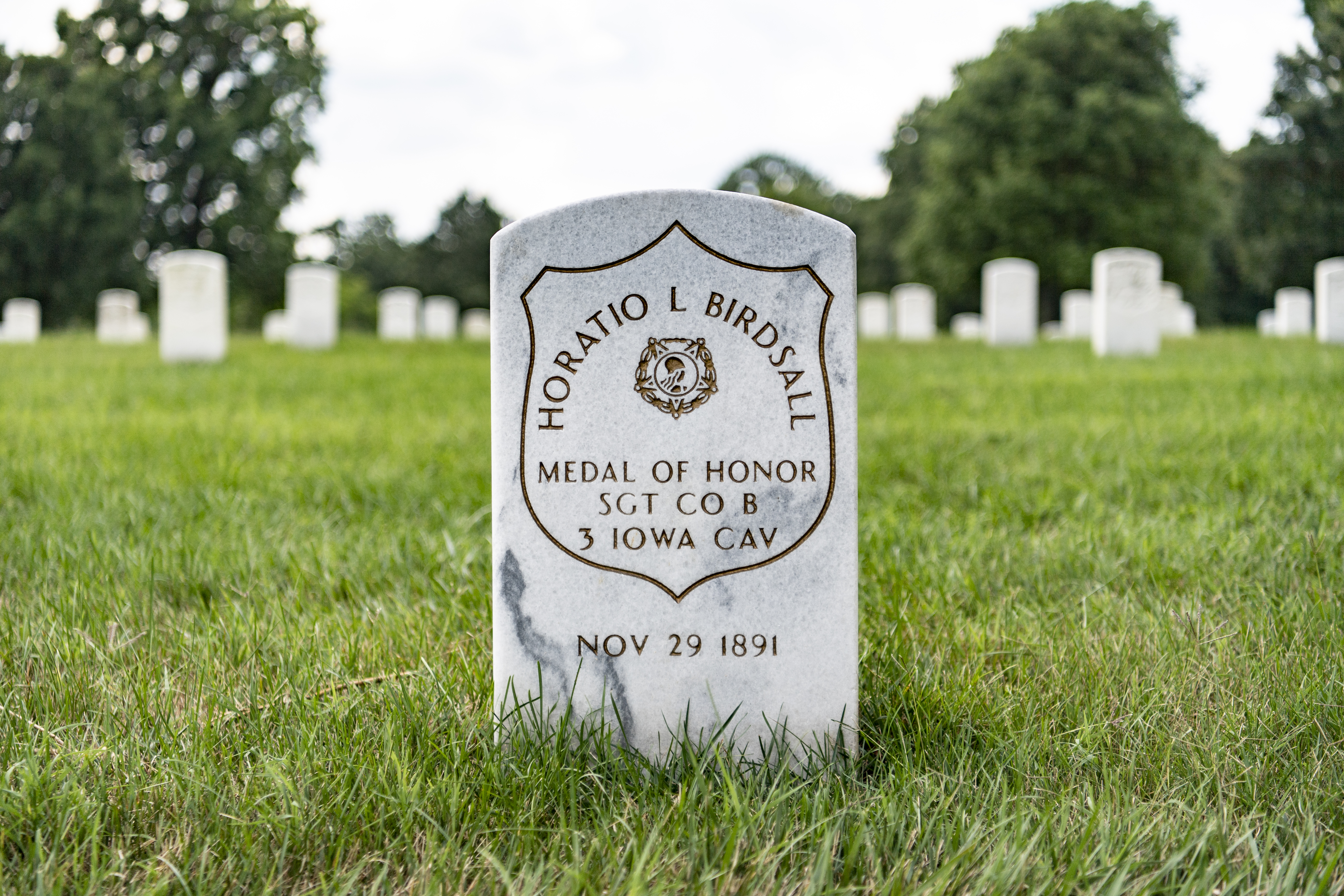
- Grave at Arlington National Cemetery
- Born: July 16, 1833; Monroe County, New York, US
- Died: November 29, 1891 (aged 57–58); Creede, Mineral County, Colorado, US
- Burial place: Arlington National Cemetery
- Military career
- Allegiance: United States of America; Union
- Branch: United States Army; Union Army
- Service years: 1861–1865
- Rank: Sergeant
- Unit: 3rd Regiment Iowa Volunteer Cavalry
- Conflicts: American Civil War; Battle of Columbus
- Awards: Medal of Honor

Horatio Latin Birdsall (July 16, 1833 – November 29, 1891) was a sergeant who served the Union Army during the American Civil War. He was part of Company B in the 3rd Regiment Iowa Volunteer Cavalry. Birdsall was awarded a Medal of Honor.

== Early life ==
Birdsall was born in Monroe County, New York.

== Service ==
Birdsall, at the time of the Civil War's breakout, was an inhabitant of Iowa. He enlisted in the 3rd Iowa Cavalry at Keokuk. When General James H. Wilson moved on Columbus, Georgia, the 3rd Regiment accompanied him. In the Battle of Columbus, Birdsall and his regiment attacked a series of Confederate entrenchments that protected a bridge over the Chattahoochee River. The Regiment captured the entrenchments and bridge; Birdsall captured the Confederate flag-bearer and the flag. For the capture of the flagbearer, Birdsall won the Medal of Honor.

During the war, Birdsall lost a part of his right thumb and was wounded in the head.

== Later life and death ==
Birdsall moved to Lawrence, Kansas after the war ended. He died November 29, 1891, and was buried at Arlington National Cemetery, Arlington, Virginia.

== See also ==
- List of Medal of Honor recipients
