= Birdsall Services Group =

- Trade name: BSG
- Traded as: Birdsall
- Industry: Engineering, environmental and energy consulting
- Predecessor: Birdsall Engineering, Inc
- Founded: 1919 in Monmouth County, United States
- Founder: Claude W. Birdsall
- Defunct: June 2013
- Fate: Purchased
- Successor: Partner Engineering and Science, Inc
- Headquarters: Eatontown, USA
- Number of locations: 7 (2010)
- Area served: New Jersey
- Key people: Joseph Derhake
- Total assets: $5.6 million (2013)

Birdsall Services Group (BSG, Birdsall) was an engineering, environmental and energy consulting firm based in Eatontown, New Jersey. Established in 1919, Birdsall provided services to private and public clients throughout the tri-state area, including government agencies, healthcare facilities, developers, industrial and construction managers, architects and attorneys.

In June 2013, most of the assets of the now bankrupt firm were purchased by California-based Partner Engineering and Science, Inc. (Partner), a national environmental and engineering consulting firm focusing on real estate due diligence. BSG is continuing most of its civil engineering, MEP, regulatory compliance and environmental consulting services under the new company name.

== Corporate structure ==
In 1919, Birdsall Engineering, Inc. was founded by Claude W. Birdsall in Monmouth County. The company provided engineering services to public clients including local municipalities, government agencies and public authorities. In subsequent years, Birdsall significantly expanded its services and client markets by acquiring a number of companies that added new capabilities, including: LGA Engineering, Inc. (Land Development) in 1996, Johnson and Associates (MEP) in 1997, DiStasio & Van Buren, Inc. (Structural) in 1999 and John C. Morris Associates in 2001, which Birdsall combined with Johnson and Associates to form Morris, Johnson & Associates, Inc. (Mechanical/Electrical/IT) in 2002. In 2008 Birdsall purchased PMK Group, Inc. (Environmental, Geotechnical, & Energy) and in 2010 acquired select assets of CMX/SCHOOR DEPALMA (Surveying/Water Resources) and CMX NY, Inc.

Initially these firms operated as independent subsidiaries to Birdsall, but in 2010 they were merged to create one cohesive company, known as Birdsall Services Group (BSG). BSG was one of New Jersey's biggest engineering firms, headquartered in Eatontown with seven additional offices in various locations across New Jersey, New York City, and Philadelphia.

== Divisions ==
BSG's key environmental, design and engineering services included:

- Civil Engineering
- Environmental Engineering
- Marine
- Mechanical, Electrical, & Plumbing (MEP)
- Geotechnical Engineering
- Planning
- Structural
- Sustainable Energy
- Transportation
- Waste Management
- Water Resources
- Regulatory Compliance

== Key projects ==
- Pocono International Raceway: Birdsall provided energy and geotechnical consulting services for the Pocono International Raceway, the world's largest solar powered sports facility. BSG worked with NASCAR, Pocono Raceway and photovoltaic specialists at Evolution Energies to develop a 3-megawatt, ground-mounted photovoltaic solar energy system. The 25-acre solar array, which consists of 40,000 photovoltaic modules, is tied into the grid, and provides enough power to operate the entire raceway and 1000 homes nearby. It will produce 72-million kilowatt hours of energy over the next 20 years, enough to offset more than 3100 metric tons of carbon dioxide annually. CNN video created a video video about the Pocono Solar Project.
- NJSE Award: In 2012, BSG received a “Project of the Year” award from the New Jersey society of municipal engineers (NJSME) for its work on the Hawk Rise Wildlife Sanctuary Ecological Walkway and Trailsystem in Linden. The 2012 Honor Place Award in the category of Municipal Projects involving Intergovernmental Cooperation recognized Birdsall's efforts in transforming the former landfill site into the key greenway which serves as an important part of the city.
- Rebuilding Our Backyard: Birdsall was actively involved in post-hurricane Sandy relief efforts, establishing the Rebuilding Our Backyard program to help restore the New Jersey shoreline. Many BSG staff volunteered their time and expertise to help rebuild the Belmar Boardwalk destroyed by the hurricane. At the time Andrew Raichle, former BSG Principal, explained that it was “time to put our coastal and structural experience to use. We need to rebuild our backyard in a responsible manner to make sure we don’t end up here again, because frankly we can’t afford to end up here again”. On November 5, 2012 Birdsall cancelled its annual league party, donating the $35,000 event costs to hurricane relief efforts in the area. BSG was listed on ENR’s Top 200 Environmental Firms at #189 in 2010 and #198 in 2012.

== Pay-to-play scandal ==
In March 2013, seven BSG executives were charged on suspicions of involvement in a scheme to circumvent New Jersey’s so called pay-to-play laws. Prosecutors allege that the executives routinely made – or asked employees to make- illegally reimbursed donations to secure public contracts. By bundling multiple personal political contributions worth less than $300 (which by NJ law do not have to be disclosed) the scheme avoided disqualification under state laws that prohibit public contracts being awarded to firms that have made corporate political contributions to the campaigns of public officials responsible for granting those contracts.

On March 26, 2013, a court order authorized the state Attorney General’s office to freeze Birdsall’s assets, then valued at $41.6 million, prompting the firm to file for Chapter 11 bankruptcy protection. The following month, Birdsall Services Group agreed to pay $2.6 million to settle a civil forfeiture action brought by the attorney general’s office so it could access its bank accounts and pay employees who had temporarily been furloughed. On June 13, the firm pled guilty and was ordered to pay an additional $1m in penalties, fines and institutions. Edwin Stier, who was appointed by a federal bankruptcy judge in April to lead the company, said that “This guilty plea is an acknowledgement on behalf of (Birdsall) of the serious wrongdoing that occurred and accepts the consequences of those actions while still protecting the interests of the innocent employees, clients and creditors”.

Individual cases against the seven executives are pending.

== Acquisition by Partner Engineering and Science ==
On June 5, 2013 the United States Bankruptcy Court approved the sale of most of Birdsall Services Group to Partner Engineering and Science, a national engineering and environmental consulting firm with New Jersey offices in Ramsey and Red Bank. The acquisition was finalized on June 21.

Partner's President Joseph Derhake has said that the company will not engage in any pay-to-play activities. “We have a track record of winning work based solely on the merit of our professionalism and commitment to excellence, and we are confident that we will be successful doing business in New Jersey with integrity. If we can’t win the work based on merit alone, we don’t want that work."

Partner paid $5.6 million for select assets including their accounts receivable, physical assets, select contracts, existing project files, select intellectual property, and license agreements. The activated bankruptcy process protects Partner from any liabilities associated with the pay-to-play case. BSG will continue operating and providing service to its clients largely as previously under the Partner name. The firm has said it will retain as many of Birdsall's staff as possible. The combined firm now has 3 offices in New Jersey, plus 22 more offices across the country providing services including Environmental Due Diligence; Subsurface Investigations and Remediation; Regulatory Compliance; Industrial Hygiene; Building Engineering and Consulting; MEP and Structural Design; Marine and Development and Consulting; Public and Transportation Engineering; Waste Management; Water Resources Management; Construction Risk Management; Energy Efficiency and Sustainable Building Consulting and Design; Land Surveying; and Zoning Reports.
