= Richard Birdsall Rogers =

Canadian civil and mechanical engineer

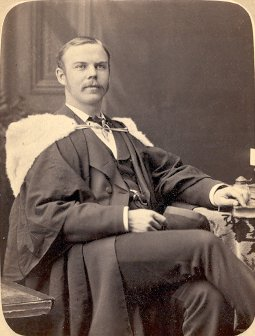
- Richard B. Rogers' McGill University graduation photo, 1878.
- Born: January 15, 1857; Peterborough, Canada West
- Died: October 2, 1927 (aged 70); Peterborough, Ontario, Canada
- Education: McGill University
- Spouse: Mina Rogers
- Engineering career
- Projects: Trent Canal

Richard Birdsall Rogers (15 January 1857 – 2 October 1927) was a Canadian civil and mechanical engineer whose most significant achievement was the design of the Peterborough Lift Lock, a boat lift at Peterborough, Ontario, Canada.

From 1874 to 1878, he studied at McGill College, Montreal, graduating with a degree in civil and mechanical engineering. In 1879, he was appointed a Provincial Land Surveyor and, in 1880, he became Dominion Land Surveyor, a position he retained until 1884 when he entered private practice, taking up the post of Superintending Engineer of the Trent Canal.

In this role, Rogers suggested the use of hydraulic lift locks to the Minister of Railways and Canals, John Haggart, who commissioned him to travel to Europe to study existing boat lifts in France (the Fontinettes boat lift), Belgium (Lifts on the old Canal du Centre) and England (the Anderton Boat Lift near Northwich in Cheshire).

Rogers was the grandson of a noted Provincial Land Surveyor, Richard Birdsall who had surveyed most of the lands in the Peterborough area. Named in his honour are Rogers Cove, a park on Peterborough's Little Lake, and Rogers Street, both of which are close to his lift lock.
