= Harding Icefield =

Ice field in Alaska, United States

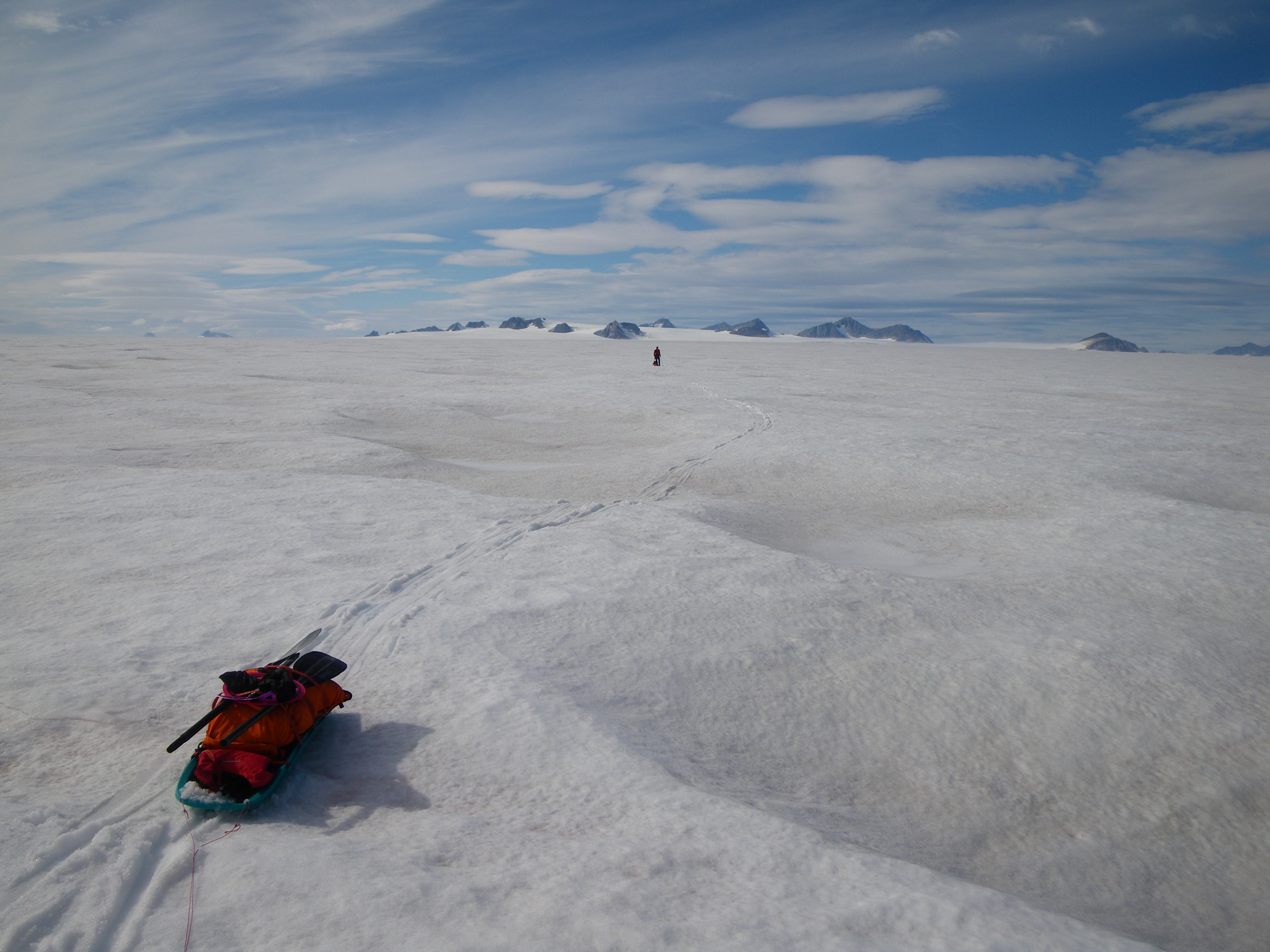
- Harding Icefield between Bear and Skilak Glaciers, Nunatak Plateau in background

- Location within Alaska
- Location: Alaska
- Coordinates: 60°01′05″N 149°59′10″W
- Area: 700 square miles (1,800 km^{2})

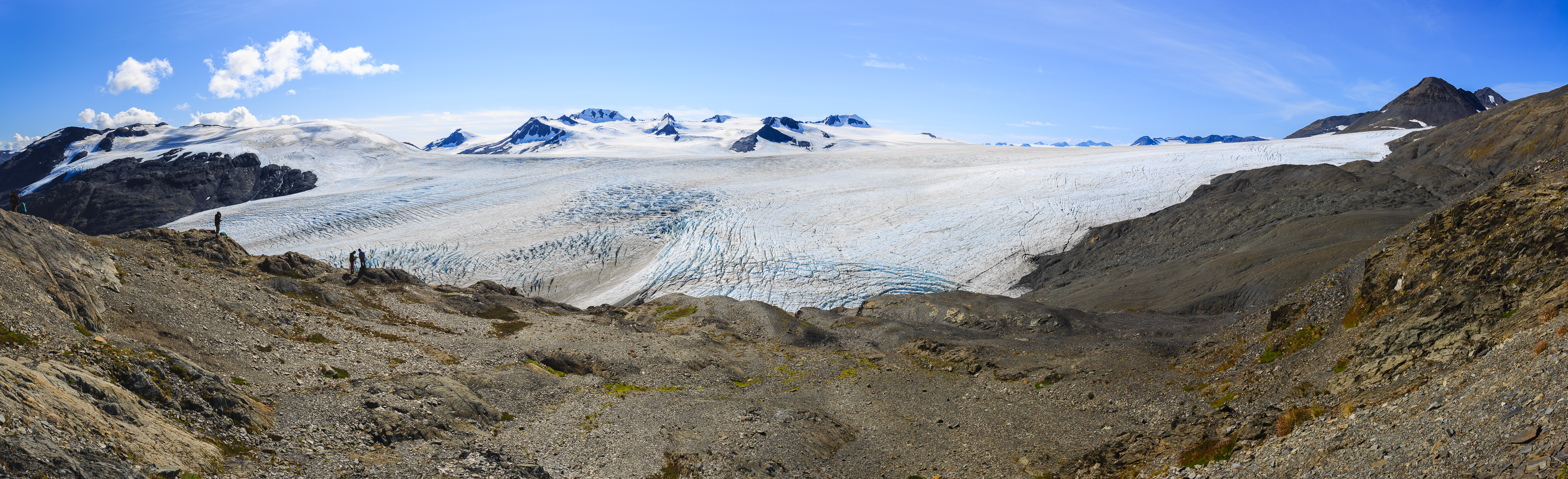
Harding Icefield panorama near Exit Glacier

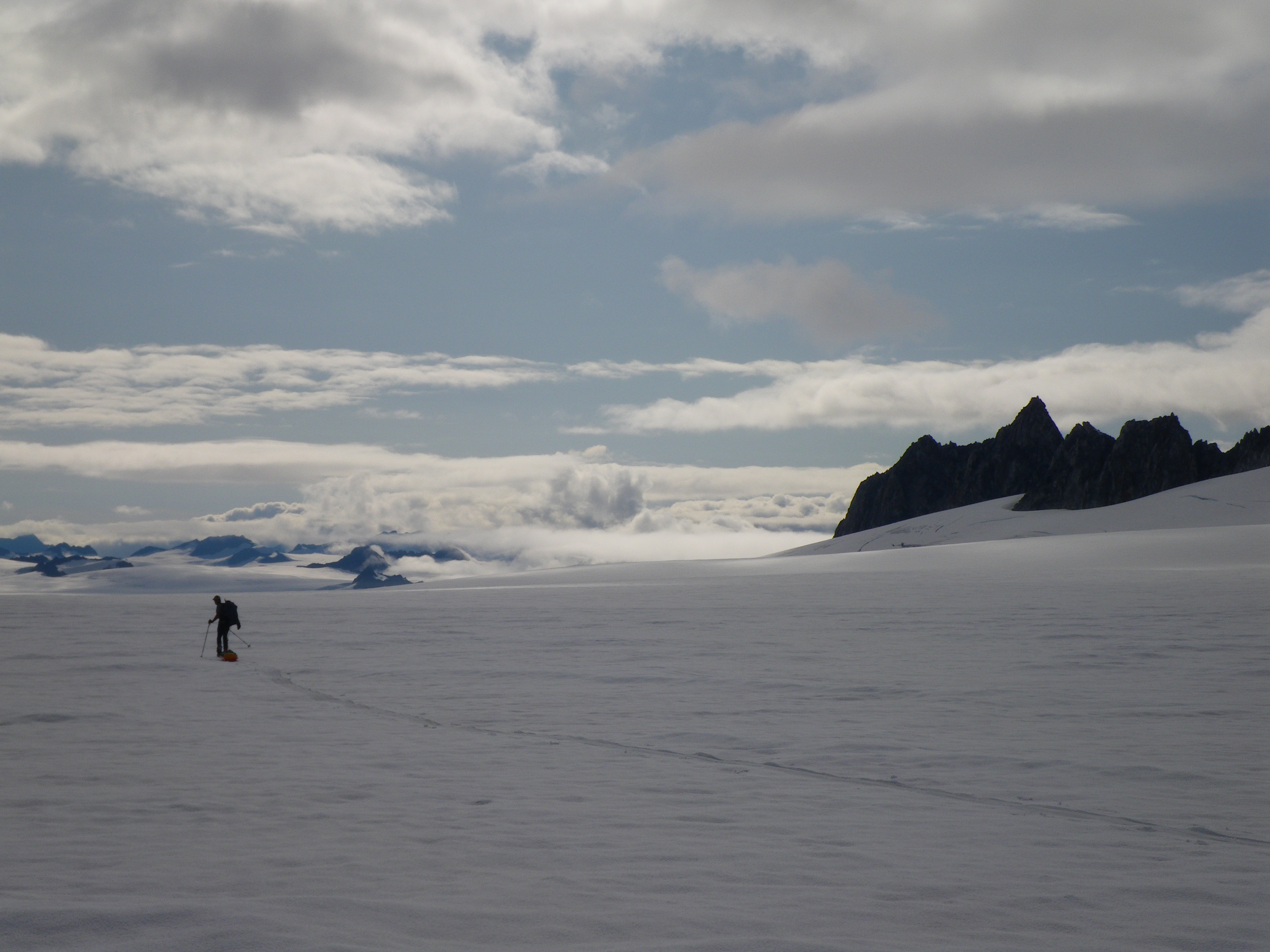
Harding Icefield near Tustumena Glacier

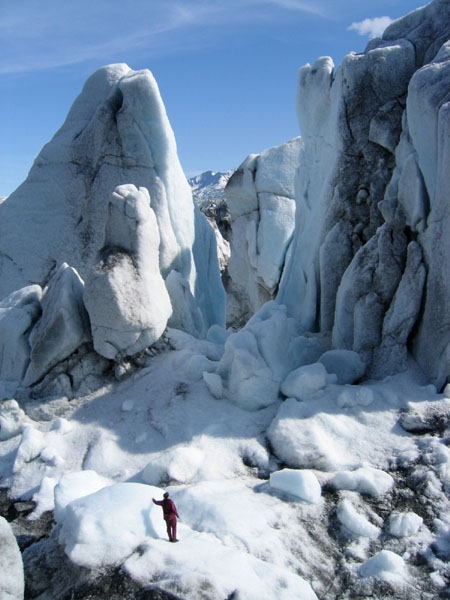
Stranded Icebergs near Harding Icefield

The Harding Icefield is an expansive icefield located in the Kenai Mountains of the Kenai Peninsula in Alaska. It is also partially located in Kenai Fjords National Park. It is named for U.S. President Warren G. Harding.

== Geography ==
The Harding Icefield is over 700 square miles (1,800 km^{2}) in its entirety (although, if one were to count its glaciers which descend from the icefield in all directions, the icefield measures in at over 1,100 square miles (2,800 km^{2})) The icefield spawns up to 40 glaciers of all types. Some of the more notable glaciers include the Tustumena Glacier, Exit Glacier, and McCarty Glacier. The Exit Glacier, however, is the most accessible of the glaciers, being reached by a spur road off of the Seward Highway.

The icefield is also one of four remaining icefields in the United States and is the largest contained entirely within the United States. The icefield itself receives over 400 inches (10 m) of snow each year.

=== Climate ===
There is a Remote Automated Weather Station above Exit Glacier, on the northern end of Harding Icefield. Harding Icefield as a tundra climate (Köppen ET) or an Alpine climate (Köppen ET).

Climate data for Harding Icefield (RAWS), Alaska, 2005–2020 normals: 4200ft (1280m)
Month	Jan	Feb	Mar	Apr	May	Jun	Jul	Aug	Sep	Oct	Nov	Dec	Year
Record high °F (°C)	40 (4)	44 (7)	50 (10)	63 (17)	69 (21)	74 (23)	75 (24)	71 (22)	62 (17)	52 (11)	47 (8)	45 (7)	75 (24)
Mean maximum °F (°C)	32 (0)	34 (1)	36 (2)	45 (7)	57 (14)	60 (16)	62 (17)	59 (15)	49 (9)	41 (5)	33 (1)	33 (1)	66 (19)
Mean daily maximum °F (°C)	19.7 (−6.8)	20.2 (−6.6)	21.2 (−6.0)	28.4 (−2.0)	38.4 (3.6)	44.3 (6.8)	48.2 (9.0)	45.5 (7.5)	39.0 (3.9)	29.5 (−1.4)	20.8 (−6.2)	21.2 (−6.0)	31.4 (−0.3)
Daily mean °F (°C)	16.4 (−8.7)	16.1 (−8.8)	16.5 (−8.6)	23.7 (−4.6)	33.2 (0.7)	39.5 (4.2)	43.9 (6.6)	41.9 (5.5)	36.0 (2.2)	26.5 (−3.1)	17.1 (−8.3)	17.6 (−8.0)	27.4 (−2.6)
Mean daily minimum °F (°C)	12.9 (−10.6)	12.1 (−11.1)	11.8 (−11.2)	18.9 (−7.3)	27.9 (−2.3)	34.7 (1.5)	39.7 (4.3)	38.0 (3.3)	32.8 (0.4)	23.4 (−4.8)	13.4 (−10.3)	14.0 (−10.0)	23.3 (−4.8)
Mean minimum °F (°C)	−8 (−22)	−7 (−22)	−4 (−20)	8 (−13)	19 (−7)	28 (−2)	33 (1)	33 (1)	23 (−5)	9 (−13)	−3 (−19)	−3 (−19)	−13 (−25)
Record low °F (°C)	−21 (−29)	−19 (−28)	−21 (−29)	−9 (−23)	8 (−13)	25 (−4)	30 (−1)	31 (−1)	14 (−10)	1 (−17)	−14 (−26)	−16 (−27)	−21 (−29)
Source: XMACIS2

== History ==
Residents of Seward, Alaska, generally ignored the huge icefield west of town before 1922. The construction of the Spruce Creek trail that year, however, made it possible to view the upper portions of the icecap, and President Harding's promise to visit the territory was sufficient to bestow his name on the feature. Between the mid-1920s and the early 1930s, the increasing popularity of aviation had given a lucky few the opportunity to soar over the icefield. Up to this point, however, settlers had walked only on the icefield's margins.

In early 1936, a 27-year-old Swiss immigrant and future state senator named Yule Kilcher disembarked in Seward. He was headed for Kachemak Bay, where he intended to take up residence, but was so intrigued by the icefield he had seen from the steamship that he vowed to cross it before long. Unwilling to wait two weeks for a coastal steamer, Kilcher walked to the Homer area, probably by way of the Resurrection River valley. After securing a homestead, he returned to Seward, and in late July he hiked up the Lowell Creek drainage toward the icefield. Conditions on the icefield overwhelmed him, however, and a week later he was back in Seward.

About 1940, two Kenai Peninsula residents, Eugene "Coho" Smith and Don Rising, apparently were successful in their attempt to cross the icefield. They hiked from Bear Glacier west to Tustumena Glacier. The men, however, told no one of their intentions, and once they returned, Smith's wife was the only one that was aware of what they had done. Their trip remained a virtual secret for more than twenty years after they completed it.

Two parties attempted to cross the icefield in the mid-1960s. In 1963, a party consisting of Don Stockard, Tom Johnson, and Carl Blomgren tried a westbound crossing. Three years later, J. Vin Hoeman, Dave Johnston, and Dr. Grace Jansen made an eastbound attempt. Both attempts were unsuccessful.

In the spring of 1968, the first documented mountaineering party succeeded in crossing the icefield. Ten people were involved in the crossing, which went from Chernof Glacier east to Exit Glacier. Expedition members included Bill Babcock, Eric Barnes, Bill Fox, Dave Johnston, Yule Kilcher, his son Otto, Dave Spencer, Helmut Tschaffert, and Vin and Grace (Jansen) Hoeman. As noted above, Yule Kilcher, Dave Johnston, Vin Hoeman, and Grace Hoeman were veterans of previous attempts; of the ten, only four—Bill Babcock, Dave Johnston, Yule Kilcher, and Vin Hoeman—hiked all the way across the icefield. The expedition left Homer on April 17, bound for Chernof Glacier; eight days later, they descended Exit Glacier and arrived in Seward. Along the way, the party made the first-ever ascent of Truuli Peak, a 6,612-foot (2,015-meter) eminence that protrudes from the northwestern edge of the icefield near Truuli Glacier.

In 1983, Roman Dial and Jim Lokken skied from the edge of the Skilak Glacier to the Tustumena Glacier edge in a single day, and in 1984, Dial skied from the Skilak to the Chernof solo in one day as part of the Alaska Mountain Wilderness Classic.

== See also ==
- List of glaciers and ice fields
