= Leah Thomas (ecofeminist) =

American environmental justice activist

- Born: December 17, 1994 (age 31)
- Occupation: Environmental activist

Instagram information
- Page: GreenGirlLeah
- Website: www.intersectionalenvironmentalist.com

Leah Thomas, also known as Green Girl Leah, is an American environmental activist active on Instagram whose work focuses on the application of intersectionality to environmental justice. She has been recognized in the 2024 Forbes 30 Under 30 list of notable young professionals.

Thomas grew up in St. Louis, Missouri, 10 minutes from where the shooting of Michael Brown by police happened. She found no one was talking about the intersection of environmental and social injustices, such as the Flint, Michigan water crises where 57% of the population is Black.

She gained notoriety after an Instagram post of hers that used the phrase "intersectional environmentalism" and called for environmental activists to support Black Lives Matter in the wake of the murder of George Floyd.

She runs Intersectional Environmentalist, a website targeted towards people interested in the relationship between the environment and social justice. She is the author of The Intersectional Environmentalist: How to Dismantle Systems of Oppression to Protect People + Planet, which provides advice to environmental activists and describes theories of relationships between race, privilege, social justice, and the environment.

Thomas advocates for climate change activists to adopt anti-racist approaches in order to facilitate an intersectional environmental movement.

In 2025, Thomas was a keynote speaker at Verdical Group's annual Net Zero Conference.

== Education ==
Thomas graduated Chapman University in Orange, California in 2017 with a B.S. in Environmental Science and Policy.
