= Kenai Fjords National Park =

National park in Alaska, United States

- IUCN category II (national park)
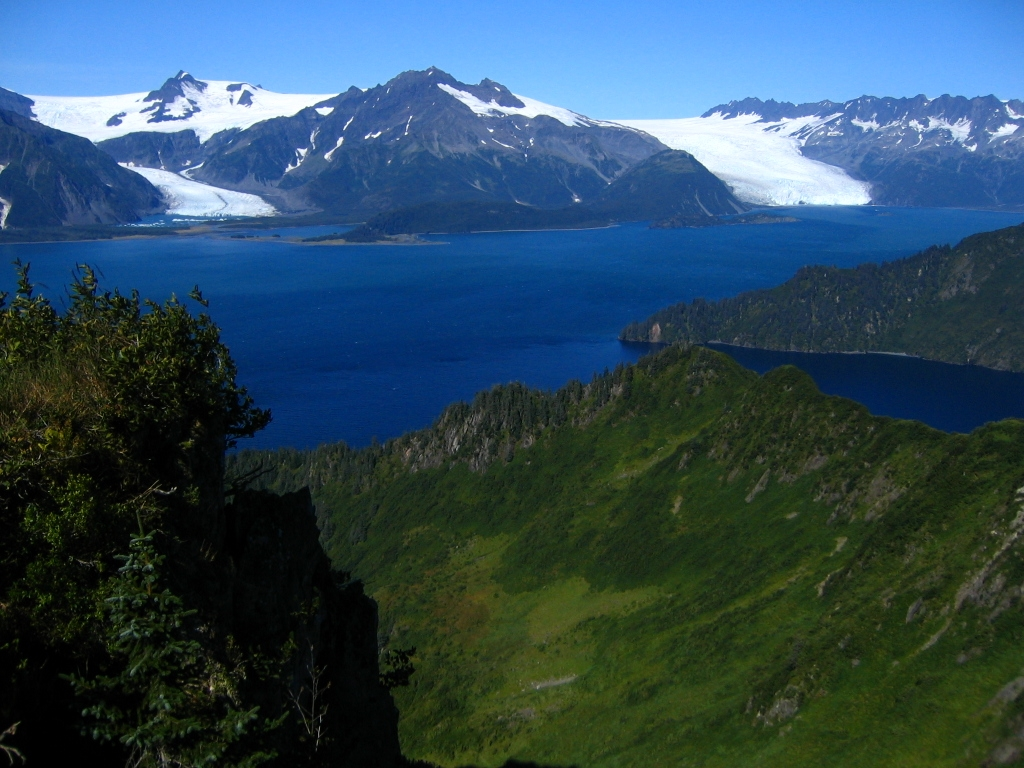
- Kenai Fjords Coastline

- Location within Alaska Location within North America
- Location: Kenai Peninsula Borough, Alaska, United States
- Nearest city: Seward
- Coordinates: 59°55′04″N 149°59′15″W
- Area: 669,984 acres (2,711.33 km^{2})
- Established: December 2, 1980
- Visitors: 425,369 (in 2025)
- Governing body: National Park Service
- Website: nps.gov/kefj

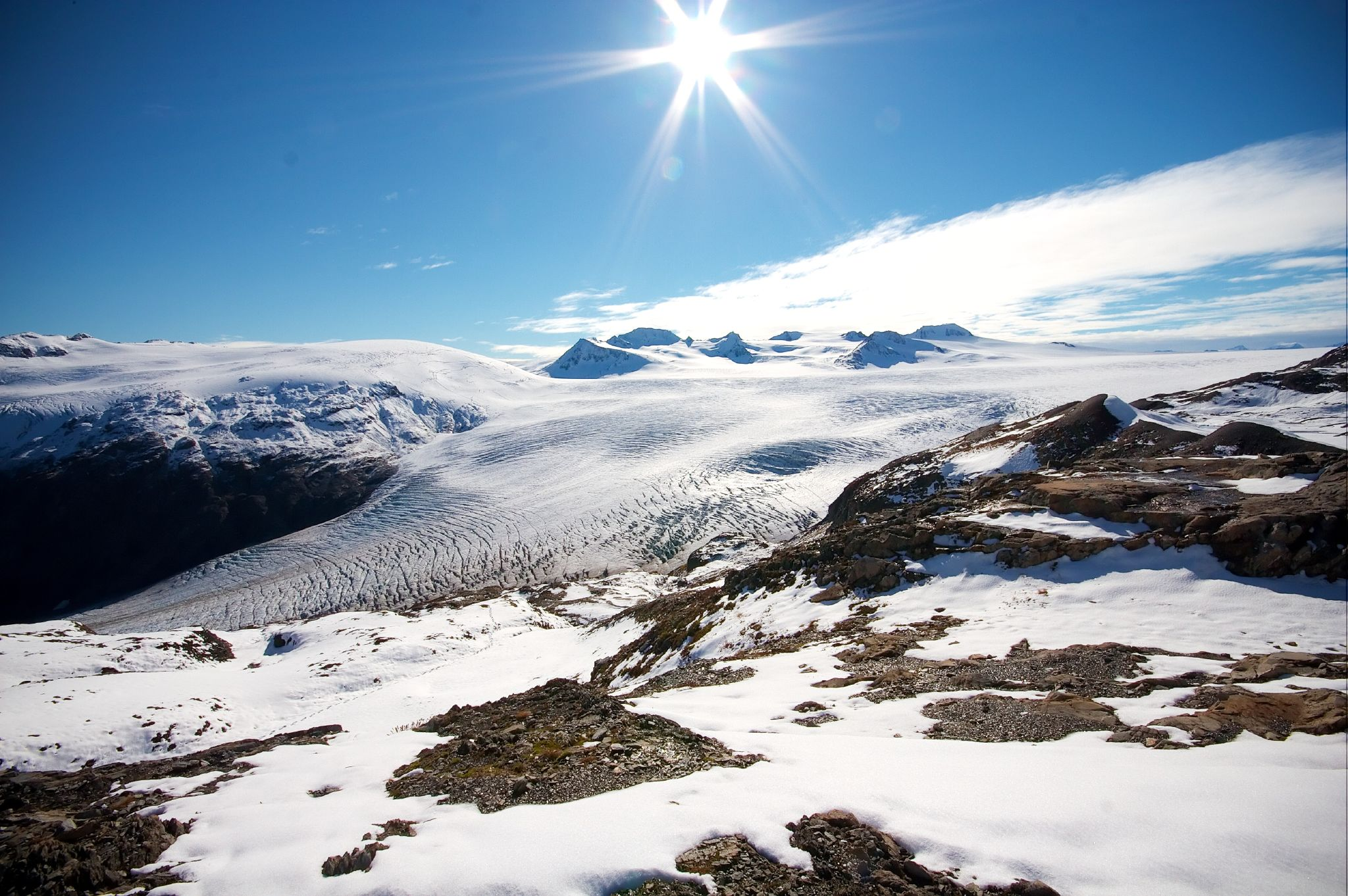
Harding Icefield

Kenai Fjords National Park is a national park of the United States that comprises the Harding Icefield, its outflowing glaciers, and coastal fjords and islands. The park covers an area of 669,984 acres (1,046.9 sq mi; 2,711.3 km^{2}) on the Kenai Peninsula in south-central Alaska, west of the town of Seward.

The park contains the Harding Icefield, one of the largest ice fields in the United States, and is named for the numerous fjords carved by glaciers moving down the mountains from the ice field. The field is the source of at least 38 glaciers, the largest of which is Bear Glacier. The fjords are glacial valleys that have been submerged below sea level by a combination of rising sea levels and land subsidence. Exit Glacier is a popular destination at the end of the park's only road. The remainder of the park is accessible by boat, airplane, and hiking.

Kenai Fjords National Monument was initially designated by President Jimmy Carter on December 1, 1978, using the Antiquities Act, pending final legislation to resolve the allotment of public lands in Alaska. Establishment as a national park followed the passage of the Alaska National Interest Lands Conservation Act in 1980. The park protects the icefield, a narrow fringe of forested land between the mountains and the sea, and the deeply indented coastline. The park is inhabited by a variety of terrestrial and marine mammals, including brown and black bears, moose, sea otters, harbor seals, and humpback and killer whales.

== History ==
Kenai Fjords National Park was established in 1980 by the Alaska National Interest Lands Conservation Act (ANILCA). It is a relatively small and accessible park by Alaskan national park standards, about 88% as big as Yosemite National Park. It is the fifth most-visited park in Alaska, but the 11th of 13 Alaska parks in area, and is the closest national park to Anchorage. The park's headquarters is in Seward. It is the only Alaska national park that did not originally allow subsistence use by Native Americans, but native village corporations continue to have interests in inholdings within the park, and have since established subsistence rights on those properties.

=== Human habitation ===
At the time of the park's establishment, there were few permanent inhabitants. Archeological surveys have altered the early view that the area was subject to only transient occupation as evidence has accumulated of long-term use. It is believed that coastal subsidence and rising water levels have inundated many sites, as the shoreline was the place richest in resources for early peoples. A 1993 Park Service survey documented several village sites dated between 1200 AD and 1920. The survey also found evidence that an earthquake dating to about 1170 AD lowered the shoreline by at least 1.8 metres (5.9 ft), potentially inundating earlier sites. A 2003 follow-up survey indicated that one site was occupied between 950 AD and 1800. Another site was used from 1785 to 1820. A third site showed occupancy from 1850 to 1890.

Several gold mines from historical times have been documented in the park. Mining activity centered on Nuka Bay. Some sites had been active into the 1980s. Eleven mine sites have been documented and two of the mine sites have been determined to be eligible for the National Register of Historic Places.

=== Proposals for a Kenai Fjords park ===
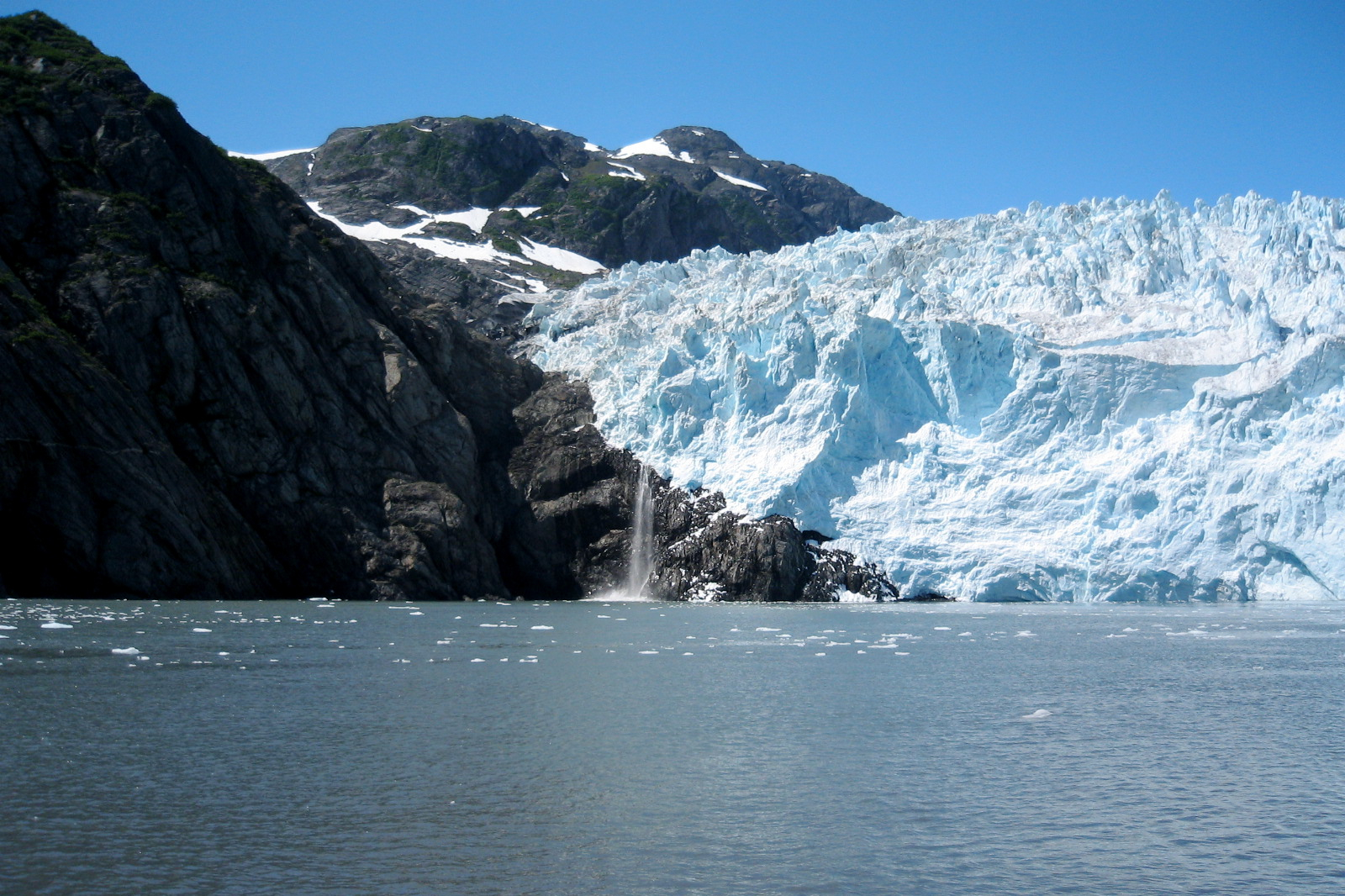
Aialik Glacier

Early studies of possible new Park Service units in Alaska took place in the 1930s and 1940s. The first study, entitled Alaska - Its Resources and Development was centered on the development of tourism, despite a dissent from co-author Bob Marshall, who advocated strict preservation. Another study, funded as part of the Alaska Highway in the 1940s drew similar conclusions to the first study's majority opinion. In 1964 George B. Hartzog Jr., director of the National Park Service, initiated a new study entitled Operation Great Land, advocating the development and promotion of the existing Alaska parks. Follow-up action by Hartzog brought the Park Service into discussions over the Alaska Native Claims Settlement Act (ANCSA). The Kenai Fjords area was not considered to be of the first priority for park designation under the ANCSA.

The earliest proposals for a national park at the Kenai Fjords was raised in the 1970s. In 1971 the Seward National Recreation Area was proposed for the area between the head of Resurrection Bay and Turnagain Arm, extending east to Whittier and west to Exit Glacier. This proposal allowed logging and mining in the area. Although the proposal had support in Congress and from the US Forest Service and the Bureau of Land Management, it was overcome by difficulties with native land claims. Internal Park Service documents envisioned an 800,000-acre (1,250.0 sq mi; 3,237.5 km^{2}) park protecting the coast and the icefield, but this conflicted with the Seward National Recreation Area and a proposed expansion of the Kenai National Moose Range. Another proposal placed the Aialik Peninsula under US Fish and Wildlife Service jurisdiction. On March 15, 1972, four areas of the Kenai Peninsula were set aside under the ANCSA for federal protected areas. The same day the National Park Service formed an Alaska Task Force to study proposed park lands. The Kenai Fjords region was designated Study Area 11. Negotiations between the Park Service, Forest Service, Fish and Wildlife Service and the Chugach Alaska Corporation resulted in a decision by the Department of the Interior to make the Park Service the lead agency for the Kenai Fjords area. In 1973 the Nixon administration proposed the Harding Icefield–Kenai Fjords National Monument as part of the ANILCA legislation. The proposed monument totaled 300,000 acres (468.8 sq mi; 1,214.1 km^{2}) in three areas: the icefield and two island groups.

Legislation stalled in Congress during the Watergate scandal, and was not pursued again until the Carter administration. Secretary of the Interior Cecil D. Andrus proposed a 410,000-acre (640.6 sq mi; 1,659.2 km^{2}) Kenai Fjords National Park. Alaskan opposition to ANILCA prompted President Jimmy Carter to proclaim Kenai Fjords National Monument under the provisions of the Antiquities Act on December 1, 1978, pending final passage of an Alaskan lands bill. No visitor facilities or full-time local management structure resulted from the monument's proclamation. A single ranger was assigned to Seward as a local liaison.

=== National park ===
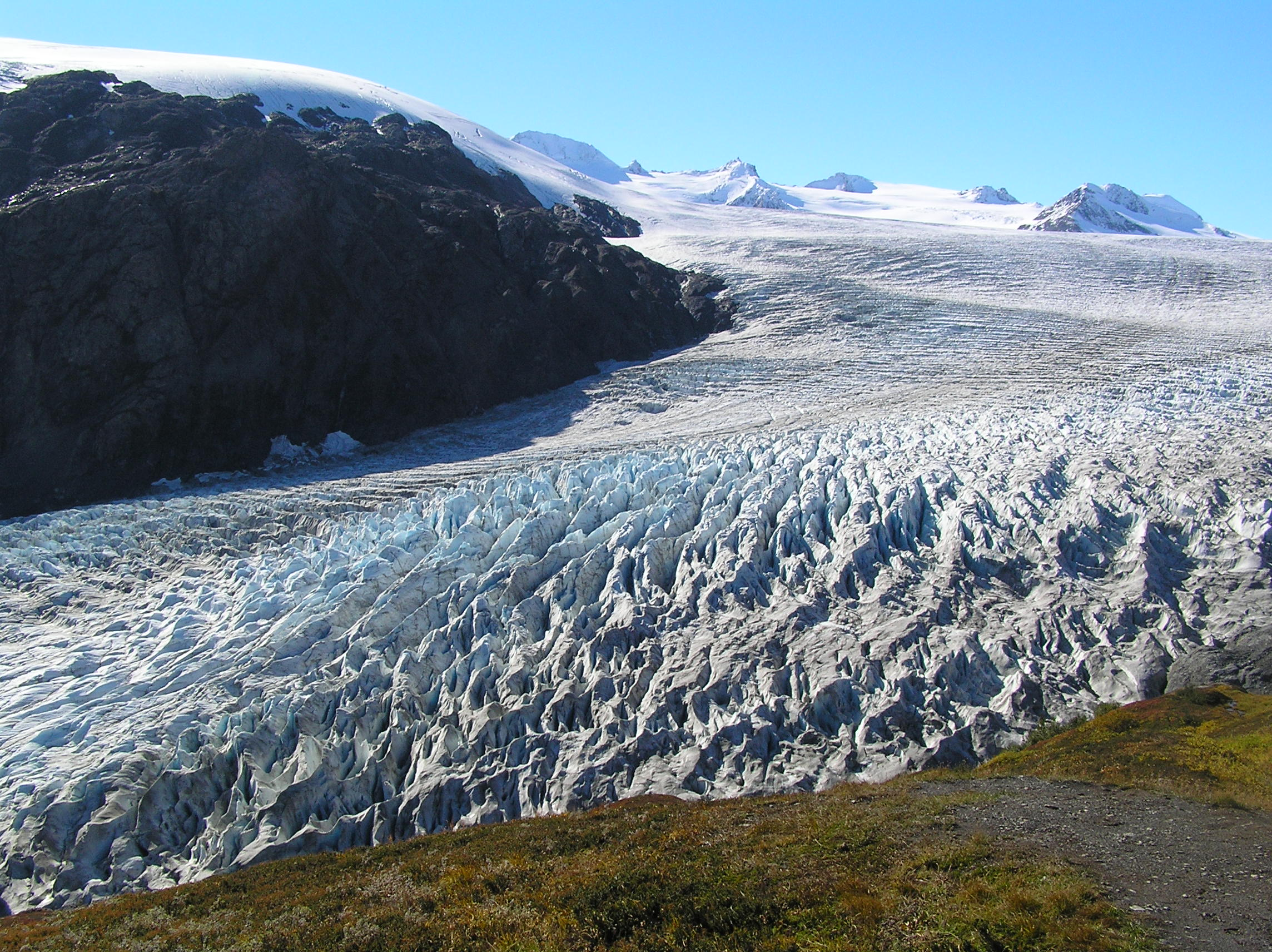
Exit Glacier

On December 2, 1980, the ANILCA bill was signed into law by Jimmy Carter, converting Kenai Fjords to a national park. The first park improvements focused on improving access to Exit Glacier. In 1982, a general management plan for the park was finalized, designating Exit Glacier as "front-country", the fjords as "back-country", and the icefield as wilderness. The park was initially administered by a small cadre of permanent and seasonal rangers and technicians who put considerable emphasis on community liaison.

Under the provisions of ANILCA the park included 119,000 acres (185.9 sq mi; 481.6 km^{2}) of "native selected lands", property that was taken out of federal ownership and conveyed to Alaskan native corporations. Most of the lands claimed were on the coastline. 30,295 acres (47.3 sq mi; 122.6 km^{2}) were repurchased by the Park Service in the 1990s, retaining subsistence rights on about 9,000 acres (14.1 sq mi; 36.4 km^{2}). This altered the original intent of the park to include subsistence claims, previously unrecognized. A lodge was developed by the Port Graham community on Aialik Bay.

=== Activities ===
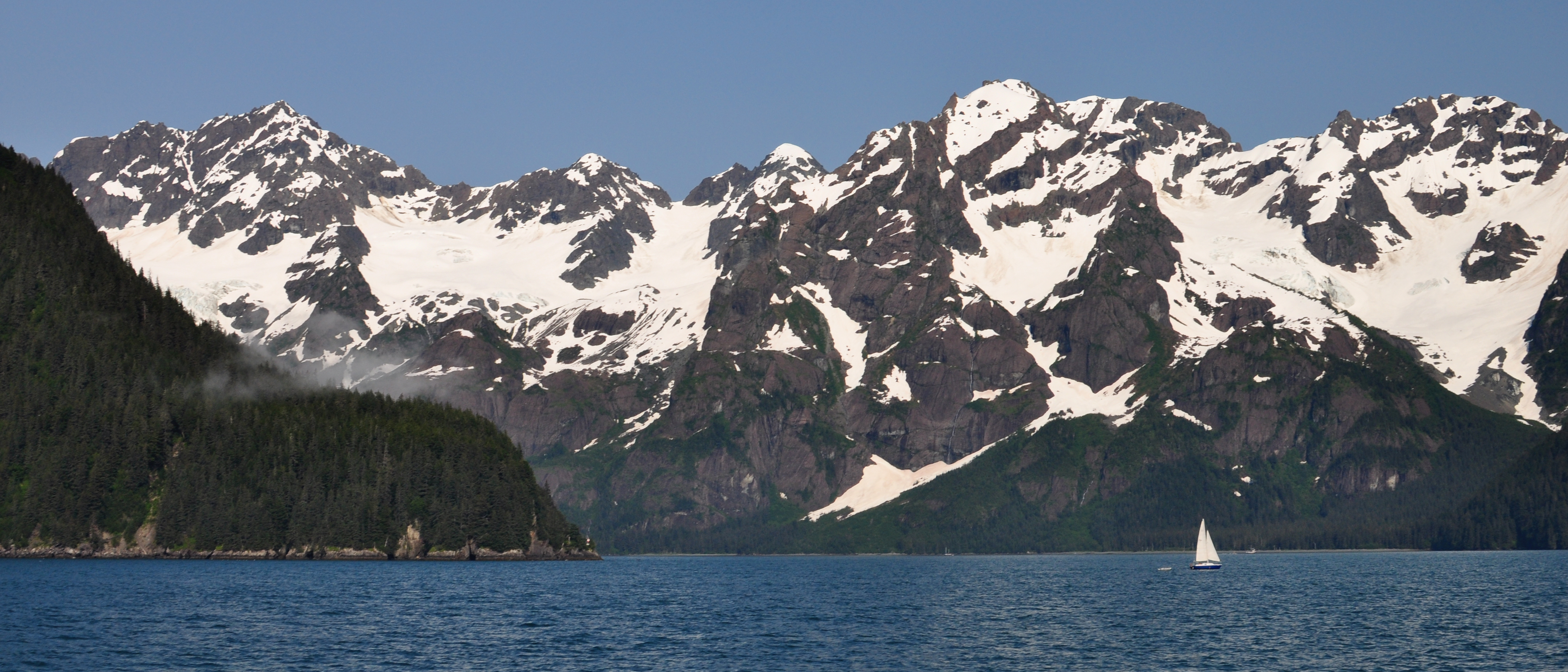
A sailboat near the mouth of Thumb Cove, in Resurrection Bay

Seward is a departure point and destination for large cruise ships from Celebrity Cruises, Carnival Cruise Line, Royal Caribbean International and others. Passenger traffic through Seward is projected at 68,000 for 2013. Cruise tours originating from Seward provide access to the park via Resurrection Bay. Various companies offer tours, many guided by National Park Rangers. The tours provide views of land and marine wildlife, particularly Steller sea lions, puffins, Dall's porpoises, American black bear, snowshoe hares, mountain goats, and humpback and orca whales, as well as natural sights such as the fjords and tidewater glaciers. Seward is a destination for cruise ships. Bus tours from Seward visit Exit Glacier and boat tours visit other parts of the park

The park maintains public-use cabins and shelters in coastal areas and at the edge of the Harding Icefield. Some of these are on native corporation lands, with a portion of the use fee going to the native community.

The park has established a cooperative relationship with the Alaska SeaLife Center, exchanging interpretive services.

== Geography ==
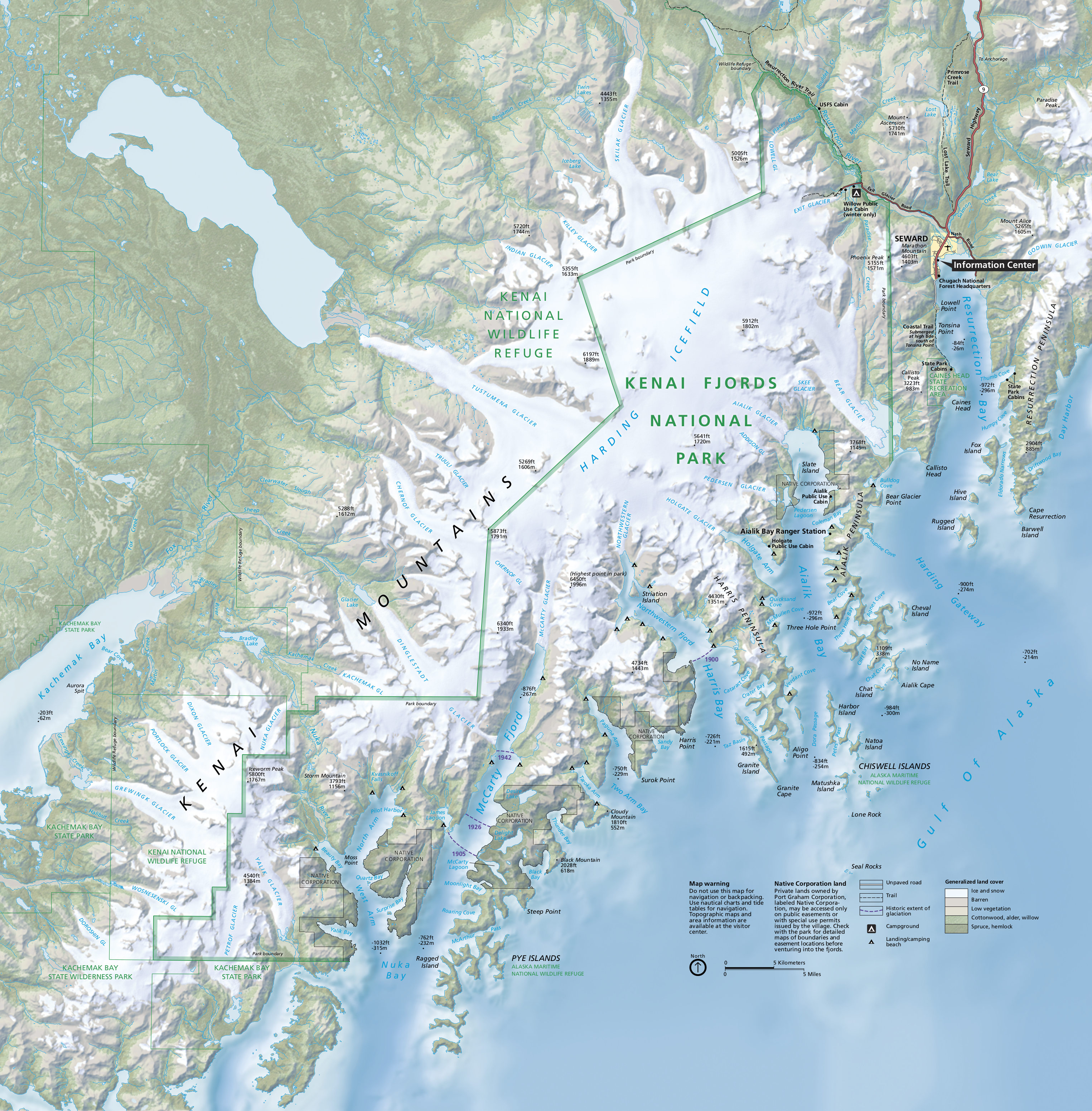
Map of Kenai Fjords National Park

The park lies on the southeastern side of the Kenai Peninsula, about 130 miles (210 km) south of Anchorage. The nearest large town is Seward, immediately to the east of the park on Resurrection Bay. The park includes the region's deeply indented glaciated coastline and its interior icefields. The most significant fjords include Aialik Bay, Harris Bay, McCarty Fjord and Nuka Bay. Much of the interior is covered by the Harding Icefield. The park's highest point is an unnamed peak of 6,450 feet (1,970 m) in the Kenai Mountains. The park is bordered on the west by Kenai National Wildlife Refuge and on the south by Kachemak Bay State Park.

The park can be reached from Seward, 130 mi (210 km) south of Anchorage at the southern terminus of the Seward Highway. It is only one of three national parks in Alaska that can be reached by road, via the Exit Glacier Nature Center. A network of trails from the Nature Center provide access to the glacier, and the 7.4-mile (11.9 km) Harding Icefield Trail.

=== Geology ===
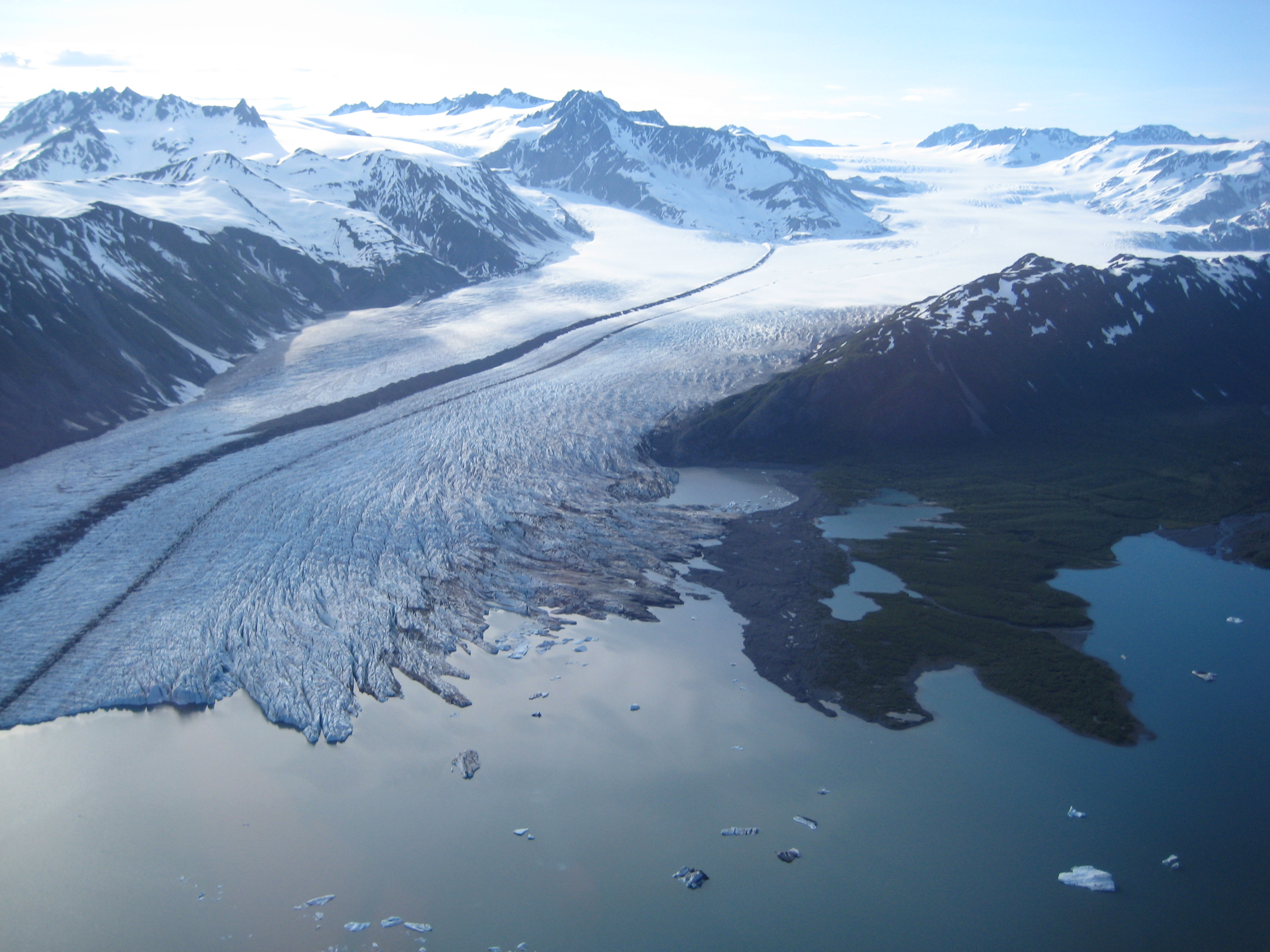
Bear Glacier, the longest glacier in the park

The park's landscape has been shaped by plate tectonics, with the Pacific Plate subducting beneath the North American Plate. The process has lowered the elevation of the Kenai Mountains, gradually pulling glacial features down into the sea, which is at the same time rising. The floors of the fjords can be from 600 to 1,000 feet (180 to 300 m) below the present sea level. The motion of the North Pacific Plate has accreted a variety of terranes against the shoreline, so that the coastal region is a mixture of rocks that originated elsewhere, together with local igneous rock. Predominant rock types include shale and graywacke, with greenstone, tuff and chert.

Kenai Fjords is extensively glaciated, with 51% of the park covered by ice. The Harding Icefield receives 60 feet (18 m) of snowfall per year. More than thirty glaciers originate in the icefield, which first formed about 23,000 years ago. Icefield coverage has declined, with a 3% reduction in coverage over a 16-year study period. The park's largest glacier is Bear Glacier. The most accessible glacier, and the only portion of the park accessible by road, is Exit Glacier.

== Climate ==
According to the Köppen climate classification system, Kenai Fjords National Park has a subarctic climate (Dfc) with cool summers and year-round precipitation. According to the United States Department of Agriculture, the Plant Hardiness zone at Exit Glacier Visitor Center at 463 ft (141 m) elevation is 4b with an average annual extreme minimum temperature of -20.3 °F (-29.1 °C).

Climate data for Seward, Alaska (Seward Airport), 1991–2020 normals, extremes 1997–present
Month	Jan	Feb	Mar	Apr	May	Jun	Jul	Aug	Sep	Oct	Nov	Dec	Year
Record high °F (°C)	61 (16)	50 (10)	57 (14)	74 (23)	80 (27)	88 (31)	87 (31)	86 (30)	76 (24)	62 (17)	54 (12)	52 (11)	88 (31)
Mean maximum °F (°C)	44.6 (7.0)	44.5 (6.9)	47.7 (8.7)	56.3 (13.5)	69.3 (20.7)	74.0 (23.3)	78.1 (25.6)	73.6 (23.1)	67.7 (19.8)	55.6 (13.1)	47.0 (8.3)	44.8 (7.1)	79.9 (26.6)
Mean daily maximum °F (°C)	31.3 (−0.4)	34.3 (1.3)	37.3 (2.9)	45.4 (7.4)	53.4 (11.9)	59.0 (15.0)	62.2 (16.8)	62.0 (16.7)	55.7 (13.2)	45.7 (7.6)	36.1 (2.3)	33.2 (0.7)	46.3 (8.0)
Daily mean °F (°C)	26.2 (−3.2)	28.9 (−1.7)	31.1 (−0.5)	38.8 (3.8)	46.3 (7.9)	52.3 (11.3)	56.2 (13.4)	55.8 (13.2)	49.6 (9.8)	40.2 (4.6)	31.4 (−0.3)	28.2 (−2.1)	40.4 (4.7)
Mean daily minimum °F (°C)	21.1 (−6.1)	23.5 (−4.7)	24.9 (−3.9)	32.2 (0.1)	39.2 (4.0)	45.7 (7.6)	50.2 (10.1)	49.6 (9.8)	43.4 (6.3)	34.7 (1.5)	26.6 (−3.0)	23.2 (−4.9)	34.5 (1.4)
Mean minimum °F (°C)	4.7 (−15.2)	8.1 (−13.3)	11.7 (−11.3)	21.8 (−5.7)	31.2 (−0.4)	37.7 (3.2)	43.3 (6.3)	42.7 (5.9)	34.9 (1.6)	25.7 (−3.5)	14.5 (−9.7)	9.1 (−12.7)	1.6 (−16.9)
Record low °F (°C)	−6 (−21)	−15 (−26)	2 (−17)	10 (−12)	28 (−2)	35 (2)	39 (4)	38 (3)	29 (−2)	15 (−9)	5 (−15)	−1 (−18)	−15 (−26)
Average precipitation inches (mm)	6.47 (164)	6.35 (161)	3.85 (98)	4.29 (109)	3.50 (89)	2.34 (59)	3.11 (79)	5.39 (137)	9.90 (251)	8.69 (221)	7.60 (193)	8.22 (209)	69.71 (1,770)
Average snowfall inches (cm)	12.9 (33)	12.6 (32)	10.5 (27)	3.7 (9.4)	0.3 (0.76)	0.0 (0.0)	0.0 (0.0)	0.0 (0.0)	0.0 (0.0)	0.5 (1.3)	8.2 (21)	15.7 (40)	64.4 (164.46)
Average precipitation days (≥ 0.01 in)	13.6	13.8	12.4	14.2	13.5	11.1	13.4	15.2	17.1	16.6	14.0	15.9	170.8
Average snowy days (≥ 0.1 in)	5.8	5.0	4.7	2.2	0.1	0.0	0.0	0.0	0.0	0.8	3.9	6.7	29.2
Source 1: NOAA (average snowfall/snow days 1981–2010)
Source 2: National Weather Service

== Wildlife and ecology ==
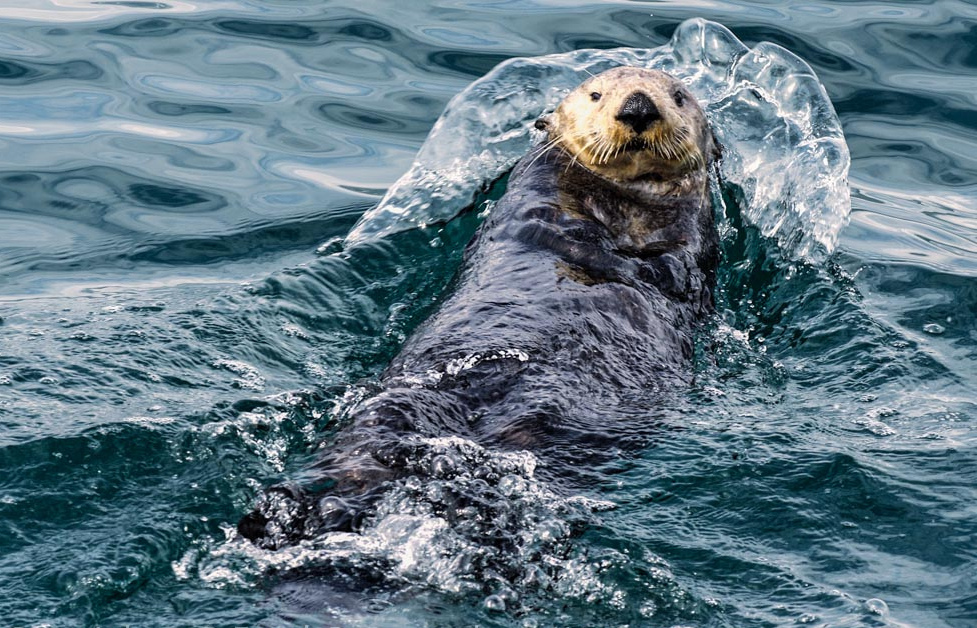
Sea otter, Kenai Fjords

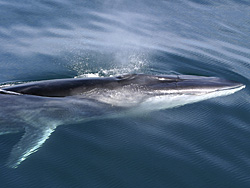
Fin whale in Kenai Fjords

Kenai Fjords National Park is dominated by a glaciated landscape. The park's glaciers have retreated through the twentieth century, exposing new lands to colonization by plant and animal life. The park also features a significant marine environment.

Large terrestrial mammal species in the park include Interior Alaskan wolf, porcupine, Canadian lynx, Alaska peninsula brown bear, black bears, moose and mountain goat. Smaller mammals include coyote, beaver and river otter. Marine mammals include sea otter, harbor seal and Steller sea lion. Cetaceans seen in park waters include orca, fin whale, humpback whale, minke whales, Dall's porpoise and Pacific white-sided dolphin.

Birds that nest in this park include bald eagle, the Peale's subspecies of peregrine falcon, black-billed magpie, and Steller's jay. Marine birds include tufted and horned puffin, common and thick-billed murre, and marbled murrelets.

The plant communities at Kenai Fjords are shaped by glacial retreat. New lands exposed in former glacier beds are at first stony, lacking in soil. The first plants to appear in recently glaciated areas are lichens and mosses, with a few hardy plants such as dwarf fireweed and yellow dryas. These pioneers are followed by other plants as the moss and lichen break rock down into soil. In particular, Sitka alder is capable of fixing nitrogen, supporting itself and enriching the soil. Willows also appear at this stage. Willows and alders are followed by black cottonwoods, then Sitka spruce. The mature forest features Sitka spruce and mountain hemlocks, with an understory of devil's club, Alaska blueberry, elderberry, baneberry, watermelon berry and lady fern in the coniferous forest understory. A similar succession pattern is seen at the park's nunataks, exposed rock outcroppings in the Harding Icefield. Forested portions of the park are dominated by conifers, with deciduous forests confined to areas recently vacated by glaciers.

Harsh conditions at higher altitudes limit tree growth above the tree line, creating an alpine ecosystem. The tree line at Kenai Fjords is between 750 and 1,000 feet (230 and 300 m) above sea level. The alpine regions support shrubby grown to alders, devil's club, elderberry, lady fern, cow parsnip and other plants. Herbaceous plants can grow in areas with better soils, supporting grasses, Nootka lupine, fireweed and other perennial plants. Higher alpine regions support a dwarf shrub community less than 1 foot (30 cm) high, at a very slow rate of growth. Dwarf plants in this region include bog blueberry, partridgefoot, black crowberry and Aleutian mountainheath, all of which are vulnerable to damage from foot traffic.

=== Fjord Estuary Ecosystem ===
Kenai Fjords features an unusual estuary formed from the mix of glacial fresh water and seawater. The erosive power of the glaciers produces sediment as rock flour coloring the waters around the toes of glaciers and carrying minerals into the ecosystem that support phytoplankton, which in turn sustain larger animals.

=== Exxon Valdez oil spill ===
The grounding of the oil tanker Exxon Valdez in Prince William Sound on March 24, 1989, produced extensive contamination of the Kenai Fjords coastline. By early April, Park Service personnel established oil containment boom lines across the mouths of salmon streams and conducted preliminary inventories of plants and animals that might be affected by the oil. The first oil arrived on April 10. In time, about 20 miles (32 km) of coastline was oiled, amounting to about 4% of the total coastline. Headlands were the most affected areas. The oil did not reach the fjords, repelled by heavy spring water flows from the land. Cleanup was difficult, as the oil became a tarry emulsion that could not be skimmed, and had to be dredged. The first season's work stopped in September. Work resumed the next year and continued in 1991. That year Exxon settled with the federal and Alaskan governments, paying about $870 million into a restoration fund, some of which was earmarked for Kenai Fjords.

Archeological sites were also affected by the oil. A beach site near MacArthur Pass was discovered during cleanup operations. The site showed that contrary to earlier beliefs, portions of the park had been used over a long term by native peoples. The site proved to be particularly challenging to clean up without disturbing the area.

== See also ==
- List of birds of Kenai Fjords National Park
- List of national parks of the United States

== Bibliography ==
- Catton, Theodore (2010), A Fragile Beauty: An Administrative History of Kenai Fjords National Park (via the Internet Archive), National Park Service
- Cook, Linda; Norris, Frank (1998), A Stern and Rock-Bound Coast: Kenai Fjords National Park Historic Resource Study (via the Internet Archive), National Park Service
