= Santa Ana Peak =

Mountain in Alaska, United States

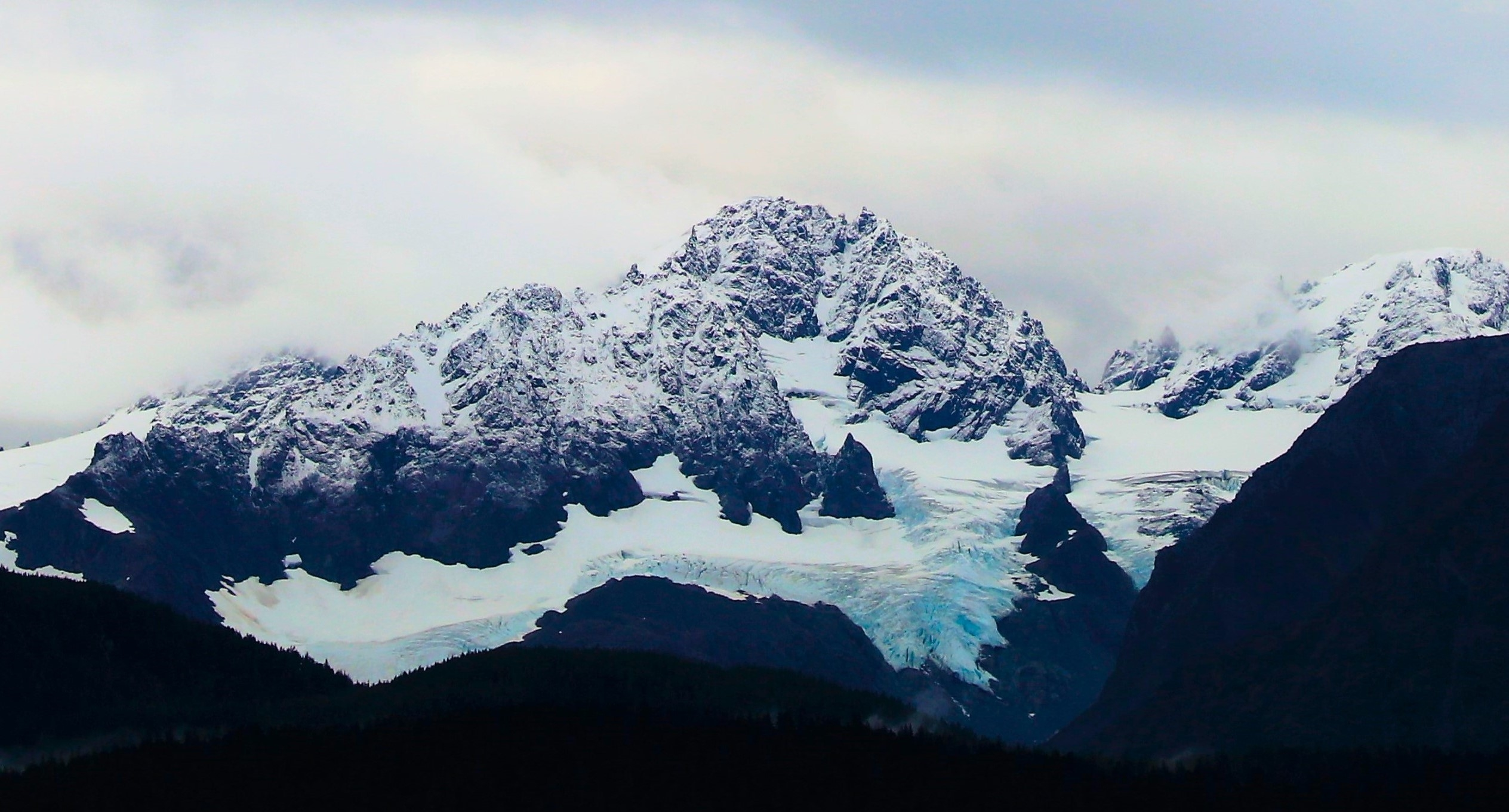
- West aspect

Highest point
- Elevation: 4,764 ft (1,452 m)
- Prominence: 1,004 ft (306 m)
- Parent peak: Peak 4755
- Isolation: 1.61 mi (2.59 km)
- Coordinates: 60°05′02″N 149°12′10″W

Geography
- Location within Alaska
- Interactive map of Santa Ana Peak
- Country: United States
- State: Alaska
- Borough: Kenai Peninsula
- Protected area: Alaska Department of Natural Resources
- Parent range: Kenai Mountains
- Topo map: USGS Seward A-6

Santa Ana Peak is a 4,764-foot-elevation (1,452-meter) mountain summit in Alaska, United States.

== Description ==
Santa Ana Peak is located eight miles (13 km) east of Seward in the Kenai Mountains, on land managed by the Alaska Department of Natural Resources. Precipitation runoff and glacial meltwater from the mountain drains west to Resurrection Bay via Fourth of July Creek and from the east slope to Day Harbor. Topographic relief is significant as the summit rises over 3,700 feet (1,128 m) above the creek in less than two miles (3.2 km) and 4,764 feet (1,452 m) above tidewater of the harbor in four miles (6.4 km). The mountain's toponym was officially adopted June 13, 2019, by the United States Board on Geographic Names. The mountain is named for the wooden steamship Santa Ana which brought Seward's founders to this area in 1903.

== Climate ==
Based on the Köppen climate classification, Santa Ana Peak is located in a tundra climate zone with long, cold, snowy winters, and mild summers. Weather systems coming off the Gulf of Alaska are forced upwards by the Kenai Mountains (orographic lift), causing heavy precipitation in the form of rainfall and snowfall. Winter temperatures can drop below 0 °F with wind chill factors below −10 °F. This climate supports the Godwin Glacier to the north and smaller unnamed glaciers on the slopes of the peak.

== Gallery ==
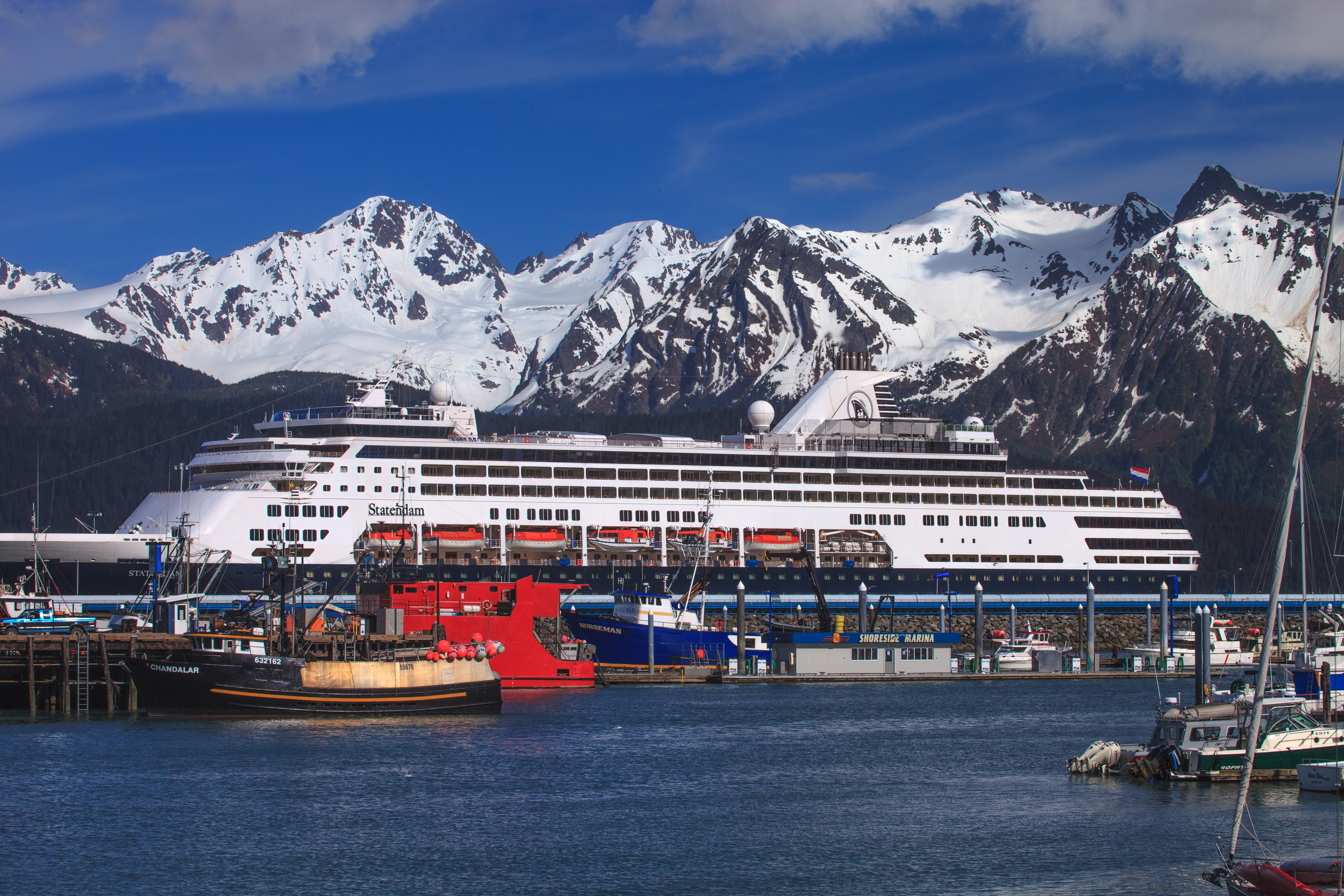
Santa Ana Peak to the left

== See also ==
- List of mountain peaks of Alaska
- Geography of Alaska
