= List of shipwrecks in 1996 =

The list of shipwrecks in 1996 includes ships sunk, foundered, grounded, or otherwise lost during 1996.

table of contents
1996
| Jan | Feb | Mar | Apr |
| May | Jun | Jul | Aug |
| Sep | Oct | Nov | Dec |
Unknown date

== January ==
=== 2 January ===
List of shipwrecks: 2 January 1996
| Ship | State | Description |
|---|---|---|
| Mariscos Express I | Honduras | The offshore supply vessel capsized and sank in the Indian Ocean (24°11′N 92°10′W). Her ten crew were rescued. |

=== 4 January ===
List of shipwrecks: 4 January 1996
| Ship | State | Description |
|---|---|---|
| Bianka Prima | Indonesia | The cargo ship foundered in the Karimata Strait (3°50′S 107°19′E). Nine of her crew were reported missing. |
| Peril Cape | United States | The 44-foot (13.4 m) fishing vessel sank quickly off Sitkalidak Island in the Kodiak Archipelago after her hull failed. The fishing vessel Golden Nugget (United States) rescued her entire crew of three from a life raft. |
| Transmarine | United Arab Emirates | The cargo ship suffered engine damage at Mumbai, India. Declared a constructive total loss, she arrived at Alang, India on 13 March for scrapping. |

=== 6 January ===
List of shipwrecks: 6 January 1996
| Ship | State | Description |
|---|---|---|
| Covasna | Romania | The cargo ship suffered an engine failure in the Atlantic Ocean 200 nautical miles (370 km) north of Portugal (41°36′N 18°05′W). Presumed to have subsequently foundered. |
| Galapagos Explorer | Ecuador | The passenger ship ran aground off Baquizero Moreno, Galapagos Islands. She was a total loss. |

=== 7 January ===
List of shipwrecks: 7 January 1996
| Ship | State | Description |
|---|---|---|
| Kathleen D. | Honduras | The cargo ship foundered in the Gulf of Mexico 150 nautical miles (280 km) west of Tampa, Florida, United States (27°40′N 85°51′W). Her eight crew were reported missing. |

=== 8 January ===
List of shipwrecks: 8 January 1996
| Ship | State | Description |
|---|---|---|
| Camara Pestana | Portugal | The bulk carrier driven ashore at Caniçal, Madeira. She was refloated and towed to Funchal. Declared a constructive total loss, she departed under tow for Lisbon on 25 january for scrapping. |
| Calypso | France | The research vessel was rammed by a barge at Singapore and sank. Refloated on 16 January, repaired and returned to service. |
| Mill Grader | Guyana | The cargo ship foundered 12 nautical miles (22 km) north east of Banma Point, China. |

=== 10 January ===
List of shipwrecks: 10 January 1996
| Ship | State | Description |
|---|---|---|
| Cape Chacon | United States | The 33-foot (10.1 m) fishing vessel ran aground and sank at Ratz Harbor (55°53′15″N 132°35′45″W) off the northeast coast of Prince of Wales Island in the Alexander Archipelago in Southeast Alaska. Her crew of two abandoned ship in a skiff and was rescued by the United States Coast Guard. |
| Kaptan Manolis I | Cyprus | The cargo ship foundered in the Mediterranean Sea off Sicily, Italy (37°22′N 11°00′E). Her thirteen crew were rescued. |

=== 11 January ===
List of shipwrecks: 12 January 1996
| Ship | State | Description |
|---|---|---|
| Sisafino-2 | Russia | The fishing vessel capsized and sank off Sakhalin Island (46°27′N 141°49′E) with the loss of two of her nine crew. Three people were reported missing. |

=== 12 January ===
List of shipwrecks: 12 January 1996
| Ship | State | Description |
|---|---|---|
| Gertrud | Estonia | The cargo ship was driven ashore on Saaremaa. |
| Seeadler-H | Antigua and Barbuda | The cargo ship collided with Scotfield (Flag unknown) and sank in the Baltic Sea (54°45′N 13°31′E). Her four crew were rescued. |

=== 13 January ===
List of shipwrecks: 13 January 1996
| Ship | State | Description |
|---|---|---|
| Tomfield | Bahamas | The cargo ship was driven ashore at the Roche's Point Lighthouse, County Cork, Ireland (51°48′N 8°15′W). Her six crew were rescued. Declared a constructive total loss, she was scapped in situ. |

=== 14 January ===
List of shipwrecks: 14 January 1996
| Ship | State | Description |
|---|---|---|
| Daydreamer | United States | The 39-foot (11.9 m) fishing vessel was wrecked on a reef near Hog Island in Alaska′s Kodiak Archipelago outside of Afognak Bay (58.0499°N 152.7603°W). All four people aboard survived. |
| Recovery III | Panama | The tanker foundered off Coco Solo. |

=== 16 January ===
List of shipwrecks: 16 January 1996
| Ship | State | Description |
|---|---|---|
| Carreira | Spain | The fishing vessel was reported 60 nautical miles (110 km) south west of Penmarc'h, Finistère, France (47°20′N 5°40′W). Presumed foundered; her ten crew were reported missing. |
| Wisselvalligheid | Netherlands | The fishing vessel collided with Baltic Stone (Flag unknown) and sank in the North Sea (52°14′N 3°09′E). Her crew were rescued. |

=== 17 January ===
List of shipwrecks: 17 January 1996
| Ship | State | Description |
|---|---|---|
| Kapitan Shvetsov | Russia | The tanker collided with the container ship Nanta Bhum (Thailand) and sank in the Chao Phraya River, Thailand. Her 28 crew were rescued. She was later refloated and sold for scrapping. |
| Mini Lunar | Greece | The cargo ship was wrecked at Cayo Gorda, Honduras (15°50′N 82°19′W). |

=== 18 January ===
List of shipwrecks: 18 January 1996
| Ship | State | Description |
|---|---|---|
| North Cape | | The tank barge ran aground on Moonstone Beach in South Kingstown, Rhode Island, while under tow by the tugboat Scandia, which also ran aground. |
| Plougasnou | France | The bulk carrier struck a rock and sank off Plougasnou, Finistère (48°43′N 3°48′W). Her crew were rescued. |
| Scandia | | Scandia (foreground) and North Cape (background) aground on 20 January 1996. The tugboat ran aground on Moonstone Beach in South Kingstown, Rhode Island, after her engine room caught fire while she was towing the tank barge North Cape, which also ran aground. |

List of shipwrecks: 19 January 1996
| Ship | State | Description |
|---|---|---|
| Gurita | Indonesia | The ferry ran aground and sank in the Strait of Malacca off Aceh (5°46′N 95°23′E) with the loss of 55 lives; 283 people were reported missing. |

=== 20 January ===
List of shipwrecks: 20 January 1996
| Ship | State | Description |
|---|---|---|
| Avsa | Turkey | The ro-ro ship collided with Volgo-Balt 238 (Russia) off Salıpazarı. She was declared a total loss. |
| Kapitan Luca | Malta | The LPG tanker sprang a leak at Bangkok, Thailand. Declared a constructive total loss, she was sold for scrapping. |

=== 21 January ===
List of shipwrecks: 21 January 1996
| Ship | State | Description |
|---|---|---|
| Yannis | Panama | The cargo ship was abandoned in the Atlantic Ocean (26°17′N 43°53′W). Her crew were rescued. Presumed subsequently foundered. |

=== 23 January ===
List of shipwrecks: 23 January 1996
| Ship | State | Description |
|---|---|---|
| Mainz | Germany | The fishing vessel caught fire at Cuxhaven. She was declared a constructive total loss. |
| Sally J | United States | The 45-foot (13.7 m) salmon seiner burned and sank in Uganik Bay 1 nautical mile (1.9 km; 1.2 mi) off the coast of Kodiak Island, Alaska. |

=== 25 January ===
List of shipwrecks: 25 January 1996
| Ship | State | Description |
|---|---|---|
| Otoyo | Spain | The fishing vessel foundered in the Atlantic Ocean (40°26′N 9°31′W). Her nine crew were rescued. |
| Verkenner I | Namibia | The fishing vessel ran aground and sank in the Atlantic Ocean (25°34′S 13°47′E). |

=== 27 January ===
List of shipwrecks: 27 January 1996
| Ship | State | Description |
|---|---|---|
| Pacesetter | United States | The 114-foot (34.7 m) crab-fishing vessel disappeared in the Bering Sea approximately 65 nautical miles (120 km; 75 mi) north of St. George Island with the loss of her entire crew of seven. |

=== 30 January ===
List of shipwrecks: 30 January 1996
| Ship | State | Description |
|---|---|---|
| Anis Rose | Syria | The cargo ship foundered in the Mediterranean Sea 40 nautical miles (74 km) south east of Olbia, Sardinia, Italy (40°45′N 10°37′E) with the loss of two of her three crew. One person was reported missing. |

=== 31 January ===
List of shipwrecks: 31 January 1996
| Ship | State | Description |
|---|---|---|
| Sealvanamar | Honduras | The cargo ship foundered in the Mediterranean Sea off Famagusta, Cyprus. Her crew were rescued. |

== February ==
=== 3 February ===
List of shipwrecks: 3 February 1996
| Ship | State | Description |
|---|---|---|
| Petani Mistral-5809 | Brunei | The offshore supply vessel collided with the oil rig Trident 12 (Brunei) and foundered. |
| S S Viking | United States | The 55-foot (16.8 m) hatchery vessel struck a rock and sank at Montague Island at the entrance to Prince William Sound on the coast of Alaska. |

=== 5 February ===
List of shipwrecks: 5 February 1996
| Ship | State | Description |
|---|---|---|
| Rico | Malaysia | The cargo ship sprang a leak and sank 1 nautical mile (1.9 km) off the Tanjung Gelang Lighthouse. Her 23 crew were rescued. |

=== 6 February ===
List of shipwrecks: 6 February 1996
| Ship | State | Description |
|---|---|---|
| Capt. Gil | United States | The tug sprang a leak and sank in the Gulf of Mexico off Steinhatchee, Florida. |
| L'Ebauche | Belgium | The fishing vessel sank in the Atlantic Ocean (50°44′N 6°06′W). Her four crew were rescued. |
| Sibel S. | Turkey | The cargo ship ran aground in the Dardanelles. She was refloated on 2 April. Declared a constructive total loss, she arrived at Aliağa on 3 June for scrapping. |

=== 7 February ===
List of shipwrecks: 7 February 1996
| Ship | State | Description |
|---|---|---|
| Ambition | United States | The 83-foot (25.3 m) fishing trawler sank in Unimak Pass in the Aleutian Islands (54°24′N 165°36′W). Her crew of five abandoned ship wearing survival suits and was rescued by the fishing vessel Lone Star (United States). |

=== 8 February ===
List of shipwrecks: 8 February 1996
| Ship | State | Description |
|---|---|---|
| Daadgar | Iran | The cargo ship foundered inn the Red Sea off Ras Al Khaimah, United Arab Emirates. Three of her seven crew were rescued, the rest were reported missing. |

=== 9 February ===
List of shipwrecks: 9 February 1996
| Ship | State | Description |
|---|---|---|
| Innovator | Saint Vincent and the Grenadines | The bulk carrier foundered 25 nautical miles (46 km) south of Hainan Island, China (18°08′N 108°33′E). Her 24 crew were rescued. |
| Sunny Breeze | Panama | The tanker caught fire and exploded off Cheju Island, South Korea. She was scuttled approximately 120 nautical miles (220 km) off Fukue Island, Japan on 18 February. |

=== 11 February ===
List of shipwrecks: 11 February 1996
| Ship | State | Description |
|---|---|---|
| Helena Jayne | United Kingdom | The cargo ship capsized and sank 28 nautical miles (52 km) north of "Ist Boca". |

=== 12 February ===
List of shipwrecks: 12 February 1996
| Ship | State | Description |
|---|---|---|
| Al Johffa | Panama | The cargo ship was driven onto rocks in the Bay of Santos. Declared a constructive total loss, she was refloated, towed out to sea, and scuttled. |

=== 13 February ===
List of shipwrecks: 13 February 1996
| Ship | State | Description |
|---|---|---|
| Flipper | Spain | The fishing vessel sprang a leak and foundered in the Atlantic Ocean (17°10′N 16°42′W). Her eigteen crew were rescued. |
| Novoyeniseysk | Russia | The fishing vessel caught fire at Korsakov and was beached. Declared a constructive total loss, she was subsequently scrapped at Alang, India. |

=== 15 February ===
List of shipwrecks: 15 February 1996
| Ship | State | Description |
|---|---|---|
| Pan | Malta | The cargo ship ran aground off Gibraltar (36°16′N 5°16′W). She was later refloated and taken in to Algecíras, Spain. Declared a constructive total loss, she was consequently scrapped. |
| Sea Empress | Liberia | Sea Empress oil spill: The tanker ran aground on rocks at the entrance to the Cleddau Estuary near Milford Haven, Dyfed loaded with 130,000 tonnes of crude oil. Later repaired and returned to service. |

=== 17 February ===
List of shipwrecks: 19 February 1996
| Ship | State | Description |
|---|---|---|
| Seafaith | Malta | The bulk carrier foundered in the East China Sea 60 nautical miles (110 km) north of Taiwan (26°03′N 122°51′E). Eleven of her 30 crew were rescued, the rest were reported missing. |

=== 18 February ===
List of shipwrecks: 18 February 1996
| Ship | State | Description |
|---|---|---|
| Romy | Belize | The cargo ship foundered in the Caribbean Sea (15°16′N 74°26′W). |

=== 19 February ===
List of shipwrecks: 19 February 1996
| Ship | State | Description |
|---|---|---|
| Aegeon | Greece | The ro-ro ship caught fire at Drapetzona. She was towed to Atalanti Island, where she capsized and sank. |
| Gretchen I | Philippines | The overloaded ferry capsized and sank off Cadiz with the loss of 71 lives. There were at least 141 survivors. |
| Gu Cheng | Chin | The container ship foundered 50 nautical miles (93 km) west of Tamsui (25°30′N 120°30′E). Her 30 crew were reported missing. |

=== 20 February ===
List of shipwrecks: 20 February 1996
| Ship | State | Description |
|---|---|---|
| Ocean Ruby | Panama | The cargo ship capsized and sank off Cape Bojeador, Philippines (18°20′N 120°10′E). Two of her eighteen crew were reported missing. |

=== 25 February ===
List of shipwrecks: 25 February 1996
| Ship | State | Description |
|---|---|---|
| Loussio | Panama | The bulk carrier ran aground off Jeddah, Saudi Arabia. She was refloated the next day and taken in to Jeddah. Declared a constructive total loss, she arrived at Chittagong on 6 Aprul for scrapping. |
| Tatsu Maru No.2 | Japan | The bulk carrier collided with the tanker Torinitsa (Bahamas) off Ikata. She sank the next day (approximately 33°36′N 132°19′E). |

=== 27 February ===
List of shipwrecks: 27 February 1996
| Ship | State | Description |
|---|---|---|
| Michael DePalma | United States | The retired 70-foot (21.3 m) barge was scuttled as an artificial reef in the North Atlantic Ocean off Wildwood, New Jersey, at 38°56.970′N 074°41.337′W. |
| Nuovo Ngiolo | Italy | The fishing vessel fonundered in the Mediterranean Sea south of Lampedusa. |
| Yom Bun Jin | North Korea | The cargo ship foundered 190 nautical miles (350 km) off Hungnam (38°45′N 131°21′E) with the loss of two of her 37 crew. Thirty-three people were reported missing. |

=== 29 February ===
List of shipwrecks: 29 February 1996
| Ship | State | Description |
|---|---|---|
| All American | United States | All American in 1996. The 289-gross ton, 147.6-foot (45.0 m) crab-fishing vessel was wrecked on the north coast of St. George Island in the Bering Sea. A Eurocopter HH-65 Dolphin helicopter from the high endurance cutter USCGC Sherman ( United States Coast Guard) rescued her entire crew of five. Plans called for her wreck to be refloated, towed out to sea, and scuttled. |
| B. Onal | Turkey | The cargo ship caught fire in Delaware Bay. She was escorted in to Wilmington, Delaware, United States. The fire was extinguished. Declared a constructive total loss, she arrived at Alang, India on 15 November for scrapping. |

== March ==
=== 2 March ===
List of shipwrecks: 2 March 1996
| Ship | State | Description |
|---|---|---|
| Nedlloyd Recife | Liberia | The container ship ran aground off São Francisco do Sul, Brazil (26°11′S 48°29′W). She was scrapped in situ. |

=== 5 March ===
List of shipwrecks: 5 March 1996
| Ship | State | Description |
|---|---|---|
| Spirit of Cape Town | Panama | The container ship capsized and sank at Cape Town, South Africa. She was refloated on 5 November. Declared a constructive total loss, she was towed to Saldanha Bay for scrapping. |

=== 14 March ===
List of shipwrecks: 14 March 1996
| Ship | State | Description |
|---|---|---|
| Shamrock Uno | Panama | The tanker collided with the tanker Colmar (France) and sank in the South China Sea (25°50′N 120°40′E). Her sixteen crew were rescued. |

=== 19 March ===
List of shipwrecks: 19 March 1996
| Ship | State | Description |
|---|---|---|
| Cheng Da | China | The cargo ship foundered in the Taiwan Strait (24°42′N 119°44′E. Nine of her 24 crew were resuced, the rest were reported missing. |

=== 21 March ===
List of shipwrecks: 21 March 1996
| Ship | State | Description |
|---|---|---|
| Delta Linda | United States | The tug foundered in the Pacific Ocean 25 nautical miles (46 km) west of the Golden Gate Channel. Her five cre were rescued. |

=== 22 March ===
List of shipwrecks: 22 March 1996
| Ship | State | Description |
|---|---|---|
| Super Orient | Belize | The bulk carrier foundered off Tsushima, Japan with the loss of four of her seven crew. |

=== 23 March ===
List of shipwrecks: 23 March 1996
| Ship | State | Description |
|---|---|---|
| Jep | France | The fishing vessel foundered. She was being towed from Japan to South Korea. |

=== 25 March ===
List of shipwrecks: 25 March 1996
| Ship | State | Description |
|---|---|---|
| Bom Re | Portugal | The dredger foundered south west of Madeira (32°40′N 17°07′W) with the loss of one of her seven crew. |

=== 27 March ===
List of shipwrecks: 27 March 1996
| Ship | State | Description |
|---|---|---|
| David Junior | Philippines | The cargo ship foundered in Lianga Bay. Six people were reported missing. |

=== 29 March ===
List of shipwrecks: 29 March 1996
| Ship | State | Description |
|---|---|---|
| Evelyn Mary Louise | United States | The 32-foot (9.8 m) fishing vessel burned and sank without loss of life at Metlakatla, Alaska. |

=== 30 March ===
List of shipwrecks: 30 March 1996
| Ship | State | Description |
|---|---|---|
| Anna Bliss | Panama | The cargo ship foundered in the Atlantic Ocean off Cabedelo, Brazil. Her crew were rescued. |
| SLNS P-458 | Sri Lanka Navy | Sri Lankan Civil War: The P-453 (Dvora-class) patrol boat was sunk by the Liberation Tigers of Tamil Eelam with an explosive motorboat. |

== April ==
=== 3 April ===
List of shipwrecks: 3 April 1996
| Ship | State | Description |
|---|---|---|
| Mitsu Maru | Japan | The cargo ship collided with the tanker Kosei Maru No.8 (Japan) and sank 11 nautical miles (20 km) south west of Lake Hamana. Her crew were rescued. |

=== 4 April ===
List of shipwrecks: 4 April 1996
| Ship | State | Description |
|---|---|---|
| Desiree C | United States | The 38-foot (11.6 m) fishing vessel capsized and was lost in 25-foot (7.6 m) seas in Chiniak Bay (57°42′N 152°20′W) off Kodiak Island in Alaska′s Kodiak Archipelago. The two men aboard lost their lives. |

=== 9 April ===
List of shipwrecks: 9 April 1996
| Ship | State | Description |
|---|---|---|
| Ever Trust | Panama | The container ship caught fire at Osaka, Japan. She was subsequently towed to Kobe. Declared a constructive total loss, she departed under tow for Guangzhou, China on 28 September for scrapping. |

=== 13 April ===
List of shipwrecks: 13 April 1996
| Ship | State | Description |
|---|---|---|
| Harran | Turkey | The cargo ship was abandoned in the South China Sea (11°52′N 114°19′E). Her 26 crew were rescued. Presumed to have subsequently foundered. |

=== 15 April ===
List of shipwrecks: 15 April 1996
| Ship | State | Description |
|---|---|---|
| Duchess | United States | The 142-gross ton, 79-foot (24.1 m) fishing vessel caught fire off Spruce Island near Spruce Cape (57°55′N 152°25′W) in Alaska′s Kodiak Archipelago. After a United States Coast Guard helicopter lifted off her crew of three, the tug Chenaille Rouge (United States) took her under tow, but Duchess capsized and the towline parted. Duchess′s wreck washed ashore on Spruce Island on 17 April. She was deemed a total loss. |

=== 16 April ===
List of shipwrecks: 16 April 1996
| Ship | State | Description |
|---|---|---|
| Pauline Pearl | United States | The fishing vessel capsized and sank in the Atlantic Ocean (42°28′N 69°07′W). Her three crew were rescued. |

=== 19 April ===
List of shipwrecks: 19 April 1996
| Ship | State | Description |
|---|---|---|
| Antares | United States | The retired 41-foot (12.5 m) steel-hulled sailboat was scuttled as an artificial reef in the North Atlantic Ocean 3.1 nautical miles (5.7 km; 3.6 mi) off Barnegat, New Jersey, at 39°45.067′N 074°01.892′W. |
| Hope | Belize | The cargo ship collided with Do Nam No.6 (South Korea) and sank 2.5 nautical miles (4.6 km) east of "Bughyeongji Do" (34°54′N 129°00′E). Her crew were rescued. |

=== 24 April ===
List of shipwrecks: 24 April 1996
| Ship | State | Description |
|---|---|---|
| D'Artagnan II | France | The fishing vessel collided with Frio Marathon (Bahamas) and sank in the English Channel 6.5 nautical miles (12.0 km) north of Cap Griz Nez, Pas-de-Calais. Her five crew were rescued. |

=== Unknown date ===
List of shipwrecks: Unknown date in April 1996
| Ship | State | Description |
|---|---|---|
| Sandgrepstur | Faroe Islands | The cargo ship foundered off the Faroe Islands. |

== May ==
=== 8 May ===
List of shipwrecks: 8 May 1996
| Ship | State | Description |
|---|---|---|
| Hosei Maru No.499 | Japan | The cargo ship was driven ashore on the east coast of Niijima. |
| Poisson I | Morocco | The fishing vessel caught fire and sank off the coast of Morocco. Her crew survived. |

=== 11 May ===
List of shipwrecks: 11 May 1996
| Ship | State | Description |
|---|---|---|
| Pallada | Russia | The cargo ship capsized and sank at Vladivostok. Her 23 crew survived. |

=== 12 May ===
List of shipwrecks: 12 May 1996
| Ship | State | Description |
|---|---|---|
| Saronic Trader | Bahamas | The container ship caught fire in the South China Sea (15°41′N 115°22′E). She was towed in to Manila, Philippines on 7 June. Declared a constructive total loss, she departed under tow for Alang, India on 21 June for scrapping. |

=== 13 May ===
List of shipwrecks: 13 May 1996
| Ship | State | Description |
|---|---|---|
| C. Express | Thailand | The cargo ship was a total loss. |

=== 14 May ===
List of shipwrecks: 14 May 1996
| Ship | State | Description |
|---|---|---|
| Solar Wind | Flag unknown | The trimaran and its two-person crew were reported missing after encountering a tropical storm. |

=== 21 May ===
List of shipwrecks: 21 May 1996
| Ship | State | Description |
|---|---|---|
| Bukoba | Tanzania | The passenger vessel sank in Lake Victoria, drowning some 800 people. |

=== 25 May ===
List of shipwrecks: 25 May 1996
| Ship | State | Description |
|---|---|---|
| Ruby | United States | The 34-foot (10.4 m) fishing vessel was destroyed by fire in Tongass Narrows in Southeast Alaska without loss of life. |

=== 28 May ===
List of shipwrecks: 28 May 1996
| Ship | State | Description |
|---|---|---|
| Agios Nikolaos I | Greece | The tanker was damaged by fire at the Lavera Refinery, Bouches-du-Rhône, France with the loss of one life. The fire was extinguished. Declared a constructive total loss, she departed under tow for Piraeus, Greece on 19 July. Subsequently used as a hulk. |

=== 31 May ===
List of shipwrecks: 31 May 1996
| Ship | State | Description |
|---|---|---|
| Atlantis I | Argentina | The fishing vessel caught fire and sank north of the Falkland Islands. |
| Leone | Panama | The fishing vessel caught fire in the Barents Sea. Declared a constructive total loss, she was towed to Viana do Castelo, Spain, where she arrived on 22 June for scrapping. |

=== Unknown date ===
List of shipwrecks: Unknown date in May 1996
| Ship | State | Description |
|---|---|---|
| Rossomakha | Russia | The fishing vessel foundered off the east coast of the Kamchatka Peninsula. |

== June ==
=== 2 June ===
List of shipwrecks: 2 June 1996
| Ship | State | Description |
|---|---|---|
| Heikyu Maru No.35 | Japan | The fishing vessel collided with Hokubei Maru No.37 (Japan) and sank in the Sea of Japan (43°33′N 140°52′E). |

=== 3 June ===
List of shipwrecks: 3 June 1996
| Ship | State | Description |
|---|---|---|
| Kaifuku Maru | Japan | The cargo ship collided with Maju Jaya (Japan) and sank off Inubosaki. |
| Okavango | Belize | The cargo ship capsized and sank in the Atlantic Ocean (17°02′N 62°32′W). |

=== 4 June ===
List of shipwrecks: 4 June 1996
| Ship | State | Description |
|---|---|---|
| Marjo | United States | The 48-foot (14.6 m) vessel was destroyed by fire in Salisbury Sound in the Alexander Archipelago in Southeast Alaska. |

=== 10 June ===
List of shipwrecks: 11 June 1996
| Ship | State | Description |
|---|---|---|
| Berbera I | (Somalia) Somali Republic | The research vessel collided with a yacht and sank off the coast of Oman. Two of her fourteen crew were resced, the rest were reported missing. |
| Procida | Italy | The passenger ship struck a reef, capsized and sank off Procida with the loss of four lives. |

=== 11 June ===
List of shipwrecks: 11 June 1996
| Ship | State | Description |
|---|---|---|
| SLNS P-232 | Sri Lanka Navy | Sri Lankan Civil War: The patrol boat was sunk by Liberation Tigers of Tamil Eelam mines. |
| SLNS P-243 | Sri Lanka Navy | Sri Lankan Civil War: The patrol boat was sunk by Liberation Tigers of Tamil Eelam mines. |
| Tamanlar II | Turkey | The cargo ship collided with another vessel and sank in the Mediterranean Sea off Bizerta, Algeria (37°48′N 9°50′E). Seven of her ten crew were reported missing. |

=== 14 June ===
List of shipwrecks: 15 June 1996
| Ship | State | Description |
|---|---|---|
| Olmos | Peru | The fishing vessel ran aground and sank off the Islotes Tres Marias. |

=== 15 June ===
List of shipwrecks: 15 June 1996
| Ship | State | Description |
|---|---|---|
| Anna Spiratou | Cyprus | The bulk carrier collided with the bulk carrier Polydefkis P. (Greece) and sank off Pusan, South Korea (34°39′N 128°55′E). Her 26 crew were reported missing. |
| Baltic Rescuer | Panama | The tug sank at Port of Spain, Trinidad. |

=== 16 June ===
List of shipwrecks: 16 June 1996
| Ship | State | Description |
|---|---|---|
| Galp Funchal | Portugal | The tanker was damaged by weather off Port Elizabeth, South Africa. Declared a constructive total loss, she arrived at Alang, India on 11 December for scrapping. |

=== 19 June ===
List of shipwrecks: 19 June 1996
| Ship | State | Description |
|---|---|---|
| Dolwen | Honduras | The ship foundered in the Indian Ocean (20°49′N 71°19′E). Her nine crew were rescued. |
| Mariner II | Saint Vincent and the Grenadines | The cargo ship ran aground at Mumbai, India during a cyclone. She was refloated on 25 June, but was declared a constructive total loss. |
| Prime VIII | Vanuatu | The cargo ship foundered in the Indian Ocean off Hazira, India (20°44′N 72°40′E) during a cyclone with the loss of three of her twelve crew. One person was reported missing. |

=== 20 June ===
List of shipwrecks: 20 June 1996
| Ship | State | Description |
|---|---|---|
| Million Hope | Cyprus | The bulk carrier ran aground and sank off Sharm el Sheik, Egypt (28°03′N 34°26′E). Her crew were rescued. |
| Starlite | United States | The 35-foot (10.7 m) salmon gillnetter was destroyed by a stack fire and sank in Prince William Sound near Hinchinbrook Entrance (60°20′N 146°50′W) on the south-central coast of Alaska. The only person aboard survived. |
| Subaru II | Saint Vincent and the Grenadines | The refrigerated cargo ship foundered in the South China Sea (7°01′55″N 110°03′05″E). Her fifteen crew were rescued. |

=== 21 June ===
List of shipwrecks: 21 June 1996
| Ship | State | Description |
|---|---|---|
| Indian Explorer | India | The cargo ship ran aground off Karanjia Island during a cyclone. Declared a constructive total loss, she was later refloated, and sailed on 22 September for Alang for scrapping. |

=== 23 June ===
List of shipwrecks: 23 June 1996
| Ship | State | Description |
|---|---|---|
| Nadine | flag unknown | The 167-foot (50.9 m) yacht sank en route from the Italian mainland to Sardinia during a mistral storm. All passengers and crew were rescued by the Italian coast guard. A fictionalized version of the sinking is depicted in the 2013 film The Wolf of Wall Street. |

=== 24 June ===
List of shipwrecks: 24 June 1996
| Ship | State | Description |
|---|---|---|
| Koyo Maru No.2 | Japan | The ro-ro ship collided with the bulk carrier Crest Unity (Panama) and sank off Namikata with the loss of two of her crew. Two people were reported missing. |

=== 27 June ===
List of shipwrecks: 27 June 1996
| Ship | State | Description |
|---|---|---|
| Northern Voyager | Canada | The fishing vessel capsized and sank 44 nautical miles (81 km) east of St. Anthony, Newfoundland and Labrador. Her fourteen crew were rescued. |

=== 28 June ===
List of shipwrecks: 28 June 1996
| Ship | State | Description |
|---|---|---|
| William Shakespear | Panama | The bulk carrier foundered in the Indian Ocean (14°29′N 59°22′E). Her seventeen crew were rescued. |

=== 30 June ===
List of shipwrecks: 30 June 1996
| Ship | State | Description |
|---|---|---|
| N'Tid-1 | Mauritania | The fishing vessel caught fire and sank off the west coast of Africa. |

== July ==
=== 1 July ===
List of shipwrecks: 1 July 1996
| Ship | State | Description |
|---|---|---|
| Barkaat-107 | Saint Vincent and the Grenadines | The cargo ship reported being in the Indian Ocean 60 nautical miles (110 km) off Porbanjar, India. No further trace, presumed foundered with the loss of all nineteen crew. |
| Golden Unite | Belize | The cargo ship collided with the chemical tanker Hang Chang No.8 (Flag unknown) and sank off Kunsan, South Korea (35°51′N 125°50′E) with the loss of a crew member. |

=== 2 July ===
List of shipwrecks: 2 July 1996
| Ship | State | Description |
|---|---|---|
| Daiei Maru No.16 | Japan | The cargo ship collided with the container ship Taisetsusan Maru (Japan) and sank 2.6 nautical miles (4.8 km) off the Inubo Zaki Lighthouse. Her crew survived. |
| Kamishak Queen | United States | The 76-foot (23.2 m) fishing vessel sank off Gore Point (59°12′00″N 150°57′30″W) on Nuka Island off the Kenai Peninsula on the south-central coast of Alaska. Both crew were rescued by helicopter. |

=== 3 July ===
List of shipwrecks: 3 July 1996
| Ship | State | Description |
|---|---|---|
| Amphion | Greece | The bulk carrier collided with the bulk carrier Mike K. (Cyprus) at Bhavnagar, India. She subsequently came ashore (21°38′N 72°18′E). Declared a constructive total loss, she was later refloated and taken to Alang, India for scrapping. |
| Tenyo Maru No.8 | Japan | The cargo ship collided with J. Pioneer (Flag unknown) and sank south west of Yokohama. Her three crew were rescued. |

=== 4 July ===
List of shipwrecks: 4 July 1996
| Ship | State | Description |
|---|---|---|
| Divemaster | United States | The 30-foot (9.1 m) fishing vessel struck a submerged object and sank 20 nautical miles (37 km; 23 mi) south of Wrangell, Alaska. The only person aboard survived. |

=== 9 July ===
List of shipwrecks: 11 July 1996
| Ship | State | Description |
|---|---|---|
| Inganess Bay | Antigua and Barbuda | Hurricane Bertha: The cargo ship was driven ashore at Road Harbour, Tortola. Declared a constructive total loss, she was later refloated and scuttled in the Caribbean Sea (18°22′04″N 64°30′07″W. |

=== 11 July ===
List of shipwrecks: 11 July 1996
| Ship | State | Description |
|---|---|---|
| Csav Tolten | Cyprus | The cargo ship caught fire in the English Channel off Start Point, Devon, United Kingdom (49°29′N 3°29′W). A salvage tug assisted in fighting the fire and towed her to Rotterdam, South Holland, Netherlands. Declared a constructive total loss, she arrived at Aliağa, Turkey on 29 October for scrapping. |

=== 15 July ===
List of shipwrecks: 15 July 1996
| Ship | State | Description |
|---|---|---|
| Kofoku Maru No.5 | Japan | The dredger collided with MV Rich Star (1978) (Saint Vincent and the Grenadines) and sank south of Jizo Saki. Her five crew were rescued. |

=== 16 July ===
List of shipwrecks: 16 July 1996
| Ship | State | Description |
|---|---|---|
| MS Fortune | United States | The 38-foot (11.6 m) fishing vessel was destroyed by fire in the Bering Sea at Cape Seniavin (56°24′N 160°09′W) on the north coast of the Alaska Peninsula. |

=== 18 July ===
List of shipwrecks: 18 July 1996
| Ship | State | Description |
|---|---|---|
| Lady Launi | United States | While under tow with no one aboard, the 48-foot (14.6 m) fishing vessel sank approximately 100 nautical miles (190 km; 120 mi) southwest of Kodiak, Alaska. |

=== 19 July ===
List of shipwrecks: 19 July 1996
| Ship | State | Description |
|---|---|---|
| Amelie | Belize | The cargo ship foundered 150 nautical miles (280 km) east south east of Trinidad (8°55′N 59°30′W). Her ten crew were rescued. |
| SLNS Ranavirh | Sri Lanka Navy | Sri Lankan Civil War: First Battle of Mullaitivu: The Type 062 patrol boat was sunk by the Liberation Tigers of Tamil Eelam with two explosive motorboats. Lost with all 36 hands. |

=== 20 July ===
List of shipwrecks: 20 July 1996
| Ship | State | Description |
|---|---|---|
| Bakhchisaray | Russia | The fishing vessel caught fire at Le Havre, Seine-Maritime, France. Declared a constructive total loss, she departed for Aliağa, Turken on 13 August for scrapping. |

=== 22 July ===
List of shipwrecks: 22 July 1996
| Ship | State | Description |
|---|---|---|
| Caroline | United States | The 32-foot (9.8 m) salmon gillnetter burned and sank in Kvichak Bay on the Bristol Bay coast of Alaska. Her crew of three survived. |
| Laura Haden | United States | The tug collided with the chemical tanker Stolt Hawk (Liberia) and sank in the Houston Ship Channel. She was subsequently refloated and scrapped. |

=== 23 July ===
List of shipwrecks: 23 July 1996
| Ship | State | Description |
|---|---|---|
| Sundance | Cyprus | The cargo ship foundered in the Indian Ocean (7°00′06″N 54°47′07″E). Two of her 29 crew were reported missing. |

=== 25 July ===
List of shipwrecks: 25 July 1996
| Ship | State | Description |
|---|---|---|
| Estella | United States | The 58-foot (17.7 m) fishing vessel ran aground and sank in Sukoi Inlet (57°14′N 135°36′W) in Southeast Alaska. All six people aboard survived. |
| Fuga I | Honduras | The cargo ship foundered 42 nautical miles (78 km) south east of Saint Kitts with the loss of a crew member. |

=== 27 July ===
List of shipwrecks: 27 July 1996
| Ship | State | Description |
|---|---|---|
| Gas Luck | Panama | The LPG tanker foundered in the East China Sea (31°21′N 125°52′E). Her sixteen crew were rescued. |

=== 29 July ===
List of shipwrecks: 29 July 1996
| Ship | State | Description |
|---|---|---|
| Arfivik | Uruguay | The fishing vessel foundered 90 nautical miles (170 km) south east of La Paloma. Her 36 crew were rescued. |

=== 31 July ===
List of shipwrecks: 31 July 1996
| Ship | State | Description |
|---|---|---|
| Vulcan de Tamia | Spain | The ro-ro ship collided with the container ship Ever Reach (Panama) and sank in the Mediterranean Sea 45 nautical miles (83 km) south of Nerja (36°15′N 3°51′W). One of her nineteen crew was reported missing. |

== August ==
=== 2 August ===
List of shipwrecks: 2 August 1996
| Ship | State | Description |
|---|---|---|
| Martie | United States | The 43-foot (13.1 m) salmon seiner sank at Evans Island in Prince William Sound on the south-central coast of Alaska. Her entire crew of five survived. |

=== 3 August ===
List of shipwrecks: 3 August 1996
| Ship | State | Description |
|---|---|---|
| Colleen | United States | The retired 92-foot (28.0 m), 150-gross register ton Erie Canal tug was scuttled as an artificial reef in the North Atlantic Ocean 2 nautical miles (3.7 km; 2.3 mi) off Mantoloking, New Jersey, in 80 feet (24 m) of water at 40°02.794′N 073°59.350′W. |

=== 4 August ===
List of shipwrecks: 4 August 1996
| Ship | State | Description |
|---|---|---|
| Ceibe Un | Spain | The fishing vessel foundered in the Atlantic Ocean (2°23′N 1°06′E). Her seventeen crew were rescued. |

=== 6 August ===
List of shipwrecks: 6 August 1996
| Ship | State | Description |
|---|---|---|
| Lou-Ann-Marie | United States | The 32-foot (9.8 m) fishing vessel burned and sank in the Bering Sea approximately 120 nautical miles (220 km; 140 mi) northwest of Dutch Harbor, Alaska. Her crew of three survived. |
| Osceola | United States | The fishing vessel capsized and sank in the Yellow Sea. Two of her four crew were reported missing. |

=== 7 August ===
List of shipwrecks: 7 August 1996
| Ship | State | Description |
|---|---|---|
| Alice M | United States | The 29-foot (8.8 m) gillnet salmon-fishing vessel burned and sank in Nushagak Bay on the Bristol Bay coast of Alaska. |

=== 10 August ===
List of shipwrecks: 10 August 1996
| Ship | State | Description |
|---|---|---|
| California Hermes | Liberia | The container ship caught fire 16.5 nautical miles (30.6 km) off Cape Nosappu, Japan (43°09′N 156°12′E). She was towed in to Yokohama, Japan on 1 September. Declared a constructive total loss, she departed for Shanghai, China on 8 October for scrapping. |
| Xin Tai | China | The cargo ship collided with the chemical tanker Kyung Yang (South Korea) and sank in the East China Sea (34°41′N 122°38′E). Two of her 35 crew were reported missing. |

=== 11 August ===
List of shipwrecks: 11 August 1996
| Ship | State | Description |
|---|---|---|
| Rainbow Melody | Panama | Typhoon Kirk: The cargo ship foundered south of Okinawa, Japan. Her 22 crew were rescued. |

=== 14 August ===
List of shipwrecks: 14 August 1996
| Ship | State | Description |
|---|---|---|
| Tokiwa Maru | Japan | Typhoon Kirk: The refrigerated cargo ship ran aground at Kagoshima. Declared a constructive total loss, she was refloated with the assistance of a tug on 20 August and was towed to Amakusa for scrapping. |

=== 15 August ===
List of shipwrecks: 15 August 1996
| Ship | State | Description |
|---|---|---|
| Tenwa Maru | Panama | The cargo ship foundered 97 nautical miles (180 km) off Misaki, Japan. Her 19 crew were rescued. |

=== 16 August ===
List of shipwrecks: 16 August 1996
| Ship | State | Description |
|---|---|---|
| Al Hadi | Saint Vincent and the Grenadines | The bulk carrier foundered off Mumbai, India. Her 23 crew were rescued. |

=== 18 August ===
List of shipwrecks: 18 August 1996
| Ship | State | Description |
|---|---|---|
| Herceg Novi | Malta | The cargo ship collided with Ming Galaxy (China) and sank 3.3 nautical miles (6.1 km) east of the Raffles Lighthouse, Singapore (01°09′N 103°47′E). Her 32 crew were rescued. |
| River Andoni | Nigeria | The cargo ship caught fire at Birkenhead, Merseyside, United Kingdom. The fire was extinguished. Declared a constructive total loss, she arrived at Aliağa, Turkey on 7 January 1997 for scrapping. |

=== 20 August ===
List of shipwrecks: 20 August 1996
| Ship | State | Description |
|---|---|---|
| USS YOGN-8 | United States Navy | The decommissioned 165-foot (50.3 m) non-self-propelled gasoline barge was scuttled as an artificial reef in the North Atlantic Ocean 6.5 nautical miles (12.0 km; 7.5 mi) off Harvey Cedars, New Jersey, in 80 feet (24 m) of water at 39°37.564′N 074°01.341′W. Her wreck is known as "John Dobilas." |

=== 25 August ===
List of shipwrecks: 25 August 1996
| Ship | State | Description |
|---|---|---|
| Ocean Beauty | United States | The 30-foot (9.1 m) fishing vessel was wrecked at Port Moller (59°59′30″N 160°34′30″W), Alaska. Her crew of two survived. |

=== 29 August ===
List of shipwrecks: 29 August 1996
| Ship | State | Description |
|---|---|---|
| Uniceb | Panama | The cargo ship caught fire in the Indian Ocean (5°12′S 65°19′E). Presumed foundered with the loss of one of her 55 crew. |

=== 30 August ===
List of shipwrecks: 29 August 1996
| Ship | State | Description |
|---|---|---|
| Sky Seal | Panama | The research vessel foundered in the Atlantic Ocean (18°30′N 65°45′W). Her crew were rescued. |

== September ==
=== 1 September ===
List of shipwrecks: 1 September 1996
| Ship | State | Description |
|---|---|---|
| Fair Leader | Belize | The cargo ship collided with the barge Yukikaze No.2 (Japan) and sank in the Sea of Izo (33°43′N 131°48′E). One of her eight crew was reported missing. |

=== 2 September ===
List of shipwrecks: 2 September 1996
| Ship | State | Description |
|---|---|---|
| North Wind | United States | The fishing vessel ran aground and sank in Fancy Cove on the coast of British Columbia, Canada (52°09′00″N 128°01′18″W). Her five crew were rescued. |
| Thomas W | United States | The 35-foot (10.7 m) vessel sank in Gibson Cove (57°46′45″N 152°26′40″W) in Alaska. No one was aboard her at the time. |
| Uniceb | Panama | The livestock carrier suffered an engine fire in the Pacific Ocean north of the Seychelles. She was abandoned by her crew and subsequently sank. |

=== 5 September ===
List of shipwrecks: 5 September 1960
| Ship | State | Description |
|---|---|---|
| Ivanof II | United States | The 36-foot (11.0 m) fishing vessel was destroyed 2 nautical miles (3.7 km; 2.3 mi) north of Seldovia, Alaska, by a fire that started in her cook stove. Her crew of two survived. |

=== 9 September ===
List of shipwrecks: 9 September 1996
| Ship | State | Description |
|---|---|---|
| Kira | Panama | The chemical tanker foundered in the Mediterranean Sea 18 nautical miles (33 km) off the Pelponnese, Greece (36°24′N 21°21′E). Her eighteen crew were reported missing. |

=== 12 September ===
List of shipwrecks: 12 September 1996
| Ship | State | Description |
|---|---|---|
| Sea Lion | United States | The 32-foot (9.8 m) fishing vessel was wrecked at Fox Island (60°10′N 144°37′W) near Katalla, Alaska. |

=== 13 September ===
List of shipwrecks: 13 September 1996
| Ship | State | Description |
|---|---|---|
| Praga | Chile | The cargo ship capsized and sank in the Pacific Ocean 60 nautical miles (110 km) off Quintero. Three of her eight crew were reported missing. |

=== 14 September ===
List of shipwrecks: 14 September 1996
| Ship | State | Description |
|---|---|---|
| Iolcos Victory | Cyprus | The bulk carrier foundered in the Atlantic Ocean 107 nautical miles (198 km) south of Cape St. Francis, South Africa (35°57′S 24°38′E) with the loss of five of her 25 crew. |

=== 15 September ===
List of shipwrecks: 15 September 1996
| Ship | State | Description |
|---|---|---|
| Sauniere | Canada | The self-unloading bulk carrier ran aground on the Bay State Shoal in the St. Lawrence River near Brockville, Ontario. The bottom shell plating on the starboard side was damaged and the #1 starboard ballast tank being was holed in three places. After being freed, Sauniere sailed to Hamilton, Ontario to unload its cargo and then to Port Weller Dry Docks at St. Catharines, Ontario for repairs. |

=== 16 September ===
List of shipwrecks: 16 September 1996
| Ship | State | Description |
|---|---|---|
| GB22, GB23, GB24 | Eritrean Navy | The GB11-class patrol boats were lost on this date. |

=== 17 September ===
List of shipwrecks: 17 September 1996
| Ship | State | Description |
|---|---|---|
| Bien Dong No.08 | Vietnam | The cargo ship foundered off Da Nang (16°29′N 108°47′E) with the loss of thre of her twenty crew. Three people were reported missing. |

=== 18 September ===
List of shipwrecks: 18 September 1996
| Ship | State | Description |
|---|---|---|
| Unidentified Sang-O-class submarine | Korean People's Navy | The Sang-O-class submarine ran aground on the east coast of South Korea near Jeongdongjin while trying to retrieve a three-person North Korean special operations reconnaissance team it had landed there three days earlier. Its crew abandoned it, and it was captured by South Korean forces. |

=== 19 September ===
List of shipwrecks: 19 September 1996
| Ship | State | Description |
|---|---|---|
| Golden Pacific | Panama | The refrigerated cargo ship ran aground off Kutu Island, Micronesia (5°26′N 153°27′E). Her fifteen crew were rescued. |

=== 22 September ===
List of shipwrecks: 22 September 1996
| Ship | State | Description |
|---|---|---|
| Lord Nelson | Honduras | The cargo ship was driven ashore at Galle, Sri Lanka with the loss of one of her five crew. She was a total loss. |
| Thunder Marine | Panama | The cargo ship collided with Kowa Maru (Japan) and was then driven ashore at Kisarazu. She was refloated. Declared a constructive total loss, she arrived under tow at Setoda on 12 October for scrapping. |

=== 24 September ===
List of shipwrecks: 24 September 1996
| Ship | State | Description |
|---|---|---|
| Aldebaran | Belize | The cargo ship collided with the bulk carrier United Confidence (Cyprus) and sank off Mokpo, South Korea (31°22′N 135°40′E). Four of her crew were reported missing. |
| Grom | United States | The 39-foot (11.9 m) gillnet salmon-fishing vessel was wrecked in Shelter Bay (60°26′N 146°39′W) in Prince William Sound on the south-central coast of Alaska. |

=== 25 September ===
List of shipwrecks: 25 September 1996
| Ship | State | Description |
|---|---|---|
| Fenes | Panama | The cargo ship was driven ashore in the Lavezzi Islands, Corse-du-Sud, France. She broke in two on 16 October and was a total loss. |

=== 26 September ===
List of shipwrecks: 6 September 1996
| Ship | State | Description |
|---|---|---|
| Gulf Express | Ghana | The fishing vessel sank at Monrovia, Liberia. |

=== 27 September ===
List of shipwrecks: 27 September 1996
| Ship | State | Description |
|---|---|---|
| Estornino | United Kingdom | The fishing vessel foundered in the Atlantic Ocean (49°28′N 10°43′W). Her ten crew were rescued. |
| Gypsy | United States | The 33-foot (10.1 m) vessel sank in Marmot Bay (58°00′N 152°06′W) in Alaska′s Kodiak Archipelago. |

=== Unknown date ===
List of shipwrecks: Unknown date 1996
| Ship | State | Description |
|---|---|---|
| Captain Keith Tibbetts | Cayman Islands | The decommissioned Koni-class frigate was scuttled as an artificial reef off Grand Cayman Island sometime in September. |
| HMFS Kiro | Republic of Fiji Navy | The decommissioned Redwing-class minesweeper was being towed to sea to be scuttled but broke loose when the tow pad ripped loose from her rotten deck and she was wrecked on a reef off Suva. The wreck was disposed of by burning. |

== October ==
=== 2 October ===
List of shipwrecks: 2 October 1996
| Ship | State | Description |
|---|---|---|
| Margaret N | United States | The 30-foot (9.1 m) fishing vessel sank at Hydaburg, Alaska. Her crew of two survived. |

=== 4 October ===
List of shipwrecks: 4 October 1996
| Ship | State | Description |
|---|---|---|
| Tracy | United States | The vessel was wrecked on rocks in Gibson Cove (57°46′45″N 152°26′40″W) on the coast of Kodiak Island near Kodiak, Alaska. Her owner burned the wreck after stripping it. |

=== 5 October ===
List of shipwrecks: 5 October 1996
| Ship | State | Description |
|---|---|---|
| Alaska Dawn | United States | The 90-foot (27.4 m) fishing vessel was wrecked on the north coast of Andronica Island in Alaska′s Shumagin Islands off the south coast of the Alaska Peninsula 56°20′N 160°10′W) after her captain fell asleep at her helm. Her crew of four abandoned ship and were taken by a skiff from the vessel Vardal (United States) to the vessel Exodus (United States). Alaska Dawn later was later refloated and scuttled. |

=== 12 October ===
List of shipwrecks: 17 October 1996
| Ship | State | Description |
|---|---|---|
| Jia Xiu Shan | China | The cargo ship in the South China Sea (22°24′N 115°06′E). Her eleven crew were rescued. |

=== 16 October ===
List of shipwrecks: 16 October 1996
| Ship | State | Description |
|---|---|---|
| Akav Express | Togo | The offshore supply vessel was driven ashore at Grand Popo, Benin. |

=== 17 October ===
List of shipwrecks: 17 October 1996
| Ship | State | Description |
|---|---|---|
| AG Apostolos | Malta | The bulk carrier caught fire off Unchungdo, South Korea. She was towed to Kunsan. Declared a constructive total loss, she arrived at Zhenjiang, China on 4 January 1997 for scrapping. |
| Matt Turecamo | United States | The retired 86-foot (26.2 m) tug was scuttled as an artificial reef in the North Atlantic Ocean 3.6 nautical miles (6.7 km; 4.1 mi) off Sea Girt, New Jersey, in 80 feet (24 m) of water at 40°07.514′N 073°56.465′W. Her main deck is at a depth of 65 feet (20 m). |

=== 24 October ===
List of shipwrecks: 24 October 1996
| Ship | State | Description |
|---|---|---|
| Balkanstar 2 | Saint Vincent and the Grenadines | The cargo ship foudered i the Black Sea 8.1 nautical miles (15 km) off Cape Kaliakra, Bulgaria (43°14′N 28°46′W). One of her crew was reported missing. |
| Dan Feng | China | The cargo ship collided with the fishing vessel Suzu Maru No.21. She capsized and sank 50 nautical miles (93 km) south of Cape Sukuton, Japan. Her 24 crew were rescued. |
| Rebecca B | United States | The 77-foot (23.5 m) longline fishing vessel was wrecked on a shoal 50 feet (15 meters) off the coast at Cape Sasmik (51°36′30″N 177°55′00″W) on Tanaga Island in the western Andreanof Islands in the southwestern Aleutian Islands. A United States Navy salvage tug rescued her entire crew of seven. |

=== 28 October ===
List of shipwrecks: 28 October 1996
| Ship | State | Description |
|---|---|---|
| Lucky Logger | United States | The 26-foot (7.9 m) bowpicker sank at the entrance to Day Harbor on the south-central coast of Alaska. A United States Coast Guard helicopter rescued the only person aboard. |

=== 30 October ===
List of shipwrecks: 30 October 1996
| Ship | State | Description |
|---|---|---|
| Kyoei Maru No.8 | Japan | The bulk carrier capsized in the Inland Sea of Japan with the loss of two of her five crew. Two people were reported missing. She was towed to Etajima. Declared a constructive total loss, she was scrapped. |

=== Unknown date ===
List of shipwrecks: unknown date in October 1996
| Ship | State | Description |
|---|---|---|
| SLNS P-457 | Sri Lanka Navy | Sri Lankan Civil War: The Dvora-class patrol boat was sunk by the Liberation Tigers of Tamil Eelam sometime in October. |

== November ==
=== 2 November ===
List of shipwrecks: 2 November 1996
| Ship | State | Description |
|---|---|---|
| Ning Hai | China | The bulk carrier ran aground in the Sea of Okhotsk (47°18′N 152°31′E). She sank on 10 November. Her crew were rescued. |

=== 3 November ===
List of shipwrecks: 3 November 1996
| Ship | State | Description |
|---|---|---|
| Celiktrans | Turkey | The cargo ship collided with Maria I (Flag unknown) and sank in the Bosphorus off Yeniköy with the loss of a crew member. |

=== 4 November ===
List of shipwrecks: 4 November 1996
| Ship | State | Description |
|---|---|---|
| Bristol Storm | United States | The 117-foot (35.7 m) crab-fishing vessel sank in heavy weather in 228 feet (69 m) of water in the Bering Sea northwest of Port Moller (56°50′N 162°34′W), Alaska, after uncontrollable flooding began in her pump room. The fishing vessel New Venture (United States) rescued her crew of six. |

=== 5 November ===
List of shipwrecks: 5 November 1996
| Ship | State | Description |
|---|---|---|
| Capt. Enrico | Panama | The fishing vessel foundered in the Atlantic Ocean (11°29′N 61°28′W). Her crew were rescued. |

=== 9 November ===
List of shipwrecks: 9 November 1996
| Ship | State | Description |
|---|---|---|
| Guernsey Express | Philippines | Typhoon Dale: The cargo ship foundered 32 nautical miles (60 km) off Guam (13°02′N 144°01′E). Her crew were rescued. |

=== 11 November ===
List of shipwrecks: 11 November 1996
| Ship | State | Description |
|---|---|---|
| Bever | Netherlands | The tug capsized and sank in the North Sea off Great Yarmouth, Norfolk, United Kingdom with the loss of one of her two crew. |

=== 13 November ===
List of shipwrecks: 13 November 1996
| Ship | State | Description |
|---|---|---|
| Cordigliera | Panama | The cargo ship foundered 7 nautical miles (13 km) off the mouth of the Mbhasha River, South Africa (31°21′S 30°01′E) with the loss of five of her 29 crew. The rest were reported missing. |

=== 14 November ===
List of shipwrecks: 14 November 1996
| Ship | State | Description |
|---|---|---|
| Cordigliera | Panama | After placing a distress call to Durban Radio at 10:30 pm requesting immediate assistance due to a leak in a hold, the freighter sank off South Africa off Port St Johns with the loss of all 23 lives. |
| Mathias | Germany | The cargo ship sank in the Elbe with the loss of one of her two crew. She was refloated on 30 December and towed to Cuxhaven for scrapping. |
| Princess Jihan | Egypt | The riverboat capsized and sank in the Nile at Qalh al-Jabal with the loss of over 20 lives. |

=== 15 November ===
List of shipwrecks: 15 November 1996
| Ship | State | Description |
|---|---|---|
| Aunt Bergit | United States | The 38-foot (11.6 m) fishing vessel was destroyed by fire off Hinchinbrook Island off the south-central coast of Alaska. Her crew of three survived. |
| Pulsar | Russia | The cargo ship capsized and sank off Hokkaido, Japan (43°45′N 138°44′E) with the loss of two of her 24 crew. |

=== 18 November ===
List of shipwrecks: 18 November 1996
| Ship | State | Description |
|---|---|---|
| Blue Sky | Panama | The cargo ship was presumed to have foundered 123 nautical miles (228 km) off the Haterumajima Lighthouse, Japan. Her crew were rescued. |
| Kuo Lie | Taiwan | The cargo ship ran aground in the South China Sea (24°40′N 120°46′E). Her crew survived. She was declared a constructive total loss. |

=== 22 November ===
List of shipwrecks: 22 November 1996
| Ship | State | Description |
|---|---|---|
| Halstenbek | Belize | The cargo ship foundered in the Baltic Sea 40 nautical miles (74 km) off Niechorze, Poland (54°31′N 14°58′E) with the loss of one of her five crew. |

=== 24 November ===
List of shipwrecks: 26 November 1996
| Ship | State | Description |
|---|---|---|
| Promex Aman | Malaysia | The cargo ship foundered in the South China Sea. Her twenty crew were rescued. |

=== 26 November ===
List of shipwrecks: 26 November 1996
| Ship | State | Description |
|---|---|---|
| Franz Hals | Russia | Franz Hals The factory ship was driven ashore at Biarritz, France. She was refloated on 21 December. |
| Tamra Dawn | United States | The 29-foot (8.8 m) sea cucumber and sea urchin dive boat sank off Dall Head (55°08′N 131°45′W) southwest of Ketchikan in Southeast Alaska during a diving expedition for sea cucumbers. Her entire crew of three perished. |

=== 29 November ===
List of shipwrecks: 29 November1996
| Ship | State | Description |
|---|---|---|
| Fu Kuo Hsin No.2 | Taiwan | The bulk carrier ran aground 1.5 nautical miles (2.8 km) north of the Hirara Lighthouse, Japan. She sank the next day. Her crew were rescued. |

=== Unknown date ===
List of shipwrecks: Unknown date in November1996
| Ship | State | Description |
|---|---|---|
| Lene Marie | Denmark | The ketch was abandoned in a storm in the North Atlantic. |

== December ==
=== 2 December ===
List of shipwrecks: 2 December 1996
| Ship | State | Description |
|---|---|---|
| Billy B | United States | The 30-foot (9.1 m) fishing vessel was swamped in the surf and sank off Warren Island in the Alexander Archipelago in Southeast Alaska near Klawock, Alaska. Her crew of two survived. |

=== 3 December ===
List of shipwrecks: 3 December 1996
| Ship | State | Description |
|---|---|---|
| Deann | United States | The 25-foot (7.6 m) fishing vessel sank off Fish Egg Island (55°29′20″N 133°10′15″W) in Southeast Alaska. All three people aboard survived. |
| Moon Jin | South Korea | The cargo ship caught fire, exploded and sank 20 nautical miles (37 km) west north west of the Futaishima Lighthouse, Japan (34°16′N 130°27′E). |

=== 5 December ===
List of shipwrecks: 5 December 1996
| Ship | State | Description |
|---|---|---|
| Bristol | Russia | The fishing vessel ran aground and sank off Moneron Island (46°10′N 141°15′E). Her twenty crew were rescued. |
| El Dan | United States | The 61.3-foot (18.7 m) crab-fishing vessel capsized and sank in Portage Bay (57°34′05″N 156°02′15″W) on the south coast of the Alaska Peninsula just west of Kanatak, Alaska, during a storm. Wearing survival suits, her crew of five abandoned ship in a life raft and was rescued. |

=== 8 December ===
List of shipwrecks: 8 December 1996
| Ship | State | Description |
|---|---|---|
| Jin Peng | Honduras | The cargo ship in the East China Sea (38°31′N 128°49′E). Her nine crew were rescued. |

=== 9 December ===
List of shipwrecks: 9 December 1996
| Ship | State | Description |
|---|---|---|
| Alexandria | United States | The schooner sank in the Atlantic Ocean off Cape Hatteras, North Carolina. |
| Federico Barreras | Spain | The cargo ship sank at Vigo. |

=== 12 December ===
List of shipwrecks: 12 December 1996
| Ship | State | Description |
|---|---|---|
| Oceanic | United States | The 48-foot (14.6 m) shrimp-fishing vessel sank with the loss of one life in the Gulf of Alaska 23 nautical miles (43 km; 26 mi) southwest of Craig, Alaska. There were two survivors. |

=== 14 December ===
List of shipwrecks: 14 December 1996
| Ship | State | Description |
|---|---|---|
| Feliks Kon | Russia | The fishing vessel foundred in Nagayeva Bay. |
| Makani Kanalio | United States | The 39-foot (11.9 m) fishing vessel burned and sank at Unalaska, Alaska. The only person aboard survived. |

=== 19 December ===
List of shipwrecks: 19 December 1996
| Ship | State | Description |
|---|---|---|
| Seatrain Princess | Thailand | The passenger ship caught fire and sank at Phuket. Declared a constructive total loss, she was refloated and scrapped. |

=== 22 December ===
List of shipwrecks: 22 December 1996
| Ship | State | Description |
|---|---|---|
| Blue Sky II | Panama | The chemical tanker foundered in the East China Sea (30°48′N 124°37′E). |

=== 24 December ===
List of shipwrecks: 24 December 1996
| Ship | State | Description |
|---|---|---|
| Berrack S. | Honduras | The cargo ship foundered off Istanbul, Turkey. Her crew were rescued. |
| Mister Bill | United States | Tropical Storm Fern: The offshore supply vessel foundered 85 nautical miles (157 km) off Yap Island, Caroline Islands (11°13′N 165°25′E). Her eight crew were rescued. |

=== 25 December ===
List of shipwrecks: 25 December 1996
| Ship | State | Description |
|---|---|---|
| Ansa-9 | Belize | The fishing vessel was driven ashore at Ponta Delgada, Azores. She was a total loss. |
| F174 | Flag unknown | The wooden ship sank overnight 19 nautical miles (35 km; 22 mi) from Portopalo di Capo Passero, Sicily, Italy, while transporting illegal immigrants to Italy after either breaking up in stormy weather or colliding with the cargo ship Iohan El Hallal (Malta), killing at least 283 people. |
| Seabird I | Panama | The tanker was driven onto the breakwater at Ponta Delgada, Azores and was a total loss. |
| Starlight | Panama | The tanker was driven onto the breakwater at Ponta Delgada. She subsequently broke in two and was a total loss. |

=== 28 December ===
List of shipwrecks: 28 December 1996
| Ship | State | Description |
|---|---|---|
| Dystos | Greece | The bulk carrier capsized in the Mediterranean Sea off Euboea. She was towed to Kimi and beached but subsequently sank with the loss of one of her 21 crew. Three people were reported missing. |

=== 30 December ===
List of shipwrecks: 30 December 1996
| Ship | State | Description |
|---|---|---|
| Kargat | Russia | The fishing vessel caught fire and sank in the Sea of Okhotsk (38°54′N 132°39′E). Four of her 71 crew were reported missing. |
| 270 unnamed boats | United States | A snowy Pacific Northwest windstorm caused the roof collapse of 17 of the 19 structures at the Edmonds, Washington, marina, sinking 270 boats out of the 400 moored at the marina. |

=== Unknown date ===
List of shipwrecks: Unknown date in December 1996
| Ship | State | Description |
|---|---|---|
| Wan Li Da | China | The cargo ship was presumed to have foundered in the South China Sea after 12 December. |

== Unknown date ==
List of shipwrecks: Unknown date 1996
| Ship | State | Description |
|---|---|---|
| Ariel | Honduras | The cargo ship was destroyed by fire at Boulogne, Pas-de-Calais, France before the end of April. |
| Dystos | Greece | Sank with some loss of life. |
| Mr. J | United States | The crab processor – a former PCE-842-class patrol craft and auxiliary minelayer – was towed out into the Pacific Ocean and scuttled sometime in the 1990s. |
| SLNS P-225 | Sri Lanka Navy | Sri Lankan Civil War: The patrol boat was sunk by the Liberation Tigers of Tamil Eelam sometime in 1996. |
| Unidentified barge | United States | The retired 80-foot (24.4 m) steel-hulled barge was scuttled as an artificial reef in the North Atlantic Ocean south of Long Island 2.5 nautical miles (4.6 km; 2.9 mi) off Moriches Inlet, New York. |
