= Humpy Cove =

- Location within Alaska
- Location: Kenai Peninsula, Alaska
- Coordinates: 56.8596°N 154.0181°W
- Primary inflows: Humpy Creek
- Basin countries: United States
- Max. length: 1 mi (1.6 km)
- Max. width: ≥1 mi (1.6 km)
- Average depth: 60 ft (18 m)
- Max. depth: ≥300 ft (91 m)
- Frozen: Never

Humpy Cove is an inlet of Resurrection Bay on the Kenai Peninsula of the U.S. state of Alaska. Located 11 miles from Seward, it has the shape of a whale's tail, and consists of two smaller bays. The cove is often used as an anchorage for recreational boaters. It received its name from the plentiful returns of pink salmon that spawn in Humpy Creek, the inflow of the southern bay. The cove is a popular tourist destination as well, due to Orca Island Cabins and kayak tours offered by Miller's Landing. Humpy Cove has runs of rockfish, halibut, coho salmon, chinook salmon, and chum salmon as well as pinks, and a popular fishing spot is near the Iron Door, the remains of a searchlight and bunker from World War II. The cove contains the only road on the Resurrection Peninsula, a stretch of pavement leading to the aforementioned searchlight.
