= Fourth of July Creek (Kenai Peninsula, Alaska) =

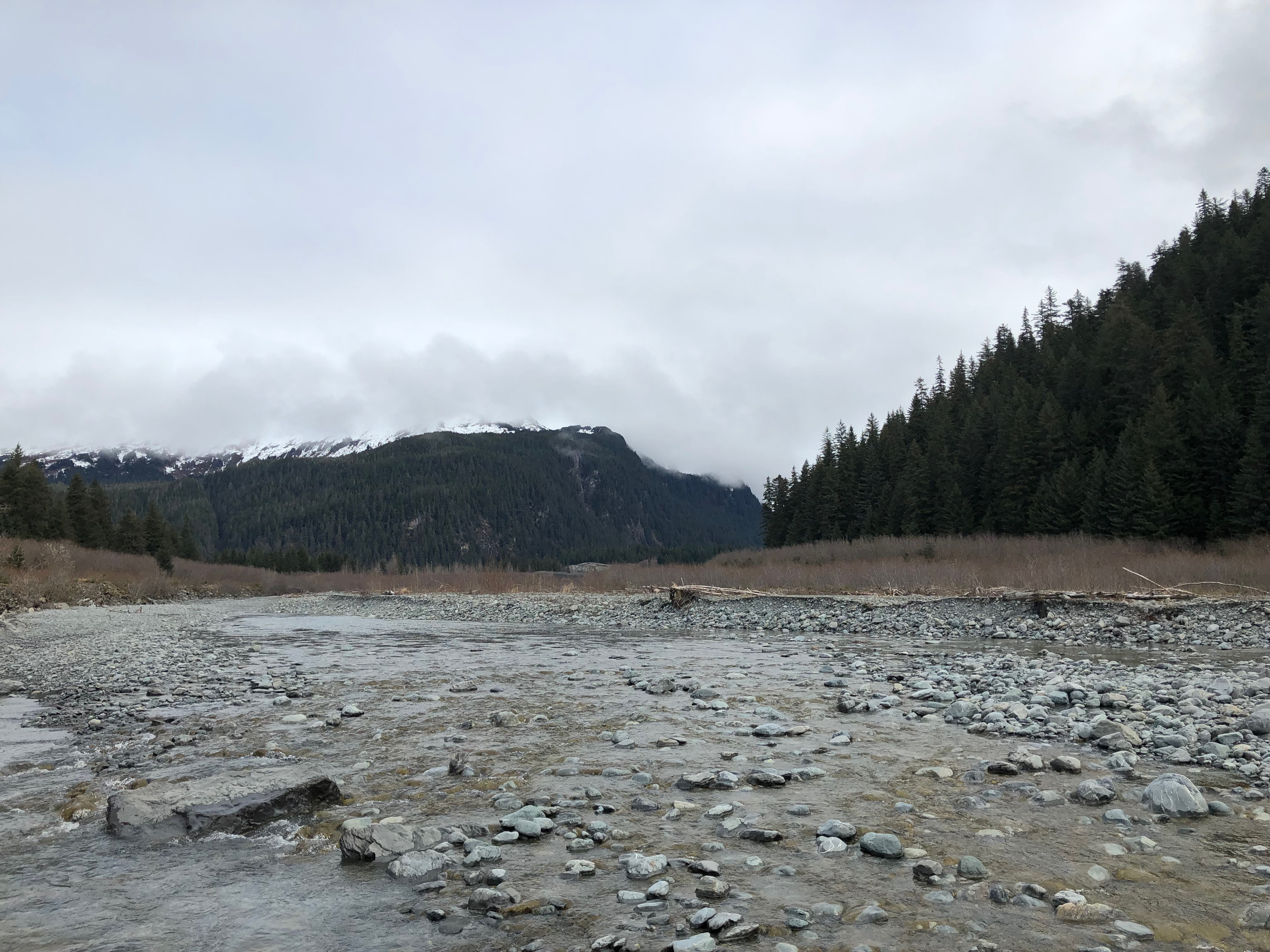

- Location of the mouth of the Fourth of July Creek within Alaska

Location
- Country: United States
- State: Alaska
- City: Seward, Alaska

Physical characteristics
- Source: Numerous small glaciers
- Mouth: Resurrection Bay
  - location: Seward
  - coordinates: 60.080°N 149.344°W
  - elevation: 0 m (0 ft)
- Length: 5 mi (8.0 km)
- Discharge
  - location: mouth

Basin features
- Tributaries
  - right: Godwin Creek

The Fourth of July Creek is a creek on the Kenai Peninsula in Alaska. It rises on the upper Resurrection Peninsula from various glaciers on Santa Ana Peak in the Chugach Mountains and flows 5 miles (8.0 km) to empty into Resurrection Bay near Seward. Fourth of July Creek formed some time after 1850, when Godwin Glacier retreated from the shores of Resurrection Bay, uncovering the stream and the broad valley it flows through. The creek was formerly known as the Godwin River, before the aforementioned glacier split into two valleys creating a separate tributary of the waterway, today known as Godwin Creek.

== Fishing and recreation ==
Fishing for salmon is not permitted in the Fourth of July Creek. However, its delta remains a popular fishing spot, as Resurrection Bay has a very productive silver salmon fishery. This delta is at a rocky and sandy coastal area known as Fourth of July Beach, and is publicly accessible by going around the adjacent shipyard's private property.
