= Rugged Island =

Rugged Island may refer to:

- Rugged Island (Alaska)
- Rugged Island (South Shetland Islands)
- Rugged Island, a small volcanic island of the Zubair Group, in Yemen
- Rugged Island parish, fictional Irish parish in the Father Ted series
