= Seward Silver Salmon Derby =

Fishing tournament in Alaska, US

Started in 1956, the Seward Silver Salmon Derby is Alaska’s second oldest fishing derby after Valdez Fish Derbies started in 1952. The derby generally opens the second week in August. Participants compete to bring in the largest coho salmon, also known as silver salmon. The fish are weighed and turned in daily.

== Prize categories ==
- Tagged Fish: Fish are caught and tagged before the start of the derby. The prize for catching a tagged fish can earn up to $50,000. Catching a tagged fish is somewhat rare.
- Largest Fish: The largest 25 fish caught bring in various prizes, with the largest bringing in a prize of up to $10,000 and the weight of the fish in coffee.
- There are a number of other awards that can be earned in the derby including: First fish caught, last fish caught, top weighted mystery fish (non-silvers caught during the derby), largest fish caught on a sailboat, largest fish caught from shore, cumulative weight caught by a non-Seward resident, cumulative weight caught by a Seward resident, and the top three heaviest fish caught by youth.
