= Resurrection Peninsula =

Coordinates: 59.992°N 149.260°W

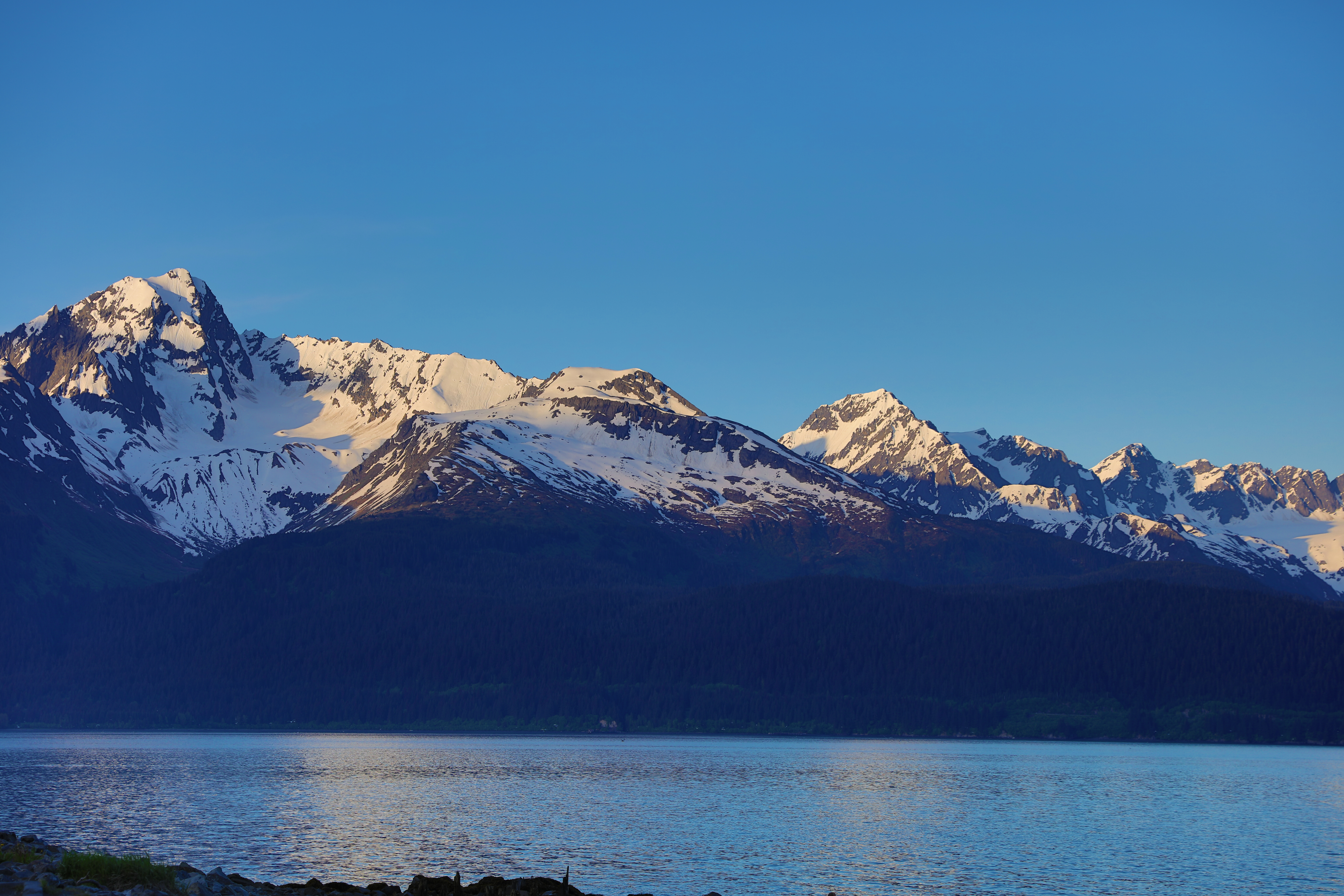
The Resurrection Peninsula Mountains as seen from Seward

Resurrection Peninsula is a peninsula on the larger Kenai Peninsula of the U.S. state of Alaska, which lies roughly 8 miles southeast of Seward. It contains very rugged geography, with very little flat land existing between sheer peaks and the deep inlets of Resurrection Bay to the west, and Day Harbor to the east. Due to the geographical nature of the peninsula, it is uninhabited, although numerous cabins, state parks, and general private in holdings exist. All land here is accessible by boat only. There is no concrete measurement of the exact of the landmass, however, the Alaska Department of Fish and Game has a management area which encompasses the landmass as well as lands that are not usually considered part of a peninsula. The land which better fits the definition is roughly 10 miles long, running from near Thumb Cove and Talus Bay to Cape Resurrection at its southern extremity. Slightly less than half of the land on the Resurrection Peninsula is part of the Chugach National Forest's southern terminus.
