= Fox Island (Alaska) =

Island in Alaska

Nickname: Renard Island
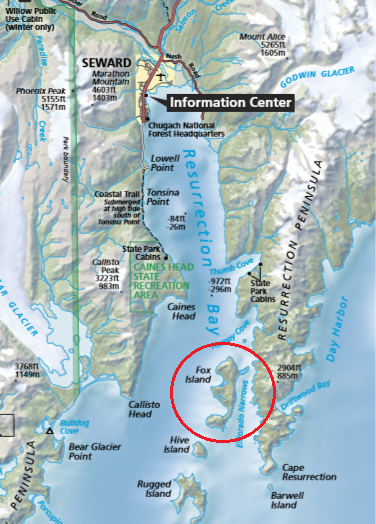

- Location within Alaska

Geography
- Location: Resurrection Bay, Pacific Ocean
- Coordinates: 59°55′18″N 149°20′09″W
- Archipelago: Resurrection Archipelago
- Highest elevation: 1,479 ft (450.8 m)
- Highest point: Unnamed

Administration
- United States
- State: Alaska
- Borough: Kenai Peninsula

Fox Island, also known as Renard Island, is an island in Resurrection Bay near Seward in the U.S. state of Alaska. The island is 3.4 miles long, two miles wide, and is primarily mountainous, consisting of 3 peaks and the saddles between them. On its east side, the remnants of a glacial moraine have created a spit. Fox Island is a popular destination for kayaking, camping, and hiking in the summer, and hosts two resorts on its shores. In addition, the island contains two state parks, Sandspit Point State Marine Park, and Sunny Cove State Marine Park.

== History ==
In the early to mid 20th century, Fox Island was home to fox farming, which shaped the area, and gave the island its name. This practice continued into the 1960s, and was gradually phased out as farmers sold their land.

In July 1918, American artist Rockwell Kent left New York City for Alaska with his eight-year-old son. After a brief stay at Yakutat, the two traveled by steamship to Seward on Resurrection Bay. On August 28, 1918 while exploring the bay in small dory, Kent and his son met Lars Matt Olson, a 71-year-old Swede and Alaskan sourdough who operated a fox farm and goat ranch on Fox Island. Businessman Thomas W. Hawkins of Brown and Hawkins Mercantile in Seward financed the business and Olson ran it. Olson showed them his island and offered the Kents a former goat shed as a shelter for the winter. Kent had studied architecture at Columbia University and was an excellent carpenter. He repaired the cabin, chinked the spaces between the logs, put in a large south-facing window for light, and—with some financial help from Hawkins—put in a floor, stoves, and everything they would need for the winter. Kent's son, also called Rockwell turned nine-years-old in October, and the two spent the winter on Fox Island with Olson, going to and from Seward on occasion to get the mail and supplies in a leaky, 18-foot dory with a finicky 3.5 horsepower Evinrude engine. Kent kept an illustrated journal, painted, produced many black and white pen and inks, and wrote hundreds of letters. Upon his return to New York at the end of March 1919, he had a successful show of his pen and inks, and got a contract to publish his illustrated journal. His Alaska paintings had a show in March 1920 to coincide with the publication of his book — "Wilderness: A Journal of Quiet Adventure in Alaska". At age 37, both the book and the art finally gave Rockwell Kent the fame and financial independence he had been seeking for many years. In 1970, a year before he died, Kent published an expanded limited edition of "Wilderness" with much new material added from the original manuscript. In 1996, Wesleyan University Press reprinted that edition with a foreword by Alaska writer and historian, Doug Capra. For the 100th anniversary of Kent's visit to Alaska, Capra has written a book about that experience, revealing the "not-so-quiet" adventure found in the revealing and sometimes disturbing correspondence between Kent and his wife, Kathleen, and Kent and his other love, Hildegarde Hirsch. Capra has also put this adventure into a historical and cultural context with an Alaskan focus. You can find the first entry of this book's draft at the Rockwell Kent Wilderness Centennial Journal.
