= Rugged Island (Alaska) =

Island in Alaska

- Interactive map of Rugged Island

Geography
- Location: Resurrection Bay, Pacific Ocean
- Coordinates: 59.857°N 149.381°W
- Archipelago: Resurrection Archipelago
- Highest elevation: 1,436 ft (437.7 m)
- Highest point: Unnamed

Administration
- United States
- State: Alaska
- Borough: Kenai Peninsula

Demographics
- Population: 0

Rugged Island is a barrier island at the mouth of Resurrection Bay near Seward in the U.S. state of Alaska. The island is 2.4 miles (3.9 km) long, 1.7 miles (2.7 km) wide, and is primarily mountainous, consisting of mostly steep hills, peaks and vertical cliffs. The island's curved shape wraps three quarters of the way around Rugged Island's only anchorage, a central inlet known as Mary's Bay. Rugged Island is a popular destination for kayaking, sailing, camping, and guided hikes to the abandoned fort on its shores in the summer.

== History ==
The island was largely uninhabited until 1942. During World War II, the United States Army built a pair of forts, Fort McGilvray on Caines Head, and Fort Bulkley on the southern tip of Rugged Island. A jeep access road from Mary's Bay to the fort, searchlights, fire control stations, a large gun battery, and a radar installation were also constructed. At its peak, Fort Bulkley was home to 80 men. In 1944, with the war winding down, the fort was abandoned. The remains of the fort and dock can still be seen to this day.
