= Resurrection River =

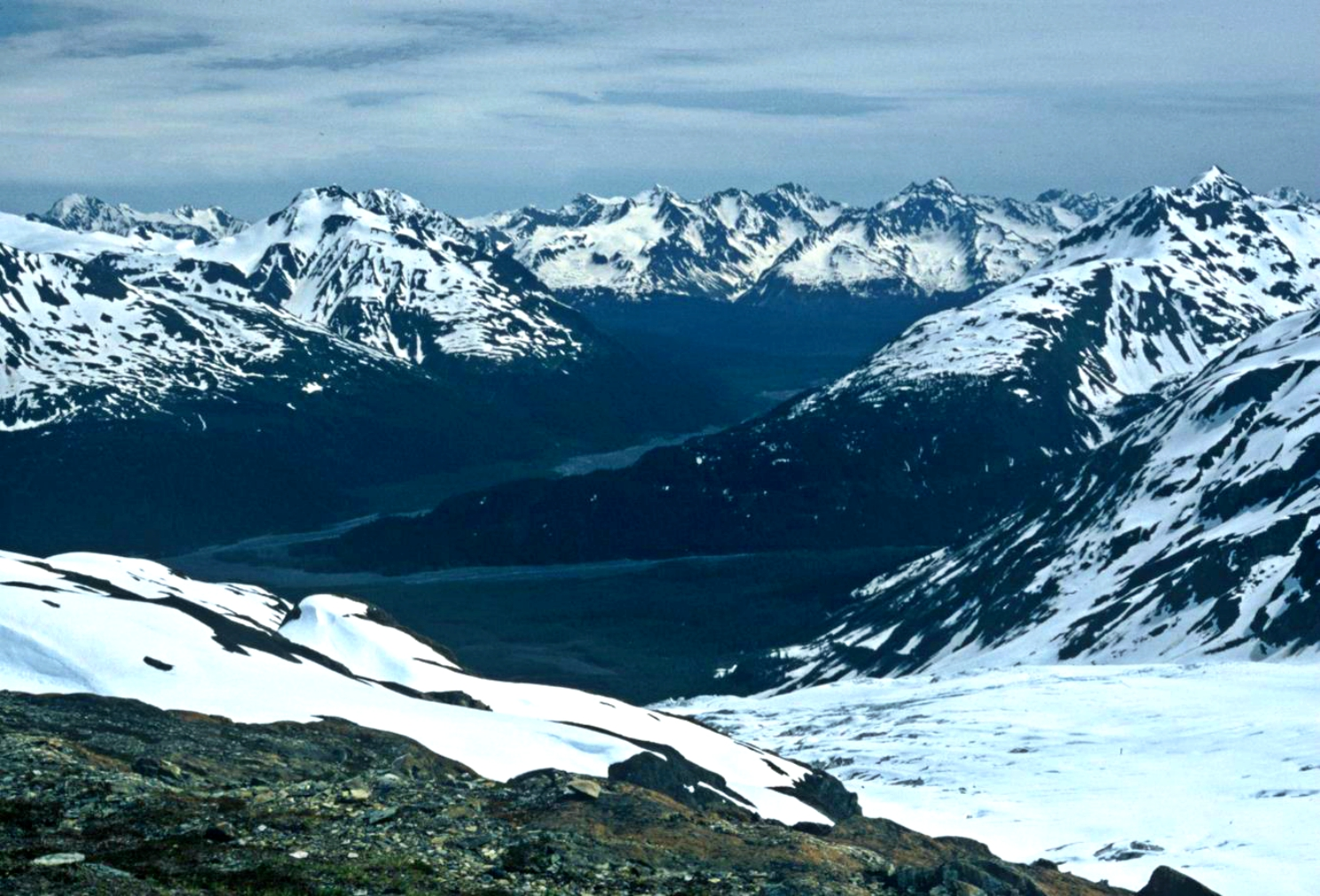
- The river valley seen from the edge of the Harding Icefield

- Location of the mouth of the Resurrection River in Alaska

Location
- Country: United States
- State: Alaska
- City: Seward, Alaska

Physical characteristics
- Source: Near Upper Russian Lake
- Mouth: Resurrection Bay
  - location: Seward
  - coordinates: 60°07′20″N 149°23′55″W
  - elevation: 0 m (0 ft)
- Length: 22 mi (35 km)
- Discharge
  - location: mouth

Basin features
- Tributaries
  - left: Boulder Creek, Martin Creek, Box Canyon Creek, Salmon Creek
  - right: Summit Creek, Placer Creek, Exit Glacier Floodplain, Paradise Creek

The Resurrection River is a large river on the Kenai Peninsula in Alaska. It rises near Upper Russian Lake in the Kenai Mountains and flows 22 miles (35 km) to empty into Resurrection Bay near Seward. Part of the river passes through Kenai Fjords National Park. There has been small-scale placer mining for gold at the confluence of the river and Placer Creek.

== Fishing ==
Fishing for salmon is permitted in the lower Resurrection River. The river and bay it drains into have a very productive silver salmon fishery which peaks in August. Other notable fisheries in the river include minor runs of Chinook salmon and Sockeye salmon.
