= Resurrection Bay =

Fjord in the Kenai Peninsula, Alaska, U.S.

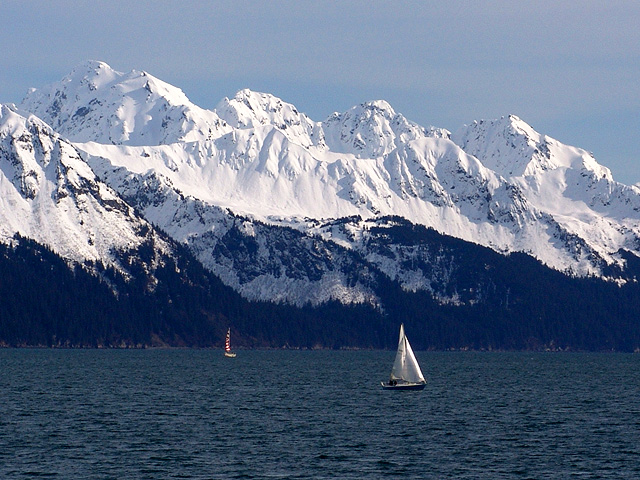
- Sailboats on Resurrection Bay

- Location within Alaska
- Location: Kenai Peninsula, Alaska
- Coordinates: 59.970°N 149.381°W
- Primary inflows: Resurrection River, Fourth of July Creek, Likes Creek
- Basin countries: United States
- Max. length: 18 mi (29 km)
- Max. width: 5 mi (8.0 km)
- Average depth: 500 ft (150 m)
- Max. depth: 972 ft (296 m)
- Frozen: Never
- Islands: Fox Island, Rugged Island, Hat Island, Hive Island, Barwell Island, Cheval Island
- Sections/sub-basins: Derby Cove, Thumb Cove, Humpy Cove, Halibut Cove, Sunny Cove, Bulldog Cove, Mary's Bay, Porcupine Cove, Agnes Cove, Pony Cove
- Settlements: Seward, Lowell Point

View of Resurrection Bay from Miller's Landing

Resurrection Bay, also known as Blying Sound, and Harding Gateway in its outer reaches, is a fjord on the Kenai Peninsula of Alaska, United States. Its main settlement is Seward, located at the head of the bay. The bay received its name from Alexandr Baranov, who was forced to retreat into the bay during a bad storm in the Gulf of Alaska. When the storm settled it was Easter Sunday, so the bay and nearby Resurrection River were named in honor of it. Harding Gateway refers to the passage between Rugged and Cheval Islands.

Resurrection Bay is the location of Caines Head, at the summit of which Fort McGilvray is situated 650 feet (200 meters) above sea level. This fortification was constructed by the United States Armed Forces to defend against a possible invasion by the Imperial Japanese Army during World War II. The bay remains ice-free even in winter, making it easily navigable.

It is called the "gateway to the Kenai Fjords" as many water taxis, kayak tours, anglers, and recreational boaters use the bay to access nearby Kenai Fjords National Park.

== Geography ==
Resurrection Bay has a maximum depth of 972 feet (296 m), near the coast at Caines Head. It contains many deep coves, most notably Thumb, Humpy, Bulldog, Pony and Derby Coves. To the west, Resurrection Bay is bordered by the Aialik Peninsula and the adjacent Aialik Bay. To the east, the bay is bounded by the Resurrection Peninsula and Day Harbor.

== Parks ==
Several parks are located in and around the bay. Kenai Fjords National Park is primarily accessed by boat from Seward. Caines Head State Recreation Area is here. Many visit it by boat, but there is a trail from Lowell Point State Recreation Site, a 19-acre (7.7 ha) park with beach access and trailhead parking. Parts of the trail between the two parks are only accessible at low tide, so visitors must plan accordingly. Sandspit Point State Marine Park is a 1,135-acre (459 ha) undeveloped park, popular with kayakers, with beach camping and tidepooling. Sunny Cove State Marine Park is a 960-acre (390 ha) park on Fox Island. It is also undeveloped and has no source of fresh water. The park consists of a beach area used for camping and landing of small boats, and steep, rocky cliffs. Thumb Cove State Marine Park is one of the few developed parks in the area, featuring offshore mooring buoys for small boats, beach camping, and two public-use cabins. Visitors can view Porcupine Glacier, Spoon Glacier, and Prospect Glacier from the park.
