= Day Harbor =

- Location within Alaska
- Location: Kenai Peninsula, Alaska
- Coordinates: 59.99°N 149.15°W
- Primary inflows: Ellsworth River, Bootleg River, Selenite River, Talus Creek
- Basin countries: United States
- Max. length: 13.5 mi (21.7 km)
- Max. width: 5 mi (8.0 km)
- Average depth: 500 ft (150 m)
- Max. depth: 666 ft (203 m)
- Islands: 1
- Sections/sub-basins: Driftwood Bay, Killer Bay, Safety Cove, Talus Bay, Anchor Cove, Bowen Anchorage

Day Harbor is a bay on the Kenai Peninsula of Alaska, United States. It received its name in 1787 from Captain Portlock, because travel to the head of the bay from Seward typically takes 12 hours. The bay is 25 miles from Seward, and is accessible only by boat. It is a gently curving J-shaped bay separated on the west from nearby Resurrection Bay by the Resurrection Peninsula. Recreational boaters often anchor at one of the two State Marine Parks due to the often choppy seas and unstable weather of outer Day Harbor. Lesser used anchorages on the eastern shore include Anchor Cove and Bowen Anchorage. Popular activities in the bay include hiking to Ellsworth Lake at the head of the bay where the retreating Ellsworth Glacier calves.

The majority of the land surrounding Day Harbor is private, with over 400 different properties.

== Parks ==
The bay is home to two Alaska State Parks. Driftwood Bay State Marine Park is 1,480 acres (600 ha) of undeveloped wilderness. The primary activity in the park is boating for either fishing or sightseeing purposes. It is mostly a day-use park due to the lack of any facilities on shore. Safety Cove State Marine Park is 960 acres (390 ha), including waters in the bay. It is also undeveloped but offers a good spot for beach camping, a small freshwater lake, and access to the high country of the Resurrection Peninsula.
