= Seward, Alaska =

City in Alaska, United States

- City
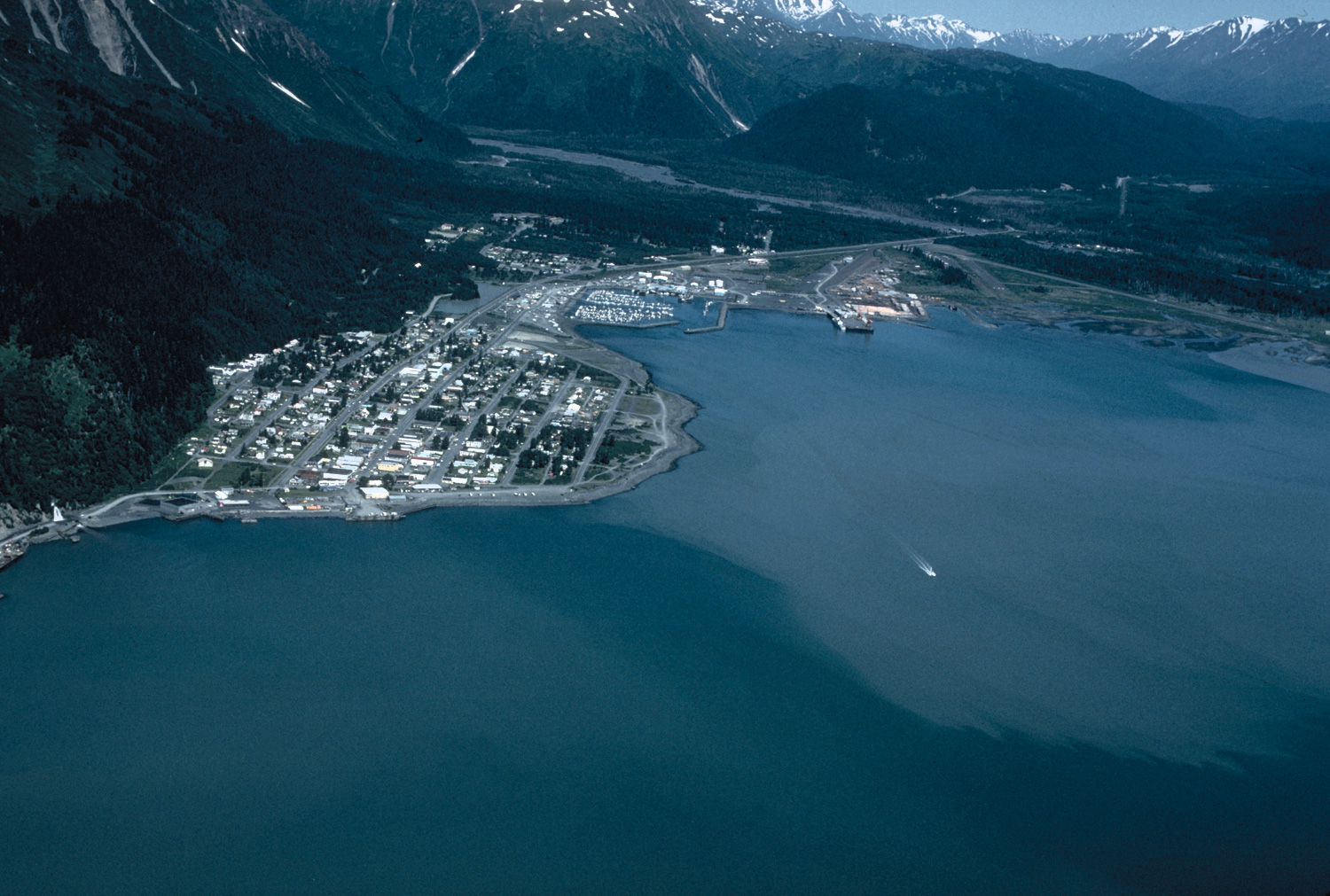
- Aerial view of Seward

- Flag Seal
- Nickname: "Gateway to the Kenai Fjords"
- Motto: "Alaska Starts Here"
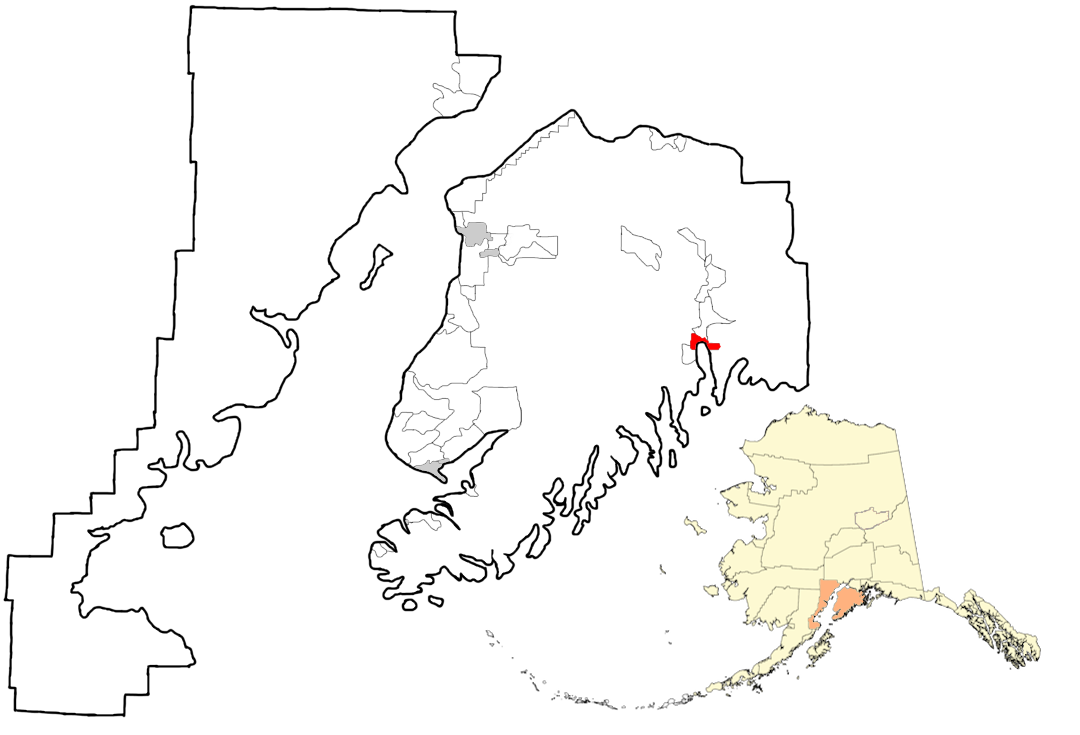
- Location in Kenai Peninsula Borough, Alaska
- Coordinates: 60°07′28″N 149°26′00″W
- Country: United States
- State: Alaska
- Borough: Kenai Peninsula
- Established: 1903
- Incorporated: June 1, 1912

Government
  - Type: Council-manager
  - Mayor: Sue McClure
  - State senator: Gary Stevens (R)
  - State rep.: Louise Stutes (R)

Area
  - Total: 21.89 sq mi (56.69 km^{2})
  - Land: 13.96 sq mi (36.16 km^{2})
  - Water: 7.93 sq mi (20.54 km^{2})
- Elevation: 0 ft (0 m)

Population (2020)
  - Total: 2,717
  - Density: 194.6/sq mi (75.15/km^{2})
- Time zone: UTC−9 (Alaska)
  - Summer (DST): UTC−8 (Alaska)
- ZIP code: 99664
- Area code: 907
- FIPS code: 02-68560
- GNIS feature ID: 1414598
- Website: www.cityofseward.us
- Source of coordinates

Seward (Alutiiq: Qutalleq; Dena'ina: Tl'ubugh) is an incorporated home rule city in Alaska, United States. Located on Resurrection Bay, a fjord of the Gulf of Alaska on the Kenai Peninsula, Seward is situated on Alaska's southern coast, approximately 120 miles (190 km) by road from Alaska's largest city, Anchorage.

With a population of 2,717 people as of the 2020 census, Seward is the fourth-largest city in the Kenai Peninsula Borough, behind Kenai, Homer, and the borough seat of Soldotna. The city is named for former United States Secretary of State William H. Seward, who orchestrated the United States' purchase of Alaska from the Russian Empire in 1867 while serving in this position as part of President Andrew Johnson's administration.

Seward is the southern terminus of the Alaska Railroad and the historic starting point of the original Iditarod Trail to Interior Alaska, with Mile 0 of the trail marked on the shoreline at the southern end of town.

In 2015, President Barack Obama visited Seward, first stopping at Exit Glacier to discuss the visible impacts of climate change with Bear Grylls. Obama characterized Exit Glacier's receding edge as, "...as good a signpost of what we're dealing with when it comes to climate change as just about anything... We want to make sure that our grandkids can see this." He also toured Downtown Seward, visiting a local ice cream shop, and explored Resurrection Bay and Bear Glacier from the water aboard the Viewfinder, which launched from Seward Harbor.

== History ==
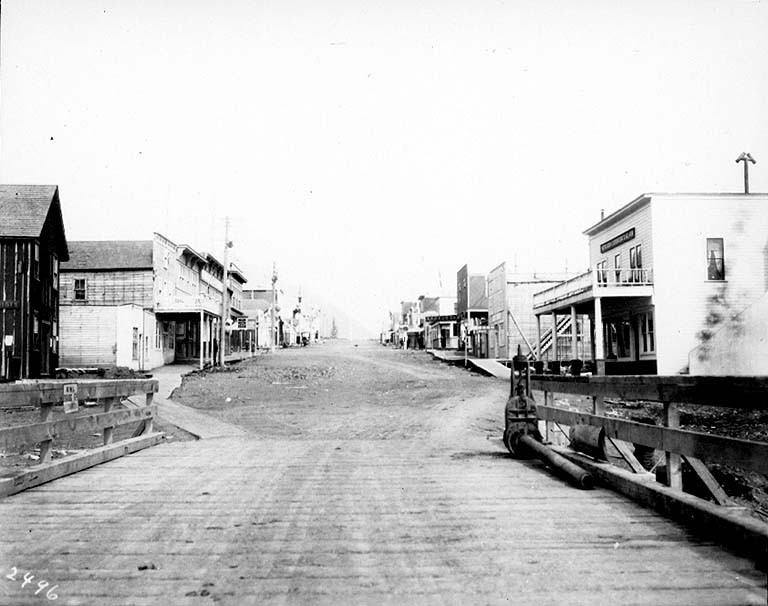
Fourth Avenue, August 1907

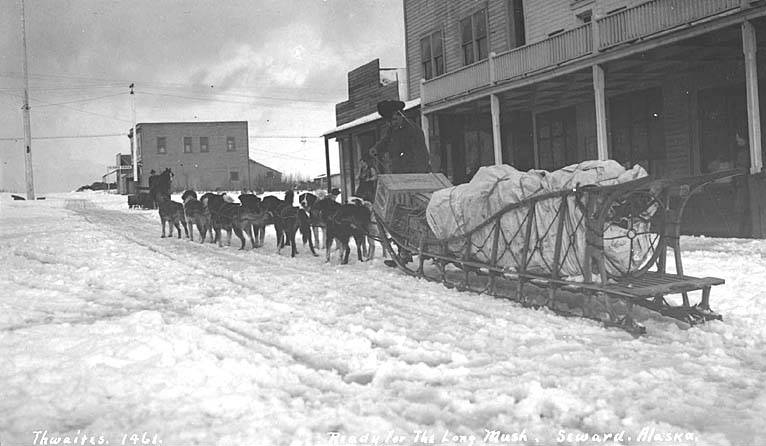
caption reads "Ready for The Long Mush, Seward, Alaska" (click photo for further information) ca 1914

In 1793, Alexander Baranov of the Shelikhov-Golikov company (precursor of the Russian-American Company) established a fur trade post on Resurrection Bay where Seward is today and had a three-masted vessel, the Phoenix, built at the post by James Shields, an English shipwright in Russian service.

The 1939 Slattery Report on Alaskan development identified the region as one of the areas where new settlements would be established through Jewish immigration. This plan was never implemented.

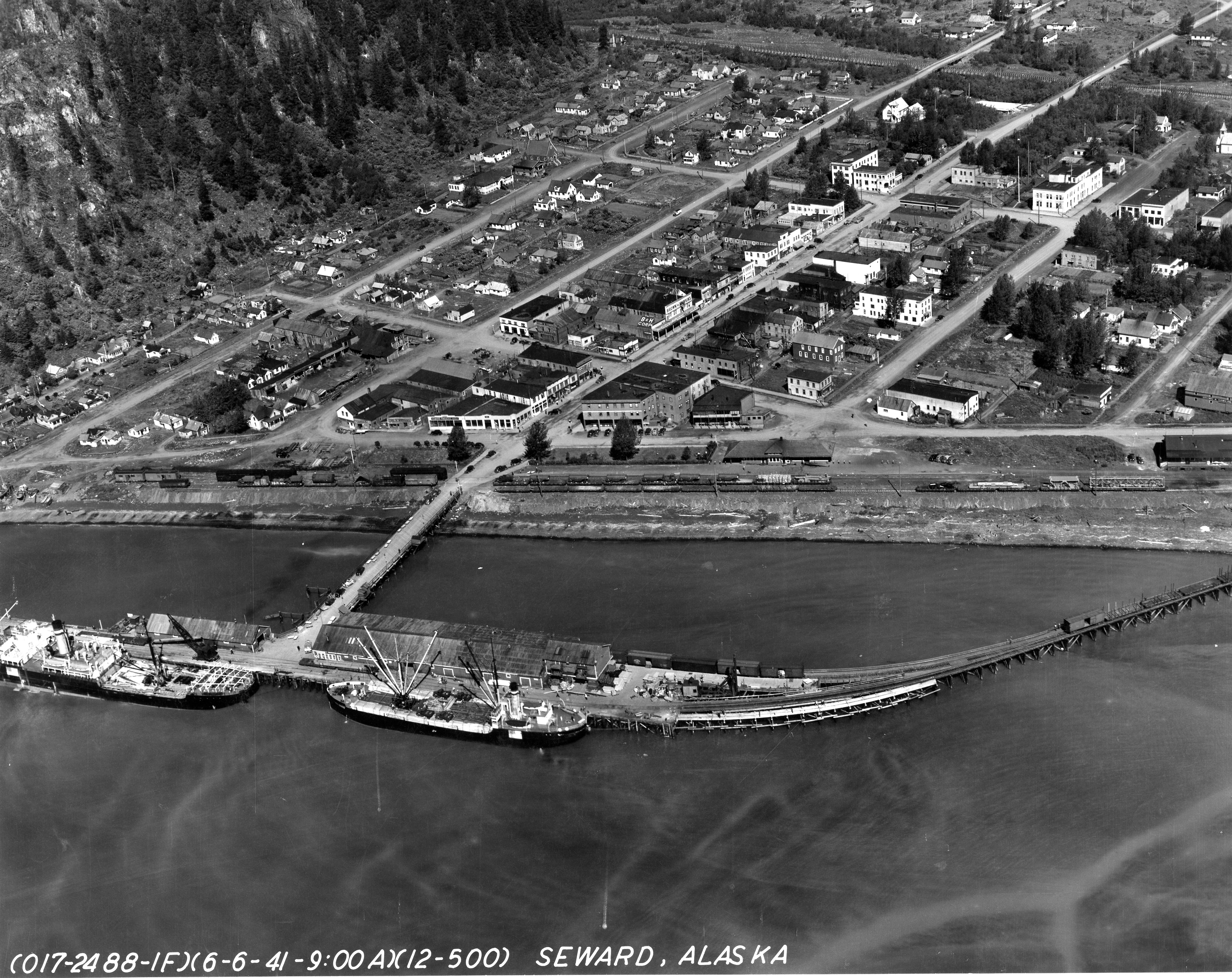
Port of Seward, 1940s

Seward was an important port for the military buildup in Alaska during World War II. Fort Raymond was established in Seward along the Resurrection River to protect the community. An Army airfield built in Seward during the war later became Walseth Air Force Base. Both of the military facilities were closed shortly after the end of the war.

A large portion of Seward was damaged by shaking and a local tsunami during the 1964 Alaska earthquake, destroying all evidence of one radio station.

Seward borders the Kenai Fjords National Park, which was granted national park status in 1980 to protect the glaciers of the Harding Icefield.

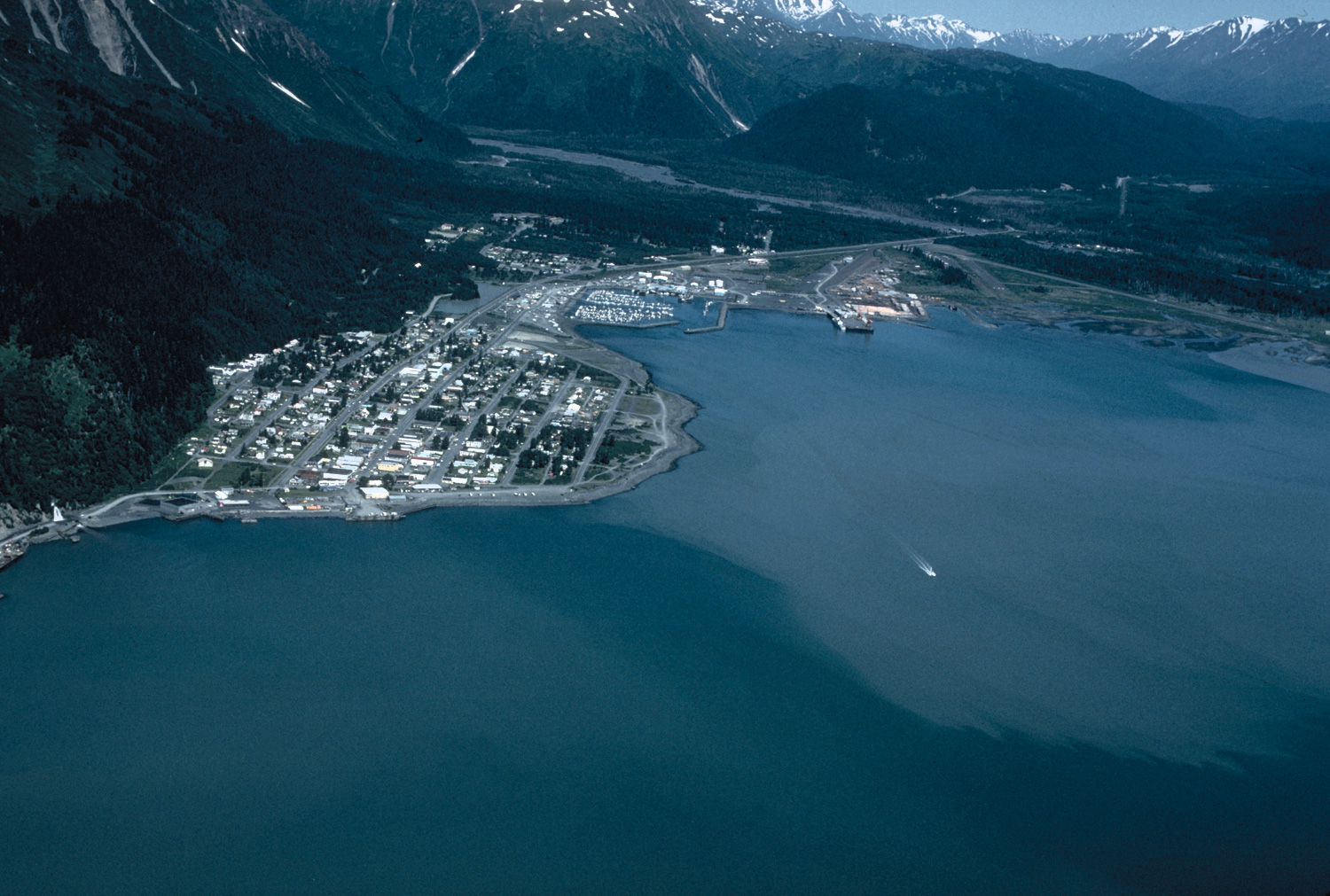
Aerial view of Seward, Alaska, in the 1990s, looking north. The mouth of the Resurrection River and the base of Mount Marathon are visible.

According to the United States Census Bureau, the city has a total area of 21.5 square miles (56 km^{2}), of which 14.4 square miles (37 km^{2}) is land and 7.1 square miles (18 km^{2}) (32.93%) is water.

The northern city limits are demarcated by the lower reaches of the Resurrection River, but extend east past the river's mouth at the northern end of Resurrection Bay to include parts of the bay's extreme northeastern shore, including the beach at the mouth of Fourth of July Creek and the grounds of Spring Creek Correctional Center just inland. To the south, the city limits extend to the unincorporated community of Lowell Point, while the east and west sides of the city are constrained by Resurrection Bay and the steep slopes of Mount Marathon.

Nearby settlements include the aforementioned Lowell Point to the south, as well as the census-designated places of Bear Creek and Moose Pass further north. The nearest incorporated city is Soldotna, about 90 miles (by road) to the northwest.

=== Climate ===
Depending on the isotherm, Seward has a subpolar oceanic climate (Köppen Cfc) or a subarctic climate (Köppen Dfc), but it experiences relatively moderate temperatures compared to the rest of the state throughout the year due to the influence of the nearby Gulf of Alaska. Only one month, January, sees an average daily high temperature below freezing, and temperatures below zero degrees Fahrenheit are rare. The oceanic influence also imparts a high level of precipitation, with the heaviest amounts occurring during the fall and winter months.

Climate data for Seward, Alaska (Seward Airport), 1991–2020 normals, extremes 1997–present
Month	Jan	Feb	Mar	Apr	May	Jun	Jul	Aug	Sep	Oct	Nov	Dec	Year
Record high °F (°C)	61 (16)	50 (10)	57 (14)	74 (23)	80 (27)	88 (31)	87 (31)	86 (30)	76 (24)	62 (17)	54 (12)	52 (11)	88 (31)
Mean maximum °F (°C)	44.6 (7.0)	44.5 (6.9)	47.7 (8.7)	56.3 (13.5)	69.3 (20.7)	74.0 (23.3)	78.1 (25.6)	73.6 (23.1)	67.7 (19.8)	55.6 (13.1)	47.0 (8.3)	44.8 (7.1)	79.9 (26.6)
Mean daily maximum °F (°C)	31.3 (−0.4)	34.3 (1.3)	37.3 (2.9)	45.4 (7.4)	53.4 (11.9)	59.0 (15.0)	62.2 (16.8)	62.0 (16.7)	55.7 (13.2)	45.7 (7.6)	36.1 (2.3)	33.2 (0.7)	46.3 (8.0)
Daily mean °F (°C)	26.2 (−3.2)	28.9 (−1.7)	31.1 (−0.5)	38.8 (3.8)	46.3 (7.9)	52.3 (11.3)	56.2 (13.4)	55.8 (13.2)	49.6 (9.8)	40.2 (4.6)	31.4 (−0.3)	28.2 (−2.1)	40.4 (4.7)
Mean daily minimum °F (°C)	21.1 (−6.1)	23.5 (−4.7)	24.9 (−3.9)	32.2 (0.1)	39.2 (4.0)	45.7 (7.6)	50.2 (10.1)	49.6 (9.8)	43.4 (6.3)	34.7 (1.5)	26.6 (−3.0)	23.2 (−4.9)	34.5 (1.4)
Mean minimum °F (°C)	4.7 (−15.2)	8.1 (−13.3)	11.7 (−11.3)	21.8 (−5.7)	31.2 (−0.4)	37.7 (3.2)	43.3 (6.3)	42.7 (5.9)	34.9 (1.6)	25.7 (−3.5)	14.5 (−9.7)	9.1 (−12.7)	1.6 (−16.9)
Record low °F (°C)	−6 (−21)	−15 (−26)	2 (−17)	10 (−12)	28 (−2)	35 (2)	39 (4)	38 (3)	29 (−2)	15 (−9)	5 (−15)	−1 (−18)	−15 (−26)
Average precipitation inches (mm)	6.47 (164)	6.35 (161)	3.85 (98)	4.29 (109)	3.50 (89)	2.34 (59)	3.11 (79)	5.39 (137)	9.90 (251)	8.69 (221)	7.60 (193)	8.22 (209)	69.71 (1,770)
Average snowfall inches (cm)	12.9 (33)	12.6 (32)	10.5 (27)	3.7 (9.4)	0.3 (0.76)	0.0 (0.0)	0.0 (0.0)	0.0 (0.0)	0.0 (0.0)	0.5 (1.3)	8.2 (21)	15.7 (40)	64.4 (164.46)
Average precipitation days (≥ 0.01 in)	13.6	13.8	12.4	14.2	13.5	11.1	13.4	15.2	17.1	16.6	14.0	15.9	170.8
Average snowy days (≥ 0.1 in)	5.8	5.0	4.7	2.2	0.1	0.0	0.0	0.0	0.0	0.8	3.9	6.7	29.2
Source 1: NOAA (average snowfall/snow days 1981–2010)
Source 2: National Weather Service

== Economy ==
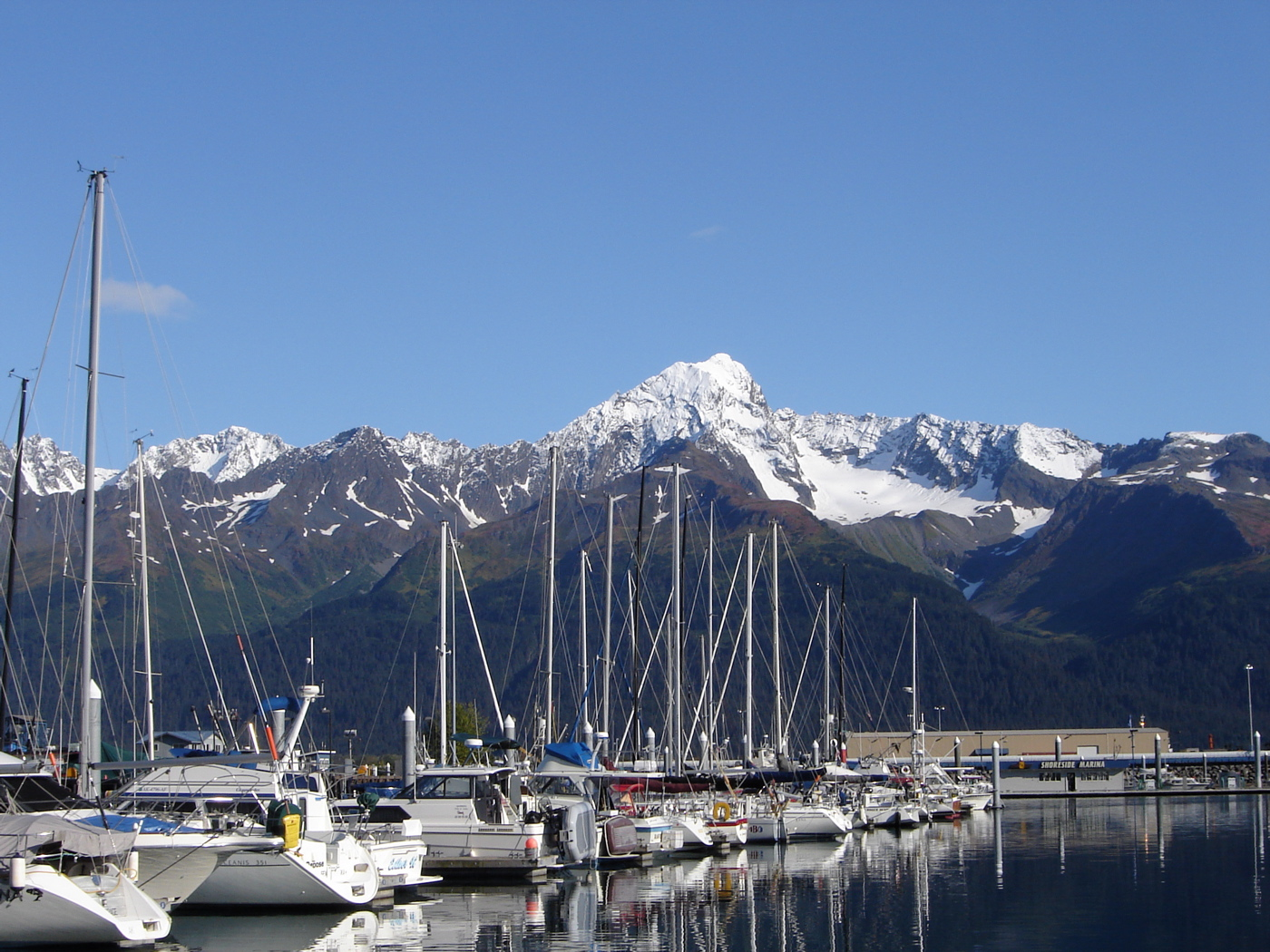
Boats in the harbor, with the snow-capped peak of Mount Alice across the bay to the east in the background

Seward's local economy is largely driven by the commercial fishing industry and seasonal tourism. Many lodging facilities, restaurants and shops in the city cater mainly to tourists, and are only open for business during the summer tourist season, generally regarded as running from mid-May through mid-September. Other major employers in the city include the state-run Spring Creek Correctional Center, the Alaska Department of Labor and Workforce Development's AVTEC vocational school, and the local Providence Health & Services branch, which also serves as the community's main medical center.

=== Fishing ===
Seward is the site of an annual salmon run which, in the 1920s, came to "countless millions" and supported a community of fisherman of mainly Scandinavian origin. It was then the headquarters of the halibut fleet.

Seward is among the most lucrative commercial fisheries ports in the United States, according to reports from the National Marine Fisheries Service. Per the most recent yearly data available, for 2016, commercial fishing boats in Seward offloaded approximately 13,500 tons of fish and shellfish, valued at about $42 million. Over the course of the decade from 2007 to 2016, around $545 million in commercial seafood passed through Seward's harbor.

=== Tourism ===
Owing to its position at the southern terminus of the Alaska Railroad and well-developed road links to Anchorage and the rest of the Kenai Peninsula, Seward is both a major northern end-port for several major cruise ship lines that host Alaskan cruises, such as Norwegian, Royal Caribbean, Holland America, and Celebrity Cruises, and a common destination for general Alaskan tourism. Seward also acts as the gateway community for Kenai Fjords National Park.

Seward also has a minor military installation and was the home port of the USCGC Mustang until 2025.

== Demographics ==
Historical population
Census	Pop.	Note	%±
1910	534		—
1920	652		22.1%
1930	835		28.1%
1940	949		13.7%
1950	2,114		122.8%
1960	1,891		−10.5%
1970	1,587		−16.1%
1980	1,843		16.1%
1990	2,699		46.4%
2000	2,830		4.9%
2010	2,693		−4.8%
2020	2,717		0.9%
U.S. Decennial Census

Seward first appeared on the 1910 U.S. Census as an unincorporated village. It formally incorporated in 1912.

=== 2020 census ===
As of the 2020 census, Seward had a population of 2,717. The median age was 36.8 years. 13.9% of residents were under the age of 18 and 13.5% of residents were 65 years of age or older. For every 100 females there were 161.0 males, and for every 100 females age 18 and over there were 171.5 males age 18 and over.

0.0% of residents lived in urban areas, while 100.0% lived in rural areas.

There were 904 households in Seward, of which 23.0% had children under the age of 18 living in them. Of all households, 37.1% were married-couple households, 25.4% were households with a male householder and no spouse or partner present, and 29.9% were households with a female householder and no spouse or partner present. About 40.7% of all households were made up of individuals and 14.2% had someone living alone who was 65 years of age or older.

There were 1,152 housing units, of which 21.5% were vacant. The homeowner vacancy rate was 0.2% and the rental vacancy rate was 8.9%.

Racial composition as of the 2020 census
Race	Number	Percent
White	1,839	67.7%
Black or African American	110	4.0%
American Indian and Alaska Native	383	14.1%
Asian	51	1.9%
Native Hawaiian and Other Pacific Islander	28	1.0%
Some other race	65	2.4%
Two or more races	241	8.9%
Hispanic or Latino (of any race)	164	6.0%

=== 2000 census ===
As of the census of 2000, there were 2,830 people, 917 households, and 555 families residing in the city. The population density was 196.0 inhabitants per square mile (75.7/km^{2}). There were 1,058 housing units at an average density of 73.3 per square mile (28.3/km^{2}). The racial makeup of the city was 72.1% White, 2.4% Black or African American, 16.7% Native American, 1.8% Asian, 0.2% Pacific Islander, 0.9% from other races, and 5.9% from two or more races. 2.4% of the population were Hispanic or Latino of any race.

There were 917 households, out of which 35.7% had children under the age of 18 living with them, 44.6% were married couples living together, 12.1% had a female householder with no husband present, and 39.4% were non-families. 30.8% of all households were made up of individuals, and 7.1% had someone living alone who was 65 years of age or older. The average household size was 2.40 and the average family size was 3.04.

In the city, the age distribution of the population shows 21.9% under the age of 18, 9.0% from 18 to 24, 35.9% from 25 to 44, 25.7% from 45 to 64, and 7.5% who were 65 years of age or older. The median age was 37 years. For every 100 females, there were 150.2 males. For every 100 females age 18 and over, there were 166.6 males.

The median income for a household in the city was $44,306, and the median income for a family was $54,904. Males had a median income of $36,900 versus $30,508 for females. The per capita income for the city was $20,360. About 8.3% of families and 10.6% of the population were below the poverty line, including 12.7% of those under age 18 and 7.9% of those age 65 or over.

== Government and infrastructure ==
The City of Seward employs a council–manager style of government, with a seven-member city council elected by the citizens, as well as a council-appointed city manager, city attorney and city clerk, responsible for all local administration including police, fire, utilities, and harbor management. At the borough level, Seward is situated in Kenai Peninsula Borough District 6, which has one seat on the nine-member borough council. This council oversees area-wide issues such as education, waste management, zoning and taxation assessment.

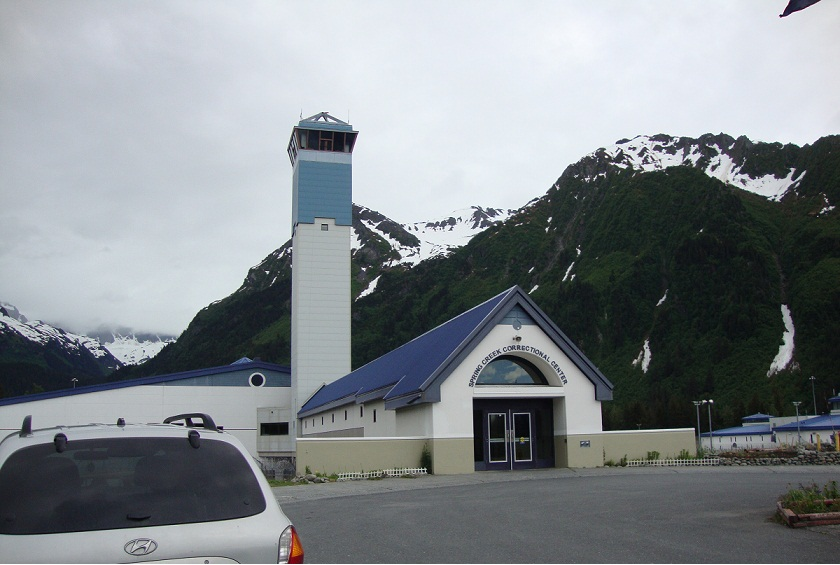
Spring Creek Correctional Center

The United States Postal Service maintains a post office in Seward with zip code 99664.

In the Alaska House of Representatives, the city is in the 29th District, represented by Republican Ben Carpenter.

In the Alaska Senate, the city is in District O, represented by Republican Peter Micciche.

== Education ==
The Kenai Peninsula Borough School District operates schools in Seward, including Seward Elementary School, Seward Middle School, and Seward High School.

== Transportation ==
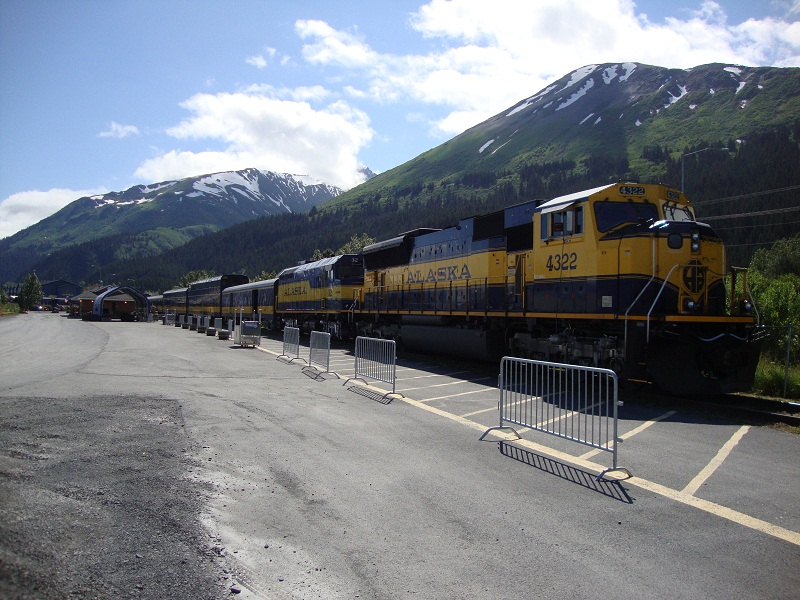
A northbound Alaska Railroad passenger train idles at the Seward depot on June 30, 2010. Race Point on Mount Marathon is the high point on the right-hand side.

Seward is unusual among most small Alaskan communities in that it has road access in the Seward Highway from Seward to Anchorage, a National Scenic Byway and All-American Road, which also brings it bus service. Seward is also the southern terminus of the Alaska Railroad with the railroad serving the Port of Seward which is capable of accommodating ocean going vessels. This keeps the port busy with freight coming on and off the trains, but also makes Seward a primary end point for north-bound cruise ships. Cruise ship passengers disembark and often take the train or bus farther north to Anchorage, Denali, or other Alaskan attractions. The Alaska Railroad operates passenger service into Seward on a seasonal basis via the Coastal Classic train. In 2023, there were 87 cruise ship visits to Seward, bringing nearly 200,000 tourists to the town.

The Alaska Railroad Corporation is planning to build a new cruise ship dock and terminal in Seward. The company signed a 30 year contract in 2024 with cruise ship line Royal Caribbean International, which will provide the revenue necessary to pay off the bonds that will finance the $137 million project. The terminal building will be 60,000 square feet and the floating dock will be 748 feet long and able to accommodate all cruise ships that visit Alaska. Construction is expected to begin in autumn 2025, and the facility is expected to open in 2026.

A paved bike path runs from the downtown business district along the waterfront, through the harbor and along the highway to mile 4.5. Bikes are available for rent and there are guided bike tours of the area.

Alaska Marine Highway (ferry) service was discontinued at the end of the 2005. State ferry connections are now available in Whittier (90 miles North) or Homer (150 miles by highway).

Seward Airport (PAWD/SWD) is home to general aviation services and flight-seeing operators. Scheduled commercial service is available at Kenai Municipal Airport in Kenai and Ted Stevens Anchorage International Airport, both about 100 miles (160 km) away. Bus connections are also available.

== International sister cities ==
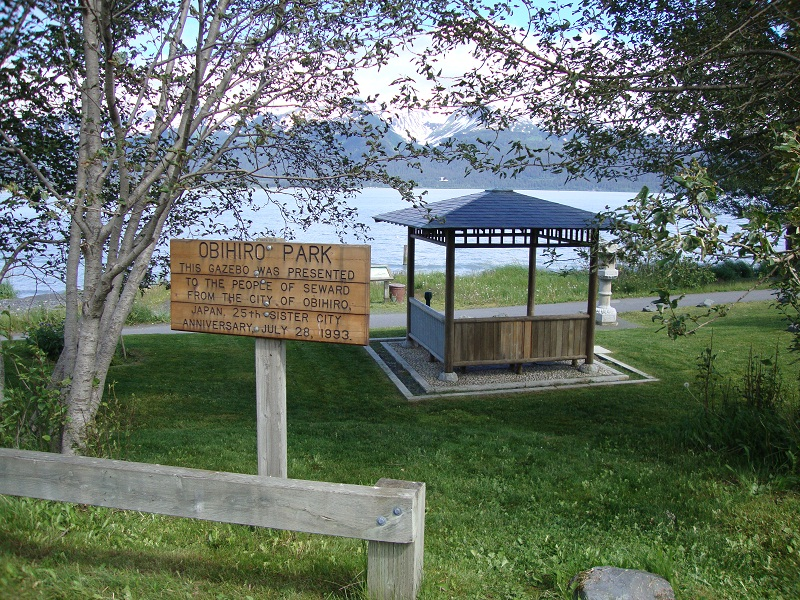
Obihiro Park, with gazebo given to the people of Seward in 1993. Resurrection Bay is in the background.

- Obihiro, Hokkaido, Japan (1968)
- Kushiro, Hokkaido, Japan (1982)
- Yeosu, South Korea (informal)

== Notable people ==
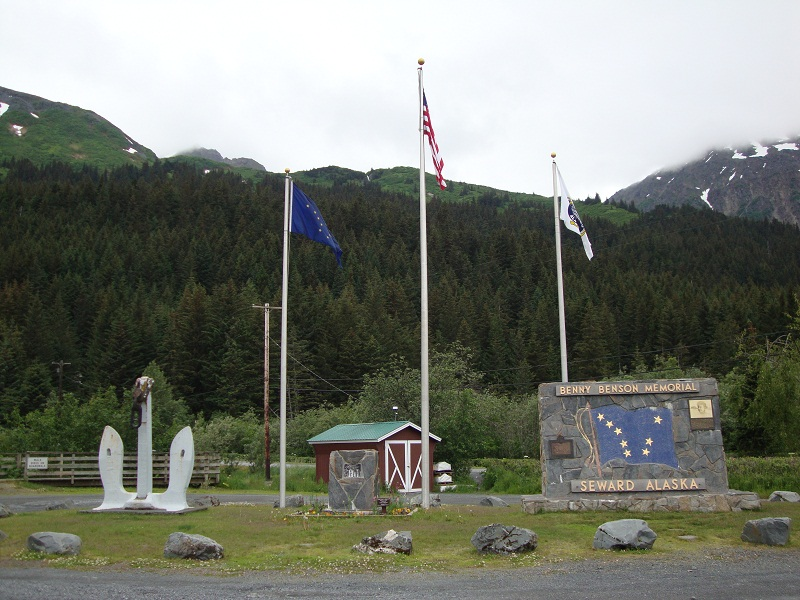
Benny Benson Memorial at Milepost 1.4 of the Seward Highway in Seward, Alaska

- Benny Benson (1913–1972), Alaska Native and designer of what would become the Alaskan state flag
- Chad Bentz (born 1980), former Major League Baseball player
- Lydia Jacoby (born 2004), 2020 Summer Olympics swimming gold medalist and first Alaskan to qualify to compete in swimming at an Olympic Games
- Harry Kawabe (1890–1969), Japanese-American businessman sent to internment camp during World War II

== Attractions and points of interest ==
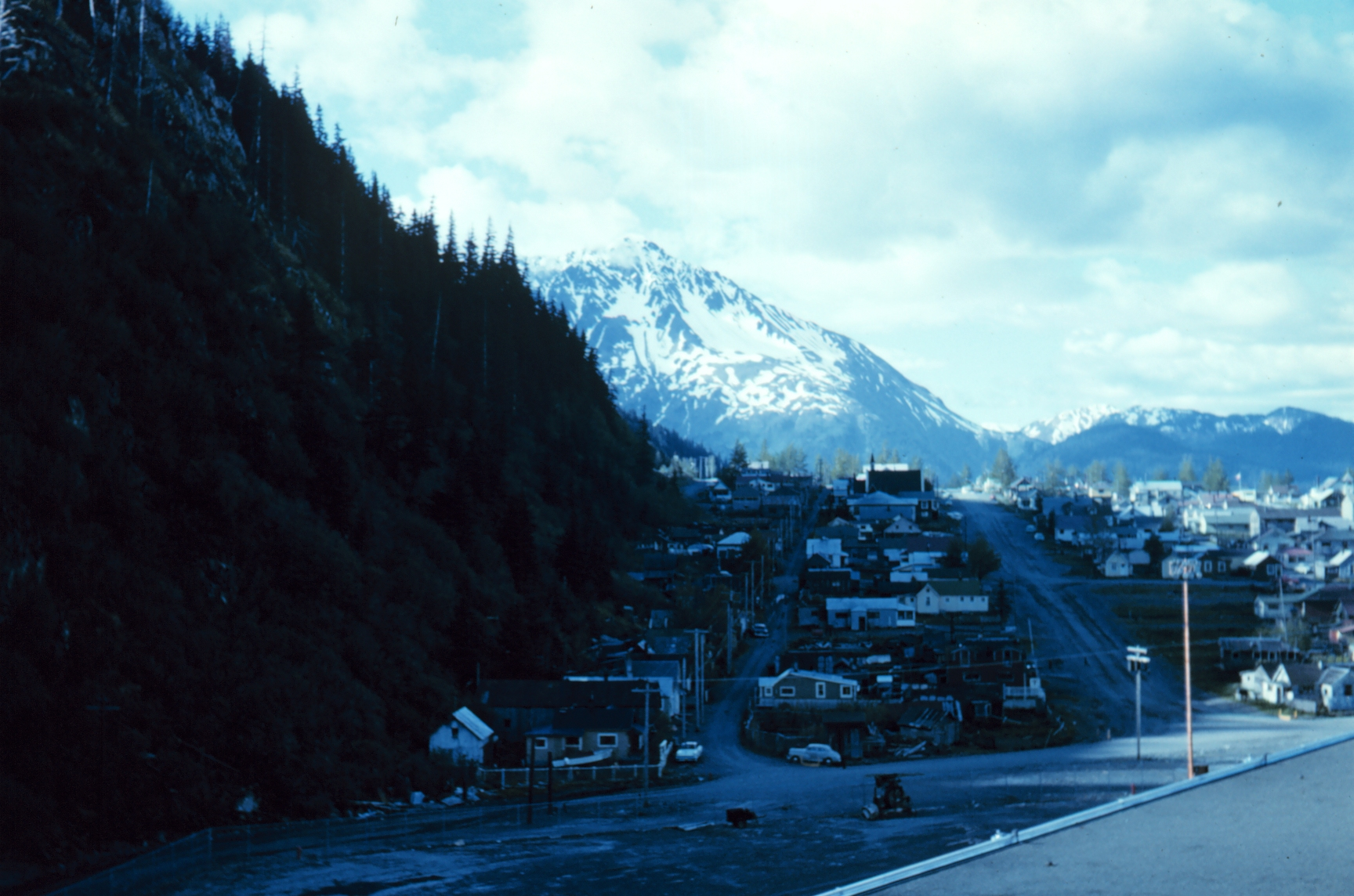
Seward, Alaska, 1959

- Mount Marathon and its famous Mount Marathon Race
- Kenai Fjords National Park with its easily accessible Exit Glacier
- Alaska SeaLife Center
- Seward Historical Museum
- Seward Silver Salmon Derby
- Seward Polar Bear Jump-Off
- Seward Spring Break Up Festival
- Seward Music and Arts Festival, every year in September
- Balto Film Fest, last weekend of July
- The ruins of the Jesse Lee Home for Children
- Boat tours to Holgate Glacier in Kenai Fjords National Park
- Seward lays claim to "The Fat Bike Capital of the World" as it has the most fat-bike owners per capita on Earth.
