= Marymount =

Marymount may refer to:

== Schools ==
- Marymount colleges, a group of colleges around the world founded by the Religious of the Sacred Heart of Mary (RSHM)

=== Australia ===
- Marymount College, Adelaide
- Marymount College, Gold Coast

=== Canada ===
- Marymount Academy (Sudbury), Ontario
- Marymount Academy, Montreal, Quebec

=== Colombia ===
- Marymount International School Barranquilla
- Marymount School Bogota, a school of the Religious of the Sacred Heart of Mary, Bogota
- Marymount School Medellin, a school of the Religious of the Sacred Heart of Mary, Medellin

=== Italy ===
- Marymount International School of Rome
- Istituto Marymount Rome, a school of the Religious of the Sacred Heart of Mary, Rome

=== Hong Kong ===
- Marymount Secondary School
- Marymount Primary School

=== Malawi ===
- Marymount Catholic Secondary School

=== United States ===
- Loyola Marymount University, Los Angeles, California
- Marymount California University, California
- Marymount High School, Los Angeles, California
- Marymount College (Florida), former name of Lynn University
- Marymount College (Kansas), Salina, Kansas
- Marymount School, New York, Manhattan, New York
- Marymount College, Tarrytown, part of Fordham University, New York
- Marymount Manhattan College, Manhattan, New York
- Marymount University, Arlington, Virginia
- Marymount Military Academy, a former school in Parkland, Washington

=== Other places ===
- Marymount International School London, England
- Marymount School, Paris, France
- Marymount High School, Jamaica
- Marymount Cuernavaca, a school of the Religious of the Sacred Heart of Mary, Cuernavaca, Mexico
- Marymount Convent School, Singapore

== Other uses ==
- Marymount, Singapore, a subzone within the town of Bishan, Singapore
- Marymount MRT station, a Mass Rapid Transit station that serves Marymount, Bishan

== See also ==
- Marymount College (disambiguation)
- Mariemont (disambiguation)
- Mary Mount (disambiguation)
- Merrymount (disambiguation)
