= Mount Mary =

Mount Mary may refer to:

- Mount Mary (Alaska), a mountain in Alaska
- Mount Mary, South Australia, a locality in Australia
- Mount Mary Church, Bandra, India
- Mount Mary College, Dimapur, Nagaland, India
- Mount Mary College of Education, a teachers college in Ghana
- Mount Mary University, Milwaukee, Wisconsin, United States

== See also ==
- Mount Mary Austin, California
- Mary Mount (disambiguation)
- Marymount (disambiguation)
- Mount Marcy (disambiguation)
- Mount Maria (disambiguation)
- Mount Mercy (disambiguation)
