= Marymount College =

Marymount College may refer to:

- Marymount College, Gold Coast, a Roman Catholic school located in Gold Coast, Queensland, Australia
- Marymount College, Adelaide, a Roman Catholic school located in Adelaide, South Australia, Australia
- Any of the Marymount colleges formed by the Religious of the Sacred Heart of Mary (RSHM) between 1907 and 1962, including:
  - Marymount Manhattan College, New York City, New York
  - Marymount College, Tarrytown, New York, subsequently a Fordham University graduate campus; now closed
  - Marymount California University (part of the curriculum merged with Loyola University of Los Angeles in 1973 to form Loyola Marymount University); now closed
  - Marymount College, the former name of Marymount University in Arlington, Virginia
  - Lynn University, Boca Raton, Florida; formerly Marymount College
  - Marymount College (Kansas), Salina, Kansas; now closed
- Marymount Academy (Sudbury), Ontario, Canada; formerly Marymount College

== See also ==
- Marymount (disambiguation)
