= Laurie Lambrecht =

American artist (born 1955)

Laurie Lambrecht (born 1955) is an American artist working primarily in photography and fiber. Beyond her own work, she is known for her photographs of Roy Lichtenstein, for whom she was an assistant in the early 1990s.

== Career ==
Lambrecht received her undergraduate degree from Marymount College in Tarrytown, New York. She completed her graduate degree at the Visual Studies Workshop in Rochester, New York.

In the early 1990s, Lambrecht was an administrative assistant to Roy Lichtenstein. In 2011, the photographs she took of him and his process was published in the monograph Roy Lichtenstein in His Studio by Monacelli Press.

Lambrecht's works are in the collections of the National Gallery of Art (Washington, D.C.), Parrish Art Museum (Southampton, NY), Portland Art Museum (Portland, OR), among others. She has had solo exhibitions across the US and abroad.

== Work ==
In 2011, Lambrecht showed a selection of photographs from her time as studio assistant to pop artist Roy Lichtenstein at the Drawing Room gallery in East Hampton. The exhibition, Laurie Lambrecht: In Roy Lichtenstein’s Studio, 1990-1992, showed 16 images, at least three of which had never been on public view before.

In 2018, Lambrecht had a solo exhibition titled Jungle Road at Blue Sky in Portland, Oregon.

In 2019, Lambrecht displayed her work in a group exhibition at the Southampton Arts Center, Takeover! Artists in Residence. That same year she was an artist in residence at The Watermill Center in Water Mill, New York alongside sculptor Toni Ross.

In 2022, Lambrecht exhibited a collection of tapestries at the Drawing Room gallery in East Hampton in a show titled Weaving the Unraveled. These works employed photography, embroidery, and weaving into a series of works that alluded to famous paintings.

In 2023, Lambrecht showed embroidered photographs on linen alongside photographs by Wendi Schneider at the Etherton Gallery in Tucson, Arizona in an exhibition titled Reverence: Laurie Lambrecht and Wendi Schneider. That same year she participated in an exhibition titled This Earth following a residency at the Montello Residency in Montello, Nevada.
