= Seafield Convent Grammar School =

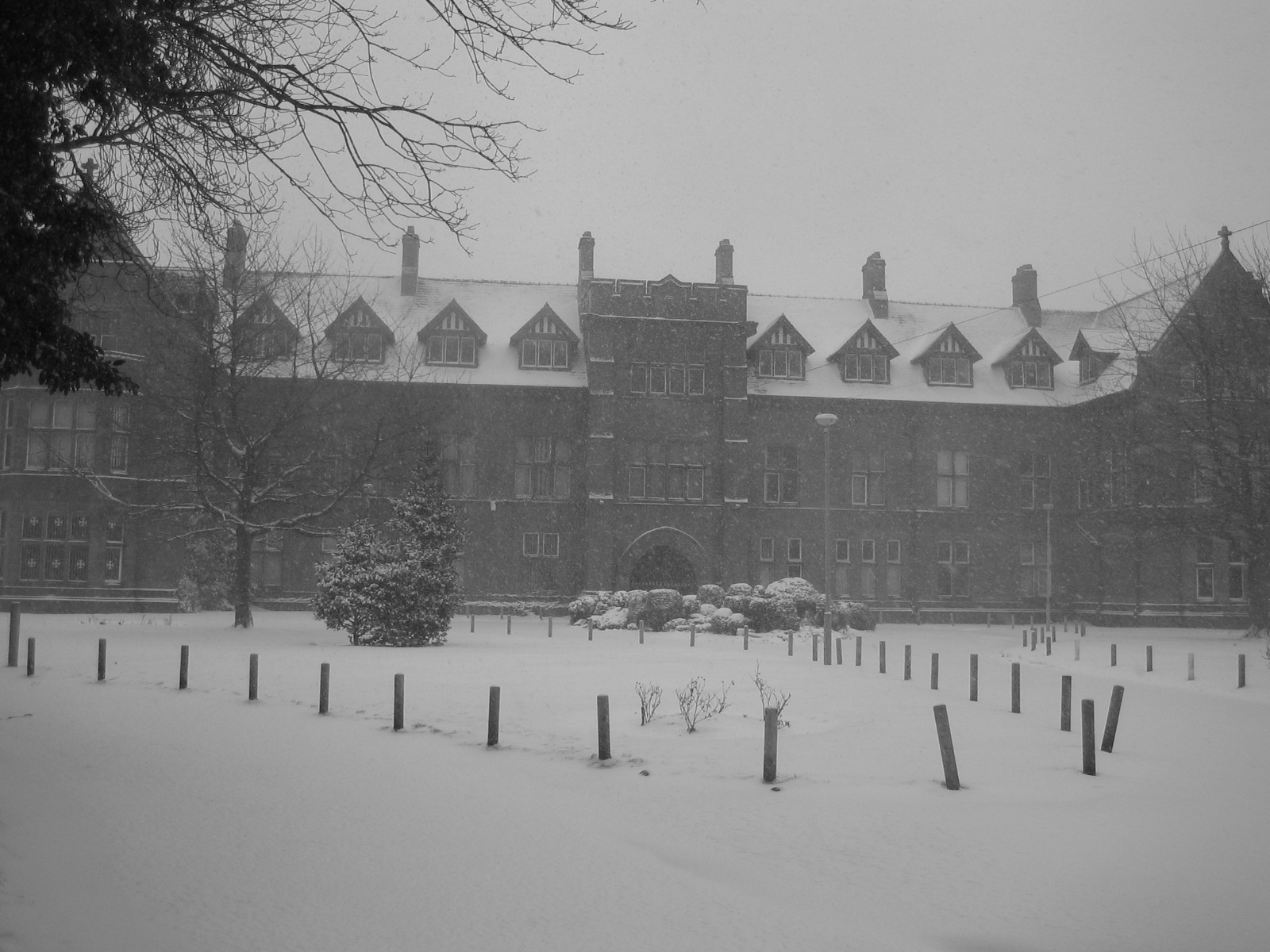

Location
- Seafield Convent Grammar School; Liverpool Road; Crosby; Liverpool; L23; United Kingdom
- Coordinates: 53°29′24″N 3°01′26″W

Information
- Type: Direct Grant Grammar School
- Patron saint: Sacred Heart of Mary
- Established: 1872
- Closed: 1976 (merged into Sacred Heart Catholic College)
- Principal: Mother Superior (various)
- Campus type: Suburban
- Affiliation: Roman Catholic
- Alumni: Cherie Blair

The Seafield Convent of the Sacred Heart of Mary (1908–1977) was founded as a fee-paying Roman Catholic convent school for girls run by the Religious of the Sacred Heart of Mary in 1872 Crosby, England. The school soon moved to Seafield House in Seaforth, which gave it the name by which it is best known.

The school moved to Liverpool Road, Crosby in 1905. It merged with St Bede's Secondary Modern in 1977 to form Sacred Heart Catholic College.

== Revolutionary origins ==
Seafield Convent's history began in France in 1789. The French Revolution of that year, whilst having immense repercussions for all classes and institutions, brought about a massive shift of power from the Roman Catholic Church to the state, and sent shockwaves around Europe. The newly formed French National Assembly began imposing its will over the church with the abolition of the church's right to collect tithes (4 August 1789). However the ferocity of the legislation was to increase rapidly when the Assembly discovered that the French government was virtually bankrupt. To no small extent, the Assembly addressed the financial crisis by having the nation take over the property of the church (while taking on the church's expenses), through the law of 2 December 1789. The Catholic Church had been the largest single landowner in the country, controlling between 10 and 15% of the land in France and the forced re-possession was seen to be a wise decision, enabling the government to introduce a new paper currency, assignats, backed by the confiscated church lands. Further legislation on 13 February 1790 abolished religious vows. The consequent closing of monasteries and convents left some 2,500 monks and 30,000 nuns adrift.

The Law of the Civil Constitution of the Clergy, passed on 12 July 1790 subordinated the Roman Catholic Church in France to the French government. Under the Law all remaining clergy were classed as "state employees" and were obliged to take an oath of loyalty to the constitution. The result was a great divide between church and state. Out of 134 bishops only four accepted the Civil Constitution; two out of every three priests also rejected it.

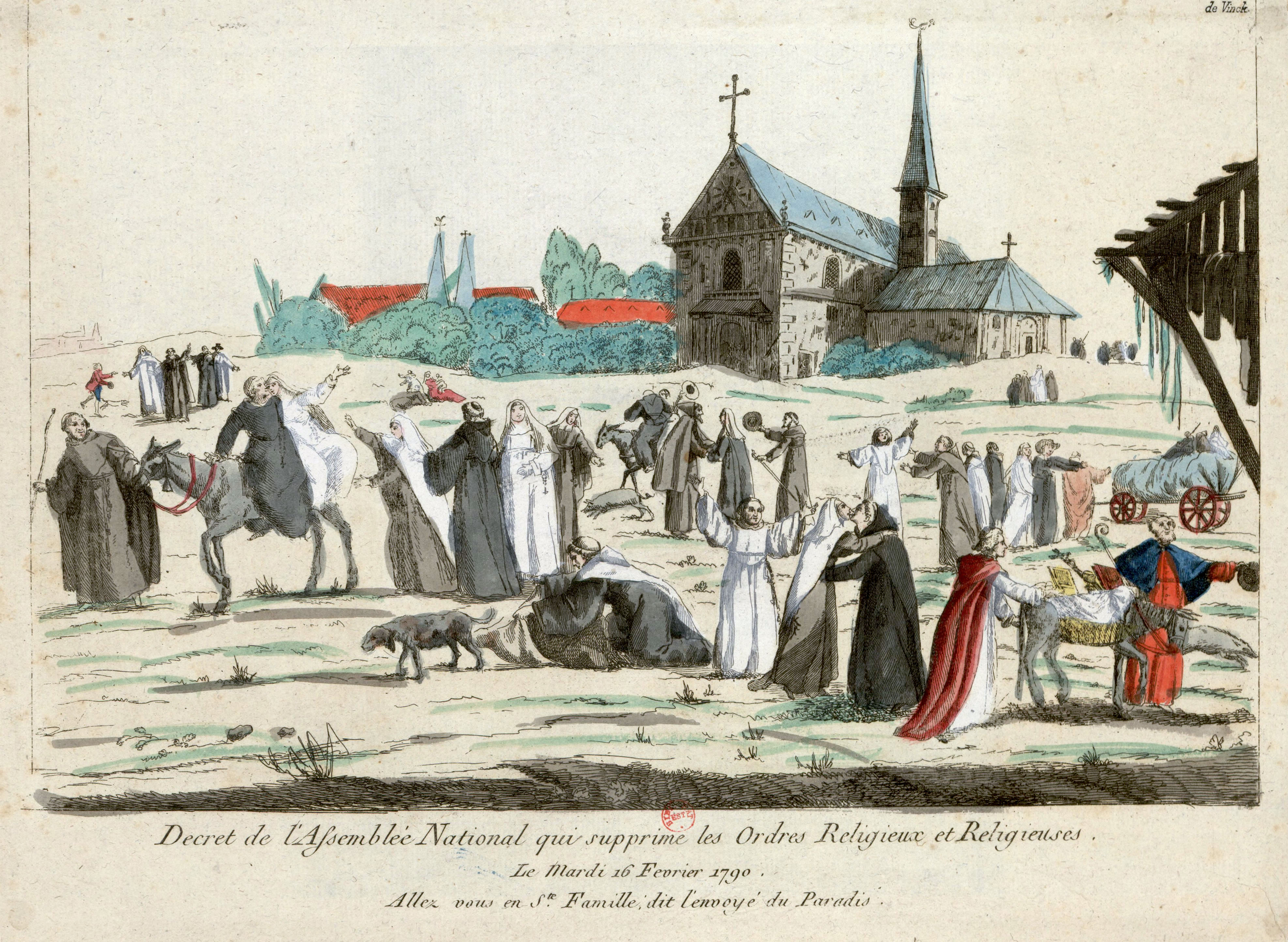
In this caricature, after the decree of 16 February 1790, monks and nuns enjoy their new freedom.

In response to this legislation, the Archbishop of Aix and the Bishop of Clermont led a walkout of clergy from the National Constituent Assembly. The Pope never accepted the new arrangement, and it led to a schism between those clergy who swore the required oath and accepted the new arrangement ("jurors" or "constitutional clergy") and the "non-jurors" or "refractory priests" who refused to do so. In 1799 the new Consulate of France, appointed Napoleon I First Consul. In his new position Napoleon quickly realized that the revolution was threatened if he could not win favour with the majority of the peasants and stabilize France. It was obvious that Catholicism was still the most widespread religion in France, and that he could secure a strong base of support by pacifying the continuing religious strife in western France. Napoleon thus agreed a Concordant with Pope Pius VII in 1801. Unusually the Vatican was forced into accepting terms more favorable to Napoleon. The terms of the Concordant were that:

“The Catholic Religion is to be freely practiced in France. Church property is not to be returned to the Church, however the state will pay the salaries of the Clergy. Bishops are to be appointed by the First Consul but the Pope will retain control over their investiture. The Parish clergy are to take an oath of loyalty to the French state.”

The relaxation of the harsh Civil Constitution lead to the reopening of many churches and the vendetta against religion eased. The Parish Church of St. Aphrodise in Béziers was "redeemed" and the Abbé Martin – formerly a non-juror priest of revolutionary times took control of the parish. The very first child baptized in the church was one Jean Gailhac – the future founder of the Religious of the Sacred Heart of Mary. As the first baptized child of the re-opened parish, Abbé Martin followed the progress of the young Gailhac intently, and later encouraged and gave his guidance and help in nurturing the young boy's desire to become a priest. Gailhac entered the seminary at Montpellier in 1821, aged 19. It was here that he met his great friend and fellow student, Eugéne Cure, who, together with his wife Appollonie, later became Gailhac's spiritual and financial support in all his charitable projects.

Five years later, on 23 September 1826, Gailhac was ordained a priest for the Diocese of Montpellier by Bishop Nicolas Fournier. His dedication and hard work was rewarded with appointment to the seminary's faculty. On 12 September 1828, however, at his own request he was appointed as the chaplain of the Civil and Military Hospital in Béziers – one of the lowest paid jobs in the diocese at the time. It was here that Gailhac's work brought him into contact with the nursing Religious Sisters serving there. The Sisters belonged to various Orders and this led to clashes in duty between their own Order and Gailhac's own charity projects. He eventually felt the need to create an institute to further his charity projects, and his increasing desire to focus upon education, given the terrible of education in the nation following the political and social upheavals of the era.

The Cross worn by the Religious Sisters of the Sacred Heart of Mary. The words on the cross, Ut Vitam Habeant mean: "That They might have Life (John 10:10)

So it was that on 24 February 1849 that Gailhac and Appollonie Cure (now a widow) together with five other women: Eulalie Vidal, Rosalie Gibbal, Rose Jeantet, Cécile Cambon and Marie Roques, founded the Institute of the Religious of the Sacred Heart of Mary. Gailhac acted as their spiritual director and Master of novices for these women. The group began their work in the Good Shepherd Refuge for Women and in a local orphanage. Appollonie Cure, now Mother Saint Jean, was named the Superior General of the new community. In the following year the rule of life of the Religious of the Sacred Heart of Mary, the "RSHM Constitution", was approved on a diocesan level, and on the canonical level in 1880. The Constitution – the mission of the Religious of the Sacred Heart of Mary, is defined: "to know and love God, to make God known and loved, to proclaim that Jesus Christ has come in order that all may have life".

The Institute grew rapidly and by the time the original group made their first profession (religious) in May 1851 their number had grown to ten. As intended by Gailhac, education formed the focus of their work, and the Institute took on the education of orphans as well as opening their first fee-paying Day school and Boarding School. Over the following years the foundation spread – first to Lisburn near Belfast, second to Porto in Portugal and then to Bootle in Liverpool.

== Presence in England ==
=== Founding ===
Liverpool was never actually a target area for the Institute – it was purely by chance that the Religious of the Sacred Heart of Mary actually formed a base there. Sister St. Thomas Hennessy, who had been instrumental in forming the Institute's base in Ireland was returning there with a sick novice. Unfortunately she was delayed and missed the boat from Liverpool to Belfast. Unable to find alternative passage, she was forced to stay a few days in the city, and fate lead her to meet the Reverend Thomas Kelly, the Parish Priest of St. James' Parish in Bootle. Kelly had for many months been desperately seeking a religious order to cater for the spiritual and educational needs of the children in his parish. After consultation with Gailhac, it was agreed to seek the Bishop of Liverpool's permission for a foundation to be made, which was duly granted. A translation from the French copy of the letter received by the Reverend Mother from Alexander Goss, the second Bishop of Liverpool, is printed below:

Liverpool, December 21st, 1871

Dear Reverend Mother,

I am ordered by his Lordship, the Bishop of Liverpool, to inform you that he gives his approval and sanction to your making a foundation in his diocese in order that you may take care of the classes for the poor children of Bootle, that you may start a fee-paying day-school and boarding school in the Parish of St. James Bootle as was stated in your letter of 20th September last.

I am always your devoted servant in J.C.

(Signed) John Augustine Fisher

Vicar General

The institute founded its Liverpool base in Sea View Road, Bootle on 21 June 1872. Madame Eugéne, Gailhac's own niece, became the Mother Superior of the small community of eight Sisters. The foundation was a victim of its own success and soon found that it could no longer adequately provide for the increasing number of boarders. A search began for a more suitable property, and this was when the Sisters discovered Seafield house in Seaforth, and the name which would remain with them for the next 93 years.

=== Seaforth ===
Seafield House in Seaforth was the home of James Fernie, a wealthy businessman who had made his fortune in shipping. He had helped form the International Marine Hydro Company, and with the money from this venture, planned to extend his house and property to create a first class hotel for transatlantic voyagers. The house was opened to great applause by the Earl of Lathom on 25 September 1882. An article in the Daily Express on 14 September 1882 described the new hotel:

"The house with the conservatories, winter gardens and recreation grounds, covers an area of 10 acres (40,000 m^{2}) which has been carefully laid out in the most approved style, the hotel – an imposing structure with its three coronial towers, contains about 250 bedrooms all substantially, and many very elegantly, furnished, while the baths and all other conveniences are as near perfection as possible. It is said that there are 365 windows, one for each day of the year".

Unfortunately the hotel had been opened during a decline in the number of transatlantic passengers and so suffered from poor business. The house became known as its originator's folly – "Fernie’s Folly" in this instance. The decline in Atlantic trade and shipping is marked by the fact that the Sisters purchased the property in 1884 – just two years after its triumphant opening.

The Garden fete souvenir Booklet of 1958 celebrating the School's Golden Jubilee

=== Crosby ===
There was little chance of the school outgrowing the new property or seeking more modern facilities and so it was expected that Seafield would remain the institute's home in Liverpool for good. However the Mersey Docks and Harbour Board (now Company under Peel Holdings) wished to purchase the property envisaging the need to enlarge the docks in the future. The offer, the value of which is still not entirely known, was to construct a purpose-built convent of fully modern facilities and design somewhere close to Bootle. Despite rapidly expanding towns and great urbanization there were many areas, often close to the heart of local towns that were proposed, including a spacious plot off Moor Lane. The suggestion to build the new convent on land where Marldon Avenue now stands was quickly dropped on advice of one solicitor to the Sisters, who pointed out the "problems" which could occur in building a girls school opposite Merchant Taylor's Boys School. For reasons unknown the Moor Lane site was brushed aside in favour of the Liverpool Road site, now called "New Hey".

Construction of the building in Crosby began in 1905, with the school starting to give classes even before the work was completed in 1908.

=== Later fate of Seafield House ===
After the Order vacated Seafield House completely in 1908 it remained empty until 1912 when the Lancashire Asylum Board, under the West Derby Union leased it. Early on the morning of 22 September 1913 a great fire (not the first at the property) destroyed two storeys of the house, resulting in the re-construction of the North Wing. No one was charged in connection with the fire, although action by the suffragette movement was suspected. From this time onwards Seafield House catered for mentally deficient children, its coastal location believed to be of help to its patients.

With the arrival of war in 1939 the house was turned over to treating casualties of the Battle of the Atlantic. The many rooms and facilities suited it to this need, and it remained a hospital until 1947. The house then remained empty until 1950 when the government used it to house offices.

The school was attended by many notable pupils. Cherie Blair CBE QC, a British barrister and wife to former prime minister Tony Blair, attended the school from 1966 until 1972.

The building was demolished on 5 February 1970, having served many varied uses. One eyewitness who was connected to the school in Crosby on seeing the demolition remarked "Though I was never in the building, I felt as if someone I had known was receiving that battering".

== Headmistresses of Seafield Convent ==
- Madame Eugène 1872-????
- Miss Winifred Muriel Cooper 1911–17
- Madame M. Anthony 1917–28
- Madame St. Edward 1928–59
- Sister Françoise 1959–70
- Sister Scholastica 1970–75, originally Moyra Murphy, who taught drawing; left ca. 1932 to become a nun
- Sister Bernadine 1975-77
