= Merrymount =

Merrymount or Merry Mount may refer to:

- Merrymount Colony, a former British colony located in what is now Quincy, Massachusetts
- Merrymount (Quincy, Massachusetts), a neighborhood in Quincy, site of the colony
- Merry Mount (opera), an opera loosely based on story of the colony

== See also ==
- Mariemont (disambiguation)
- Mary Mount (disambiguation)
- Marymount (disambiguation)
