= Marymount International School, Paris =

Marymount International School Paris

Location
- 72, boulevard de la Saussaye; Neuilly-sur-Seine, 92200; France; 48°53′32.5″N 2°16′10.2″E

Information
- Type: Private Co-educational Day school International School
- Religious affiliations: Roman Catholic (Religious of the Sacred Heart of Mary)
- Established: 1923; 103 years ago
- Head of School: Sarah Thomas
- Principal: Eoghan Beardmore
- Grades: Pre-kindergarten–8
- Campus type: Suburban
- Accreditation: MSA, CIS
- Website: www.marymount.fr

Marymount International School Paris in Neuilly-sur-Seine, France is an international school in the Paris metropolitan area and is part of the Religious of the Sacred Heart of Mary network of Marymount schools.

The history of Marymount Paris can be traced back to 1846 when Father Jean Gailhac founded an order of Sisters in Béziers in the south of France. The objective, considered a progressive idea at that time, was the education of young women. Schools eventually opened in Portugal, England, Ireland and the United States.

When Marymount College was opened in Tarrytown, New York in 1908, the founder's new vision was to educate from an international perspective. Study abroad centers were then established in London, Paris and Rome. Marymount Paris opened on September 30, 1923 in town of Neuilly-sur-Seine, just outside Paris.

Today, Marymount International School Paris provides an international curriculum, in English and French, to students aged 2 to 14 years old, organized into the following grade levels:

- Early Years (2 – 6 years old)
  - Early Learners 1
  - Early Learners 2
  - Early Learners 3
  - Kindergarten
- Elementary School (6 – 11 years old)
  - Grade 1
  - Grade 2
  - Grade 3
  - Grade 4
  - Grade 5
- Middle School (11 – 14 years old)
  - Grade 6
  - Grade 7
  - Grade 8

In Fall of 2027, Marymount International School Paris will open a Grade 9.

== Notable alumni ==
Famous alumni include Chicago Bulls player Joakim Noah and Anna-Catherine Hartley (also known as Uffie), singer on the French label Ed Banger Records and James Thiérrée (actor, performer, artist and grandson of Charlie Chaplin).
