= Mount Eva =

Mountain in Alaska, U.S.

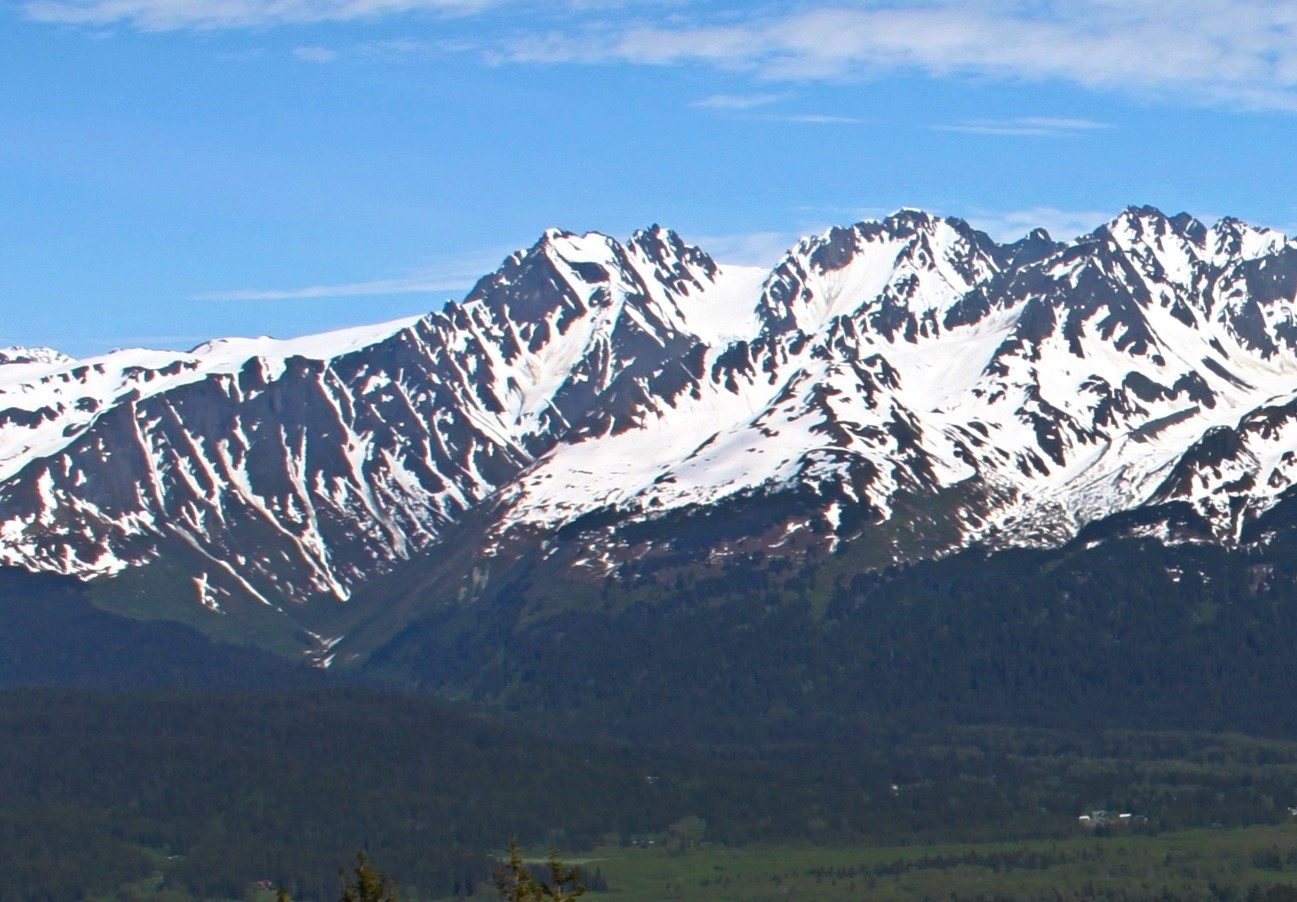
- Southwest aspect, centered

Highest point
- Elevation: 5,019 ft (1,530 m)
- Prominence: 525 ft (160 m)
- Isolation: 1.95 mi (3.14 km)
- Coordinates: 60°10′01″N 149°16′06″W

Geography
- Location within Alaska
- Interactive map of Mount Eva
- Country: United States
- State: Alaska
- Borough: Kenai Peninsula
- Protected area: Chugach National Forest
- Parent range: Kenai Mountains
- Topo map: USGS Seward A-7

Mount Eva is a 5,019-foot-elevation (1,530-meter) mountain summit in Alaska, United States.

== Description ==
Mount Eva is located seven miles (11 km) northeast of Seward in the Kenai Mountains, on land managed by Chugach National Forest. Precipitation runoff and glacial meltwater from the mountain drains to Resurrection Bay five miles (8.0 km) to the southwest. Although modest in elevation, topographic relief is significant as the summit rises 4,500 feet (1,371 m) above Salmon Creek in 2.25 miles (3.62 km). The mountain's toponym was officially adopted December 13, 2001, by the United States Board on Geographic Names. The mountain is named for Eva Lowell (1884–1951), whose family were early settlers of Seward. Eva was the daughter of Mary Lowell (Mount Mary) and sister to Alice (Mount Alice).

== Climate ==
Based on the Köppen climate classification, Mount Eva is located in a tundra climate zone with long, cold, snowy winters, and mild summers. Weather systems coming off the Gulf of Alaska are forced upwards by the Kenai Mountains (orographic lift), causing heavy precipitation in the form of rainfall and snowfall. Winter temperatures can drop below 0 °F with wind chill factors below −10 °F. This climate supports the Bear Lake Glacier on the north and east flanks of the peak as well as a smaller unnamed glacier on the west slope.

== Gallery ==
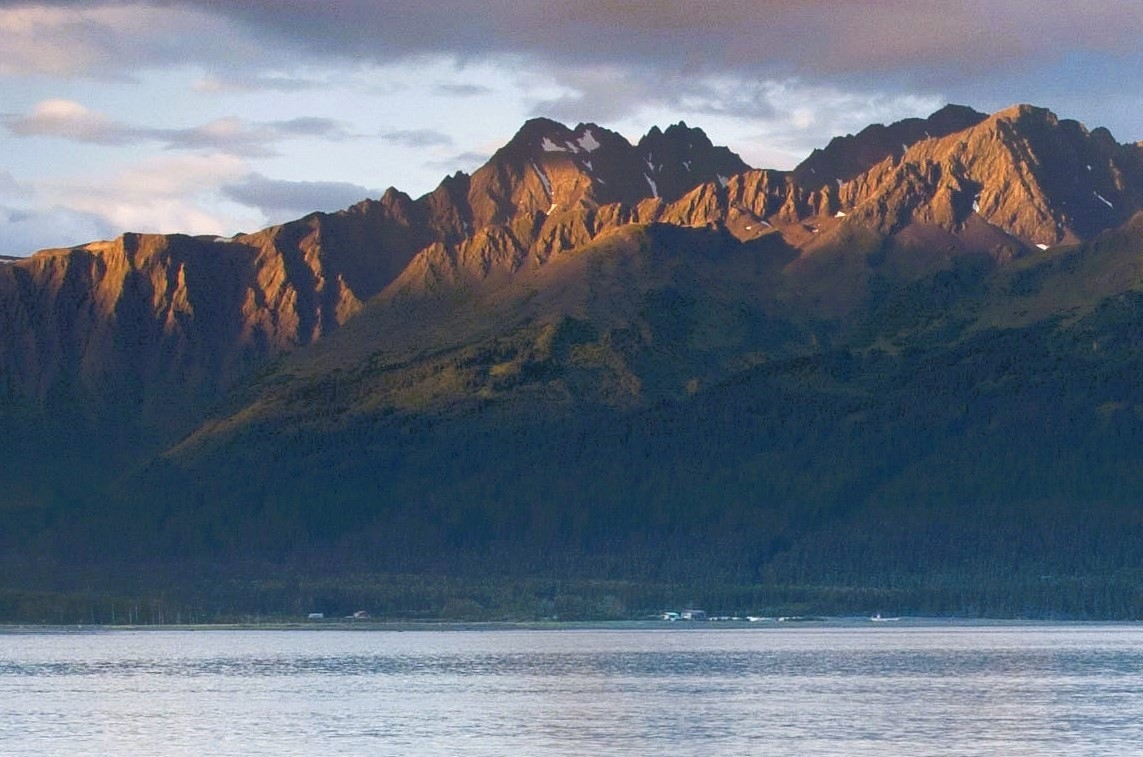
Mount Eva centered

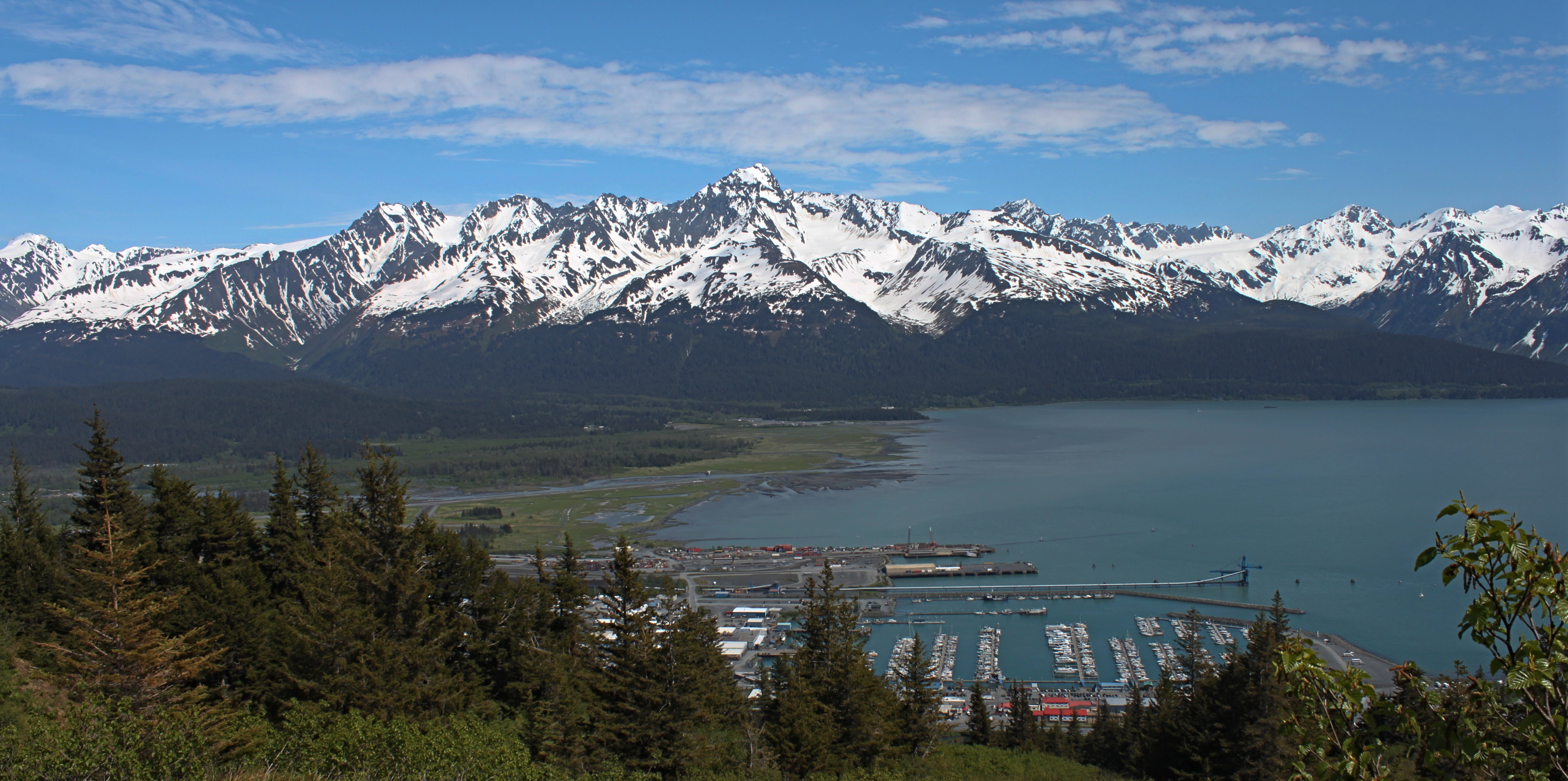
Mount Alice centered with Mount Eva to left.

== See also ==
- List of mountain peaks of Alaska
- Geography of Alaska
