= Mount Alice (Alaska) =

Mountain in Alaska, United States

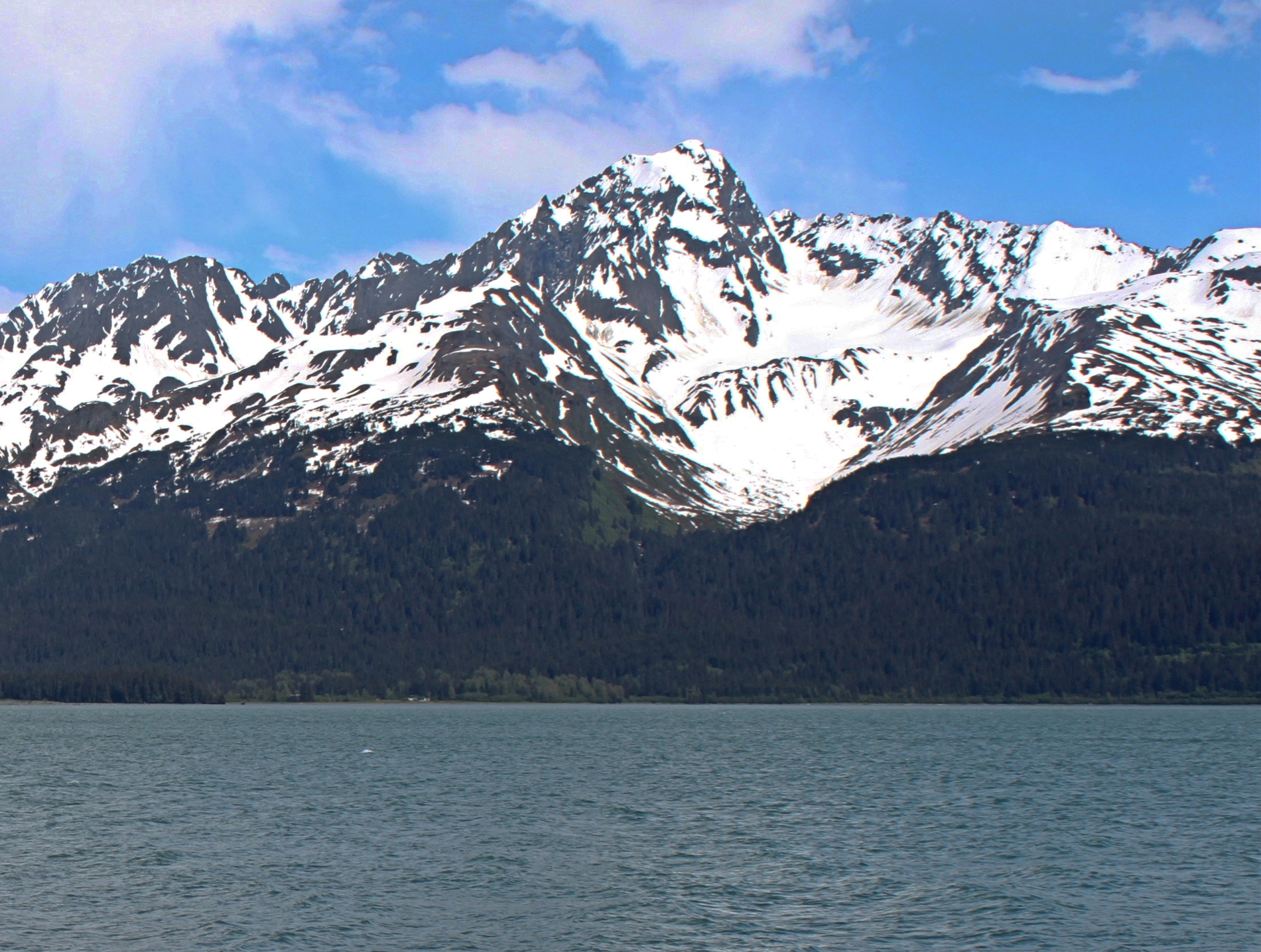
- Mount Alice, southwest aspect

Highest point
- Elevation: 5,318 ft (1,621 m)
- Prominence: 1,247 ft (380 m)
- Isolation: 2.11 mi (3.40 km)
- Coordinates: 60°08′07″N 149°16′40″W

Geography
- Location within Alaska
- Interactive map of Mount Alice
- Country: United States
- State: Alaska
- Borough: Kenai Peninsula
- Protected area: Chugach National Forest
- Parent range: Kenai Mountains
- Topo map: USGS Seward A-7

Climbing
- First ascent: 1963 by V. Hoeman, D. Hilt, and D. Johnston
- Easiest route: Mountaineering, Southwest Face

Mount Alice is a 5,318-foot (1,621 m) mountain summit in the U.S. state of Alaska.

== Description ==
Mount Alice is located 6.2 mi (10 km) northeast of Seward, Alaska, from where it appears as the most prominent peak on the east skyline across Resurrection Bay. It is set in the Kenai Mountains on land managed by Chugach National Forest. Although modest in elevation, topographic relief is significant as the summit rises one vertical mile above the bay and Resurrection River in four miles (6.4 km). The mountain's toponym was officially adopted in 1983 by the United States Board on Geographic Names to honor Alice Lowell Scheffler (1879–1965), the daughter of Franklin G. Lowell, who with his family were the first homesteaders to settle the Seward area in 1883. Alice was the daughter of Mary Lowell (Mount Mary) and sister to Eva (Mount Eva).

== Climbing ==
The first ascent of the peak was made in 1963 by John Vincent Hoeman, David Johnston, and D. Hilt. The standard route is via the southwest face which entails steep snow and traditional class 5.0 rock climbing.

== Climate ==
Based on the Köppen climate classification, Mount Alice is located in a tundra climate zone with long, cold, snowy winters, and mild summers. Weather systems coming off the Gulf of Alaska are forced upwards by the Kenai Mountains (orographic lift), causing heavy precipitation in the form of rainfall and snowfall. Winter temperatures can drop below 0 °F with wind chill factors below −10 °F. This climate supports a spruce and hemlock forest on the lower western slopes, and the massive Godwin Glacier on the eastern side of the mountain. May and June are the best months for climbing in terms of favorable weather.

== Gallery ==
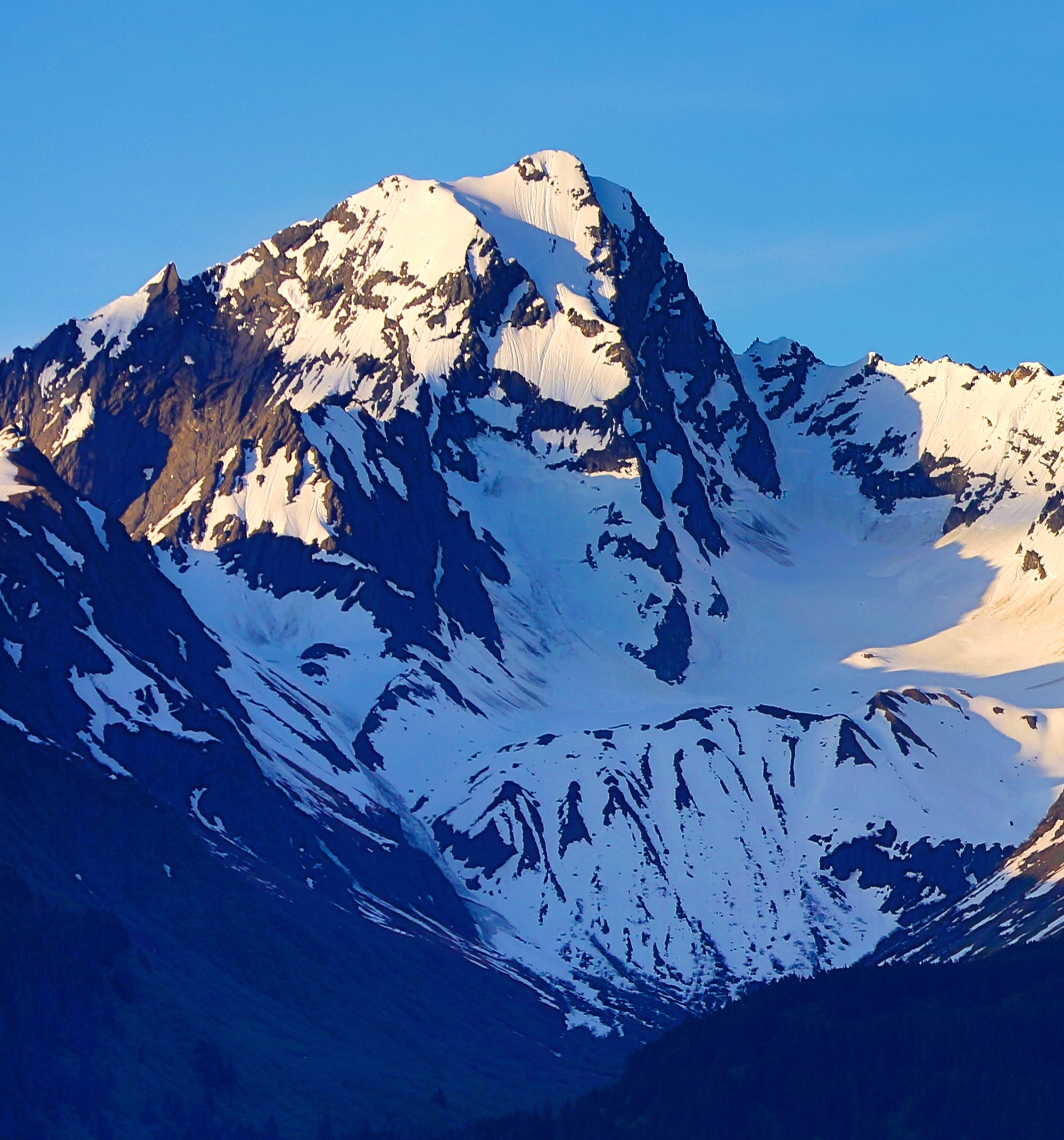
Summit detail

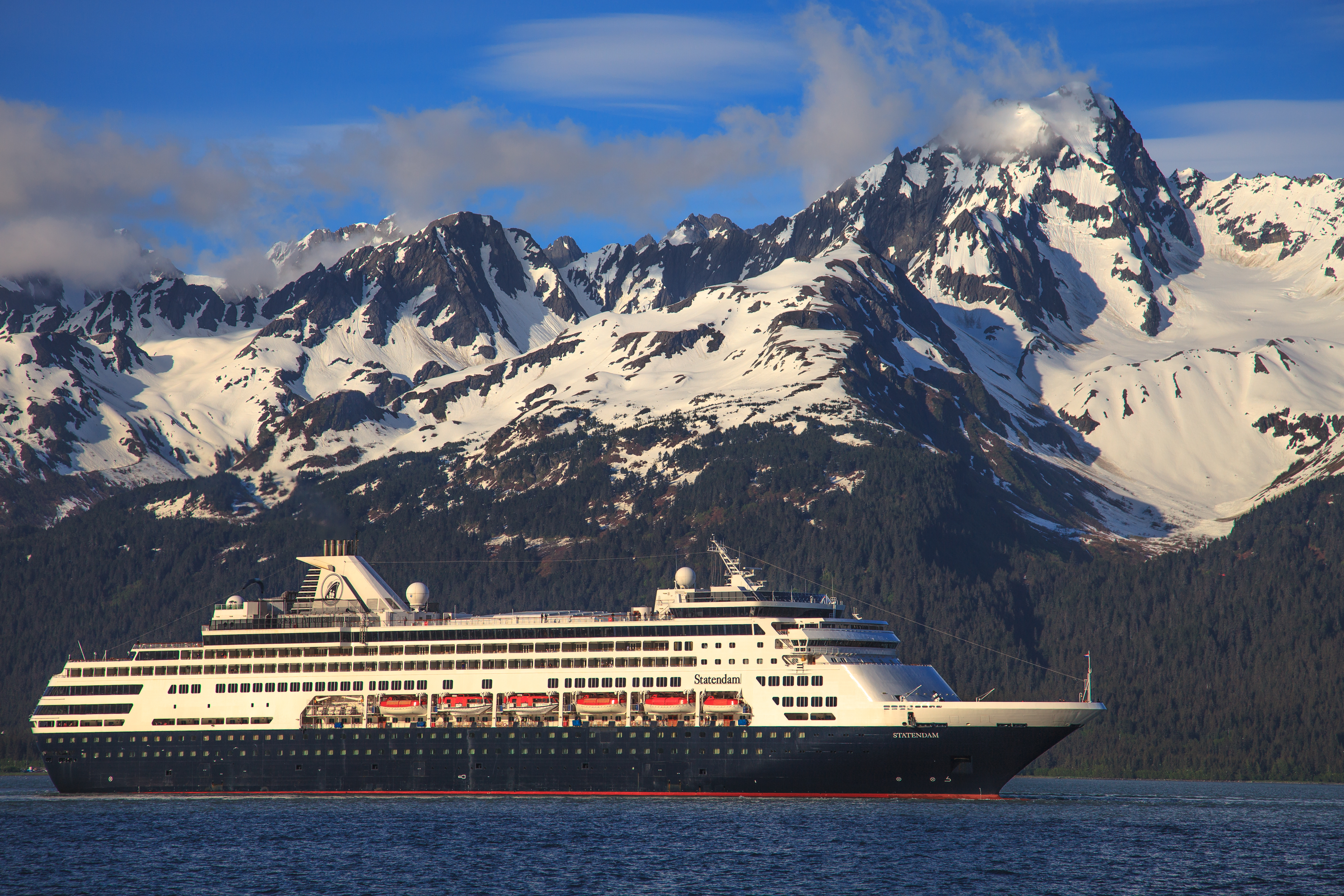
Mt. Alice (right) seen with cruise ship in Resurrection Bay

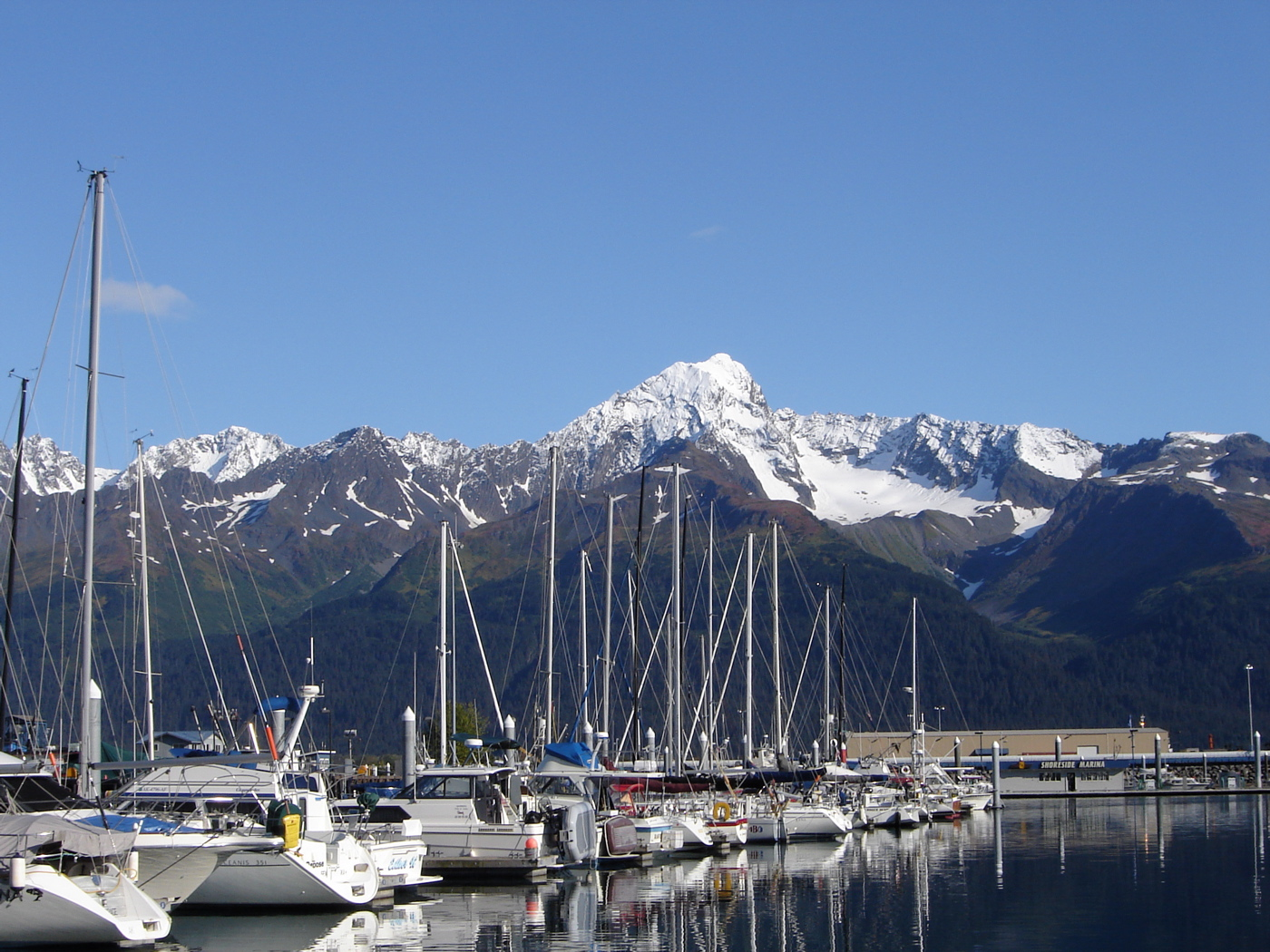
Mt. Alice seen from Seward marina

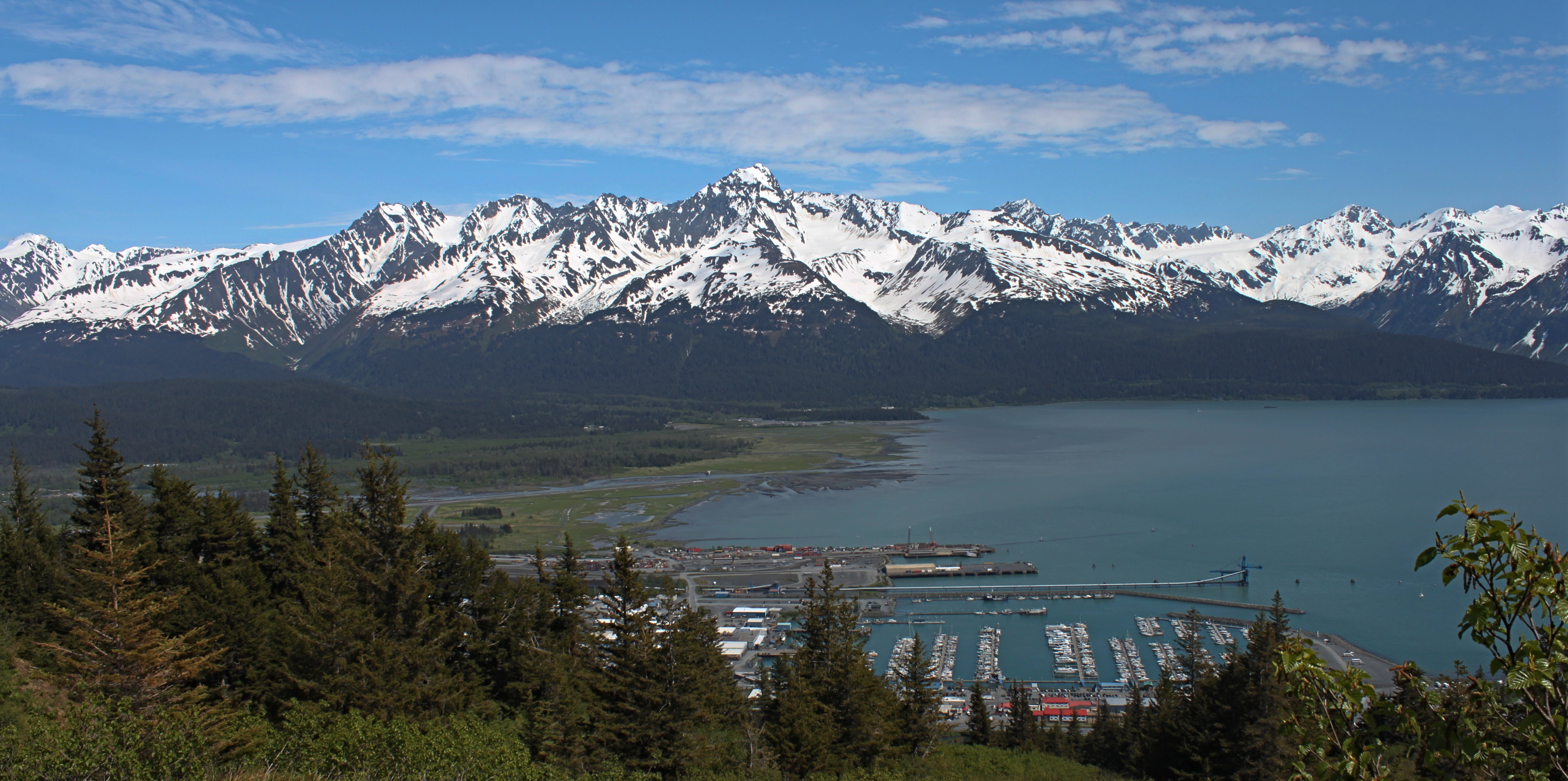
Mount Alice (centered) seen from Mount Marathon

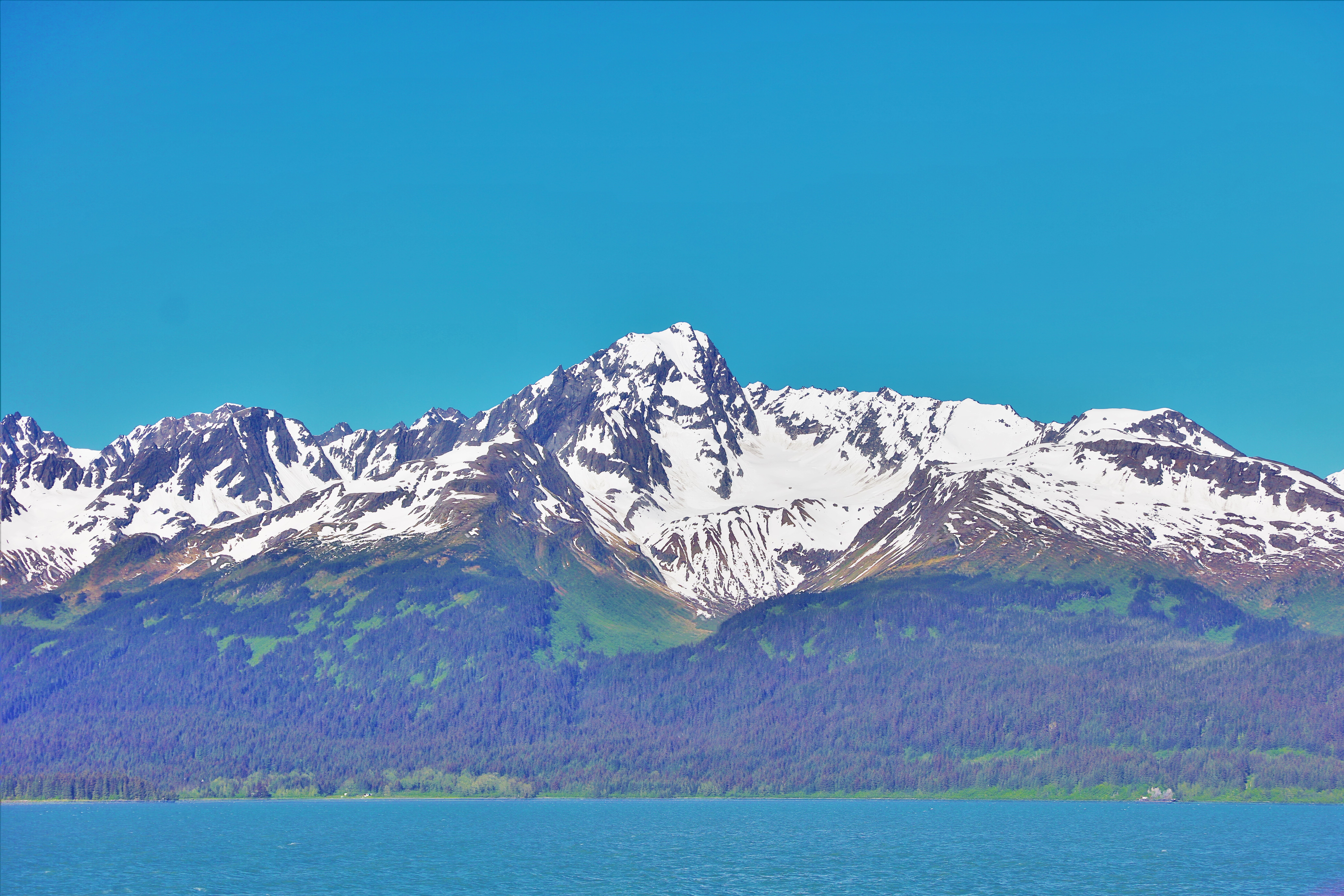

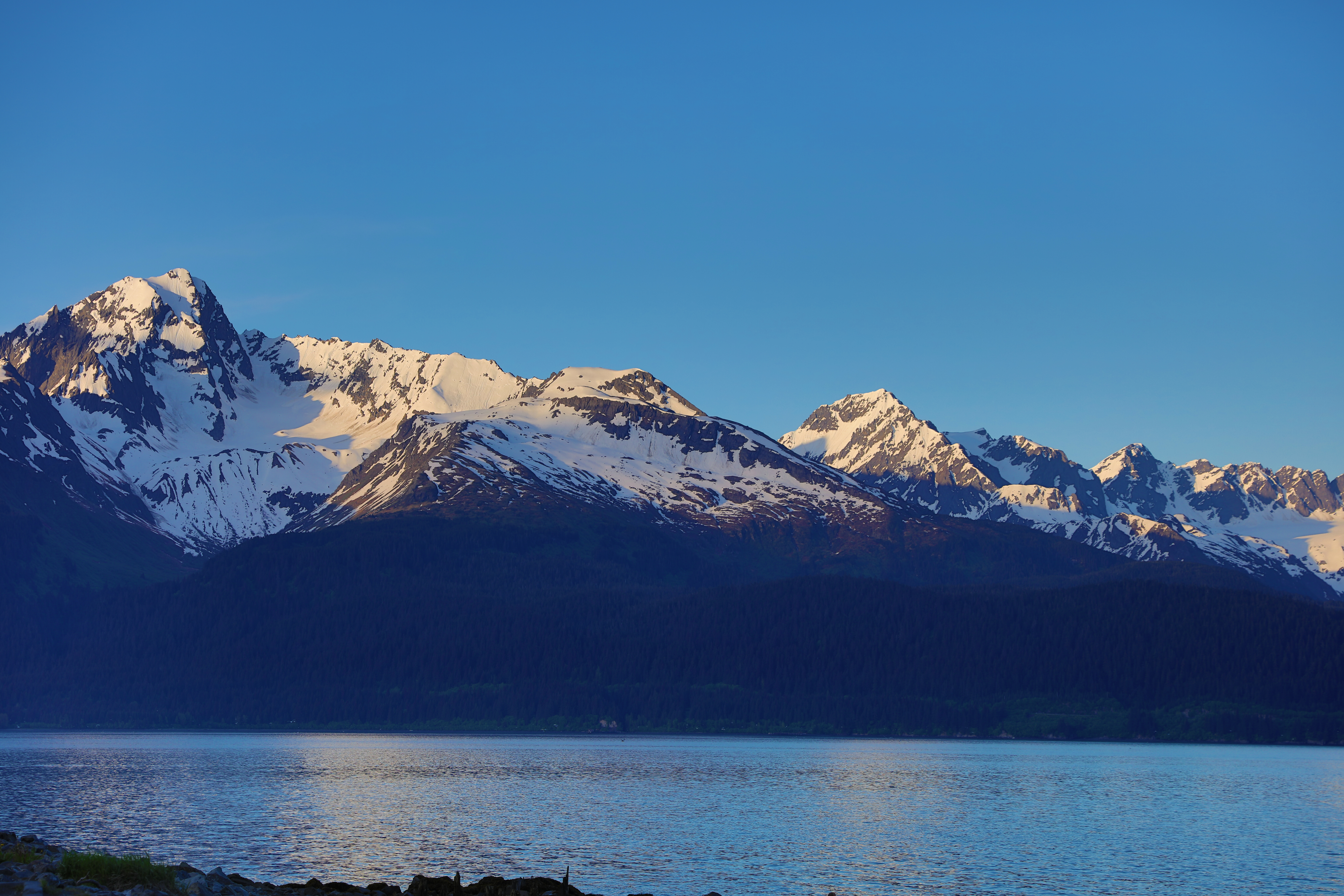
Mt. Alice (left) and Mt. Mary (right)

== See also ==
- List of mountain peaks of Alaska
- Geology of Alaska
