= Mount Mercy =

Mount Mercy may refer to:

- Mount Arafat, a hill in Hejaz, Saudi Arabia (also known as "Mount of Mercy")
- Mount Mercy University, Cedar Rapids, Iowa, U.S.
- Mount Mercy College, Cork, Ireland
- Mount Mercy Academy (Buffalo, New York), U.S.

== See also ==
- Mount Marcy (disambiguation)
- Mount Mary (disambiguation)
- Mount Mercer, Victoria, Australia
- Mount Mercer (Antarctica)
