= Sacred Heart of Mary Girls' School =

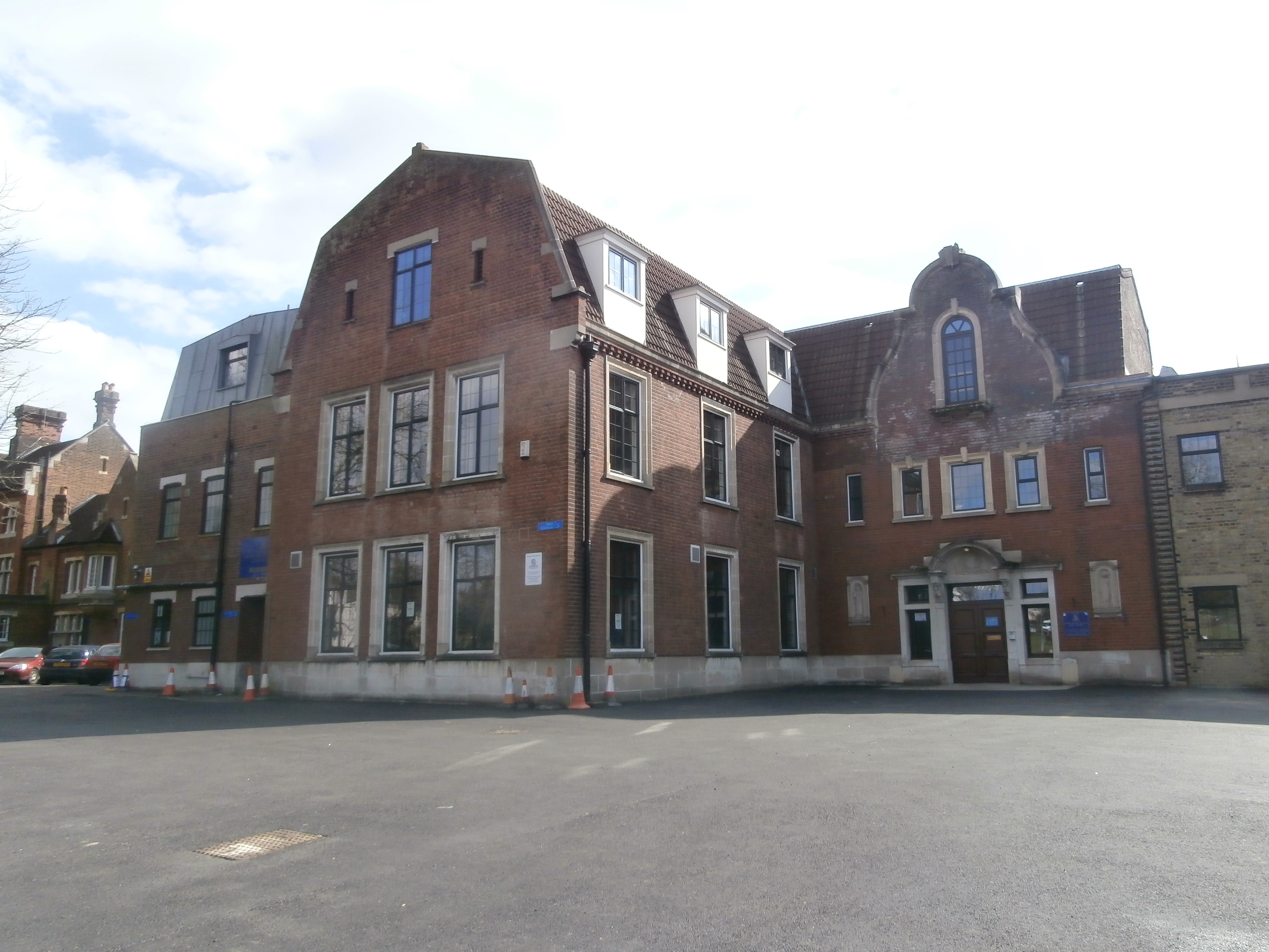
- Front elevation

Location
- St Mary's Lane; Upminster, RM14 2QR; England; 51.55602°N 0.243435°E

Information
- Type: Academy
- Motto: Ut Vitam Habeant (Life to the Full)
- Religious affiliation: Roman Catholic
- Established: 1927; 99 years ago
- Founder: Sisters of the Sacred Heart of Mary
- Department for Education URN: 137233 Tables
- Ofsted: Reports
- Head: Vivienne Qurrey
- Gender: Girls
- Age: 11 to 18
- Enrolment: 800~
- Colour: Blue
- Website: www.sacredheartofmary.net

Sacred Heart of Mary Girls' School is a Catholic girls' secondary school with academy status located in Upminster, an area in London Borough of Havering, England.

== Admissions ==
It serves the deanery of Havering and girls from practising Catholic families. DEAD REF

== History ==
=== School ===
In 1927 nuns from the Religious of the Sacred Heart of Mary bought Hill Place for use as a convent, naming it the Convent of the Sacred Heart of Mary. Hence the school has been colloquially known as "Upminster Convent School". It was established as a small independent fee-paying day and boarding school called "Convent Collegiate School" catering for girls of all ages and boys up to the age of eight.

At the outbreak of World War II the school was evacuated to Chilton House in Buckinghamshire. The school premises suffered no damage during the Blitz despite its proximity to RAF Hornchurch. In 1946 after the war ended, teachers and pupils returned to London and classes resumed. With the advent of the tripartite system, Convent Collegiate became a voluntary aided secondary modern. It turned comprehensive in 1978 when the system was abolished. By then Sisters on staff included Sisters from other orders and the teachers were predominantly lay staff. The first lay headteacher was appointed in 1983.

=== Hill Place ===
Central to the property is a large Gothic house designed by architect W.G. Barlett, who had also remodelled St Laurence's Church nearby, during the 1870s. The house was Grade II listed. The house had an impressive entrance hall, with marble flooring, oak panelling and above the main staircaseuse a stained glass window designed by Edward Burne-Jones and made by William Morris.

The original Hill Place was built in 1790 and was part of James Esdaile's estate. In 1827 it was owned by Wasey Sterry and after his death a number of tenants before being bought by Temple Soanes in 1867. Soanes commissioned William Gibbs Bartlett to reconstruct the house, between 1871 and 1873, in the gothic style. In 1895 E.S. Woodiwiss bought the house and kept a private Zoo in the grounds. Following other owners the house was bought by the Religious of the Sacred Heart of Mary as a convent and Catholic girls school. A Georgian style chapel in red brick was built against the east end of Hill Place in 1935 and was demolished in the 1960s due to structural problems following subsidence.

In July 2013 the property was put up for sale by the Trustee.

=== The Old Chapel ===
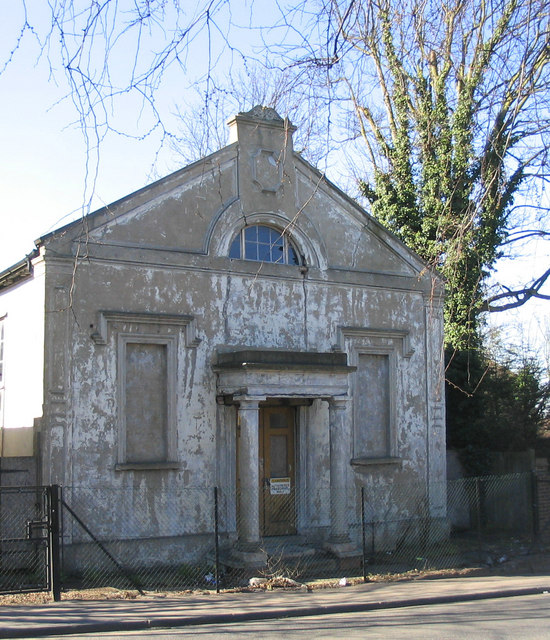
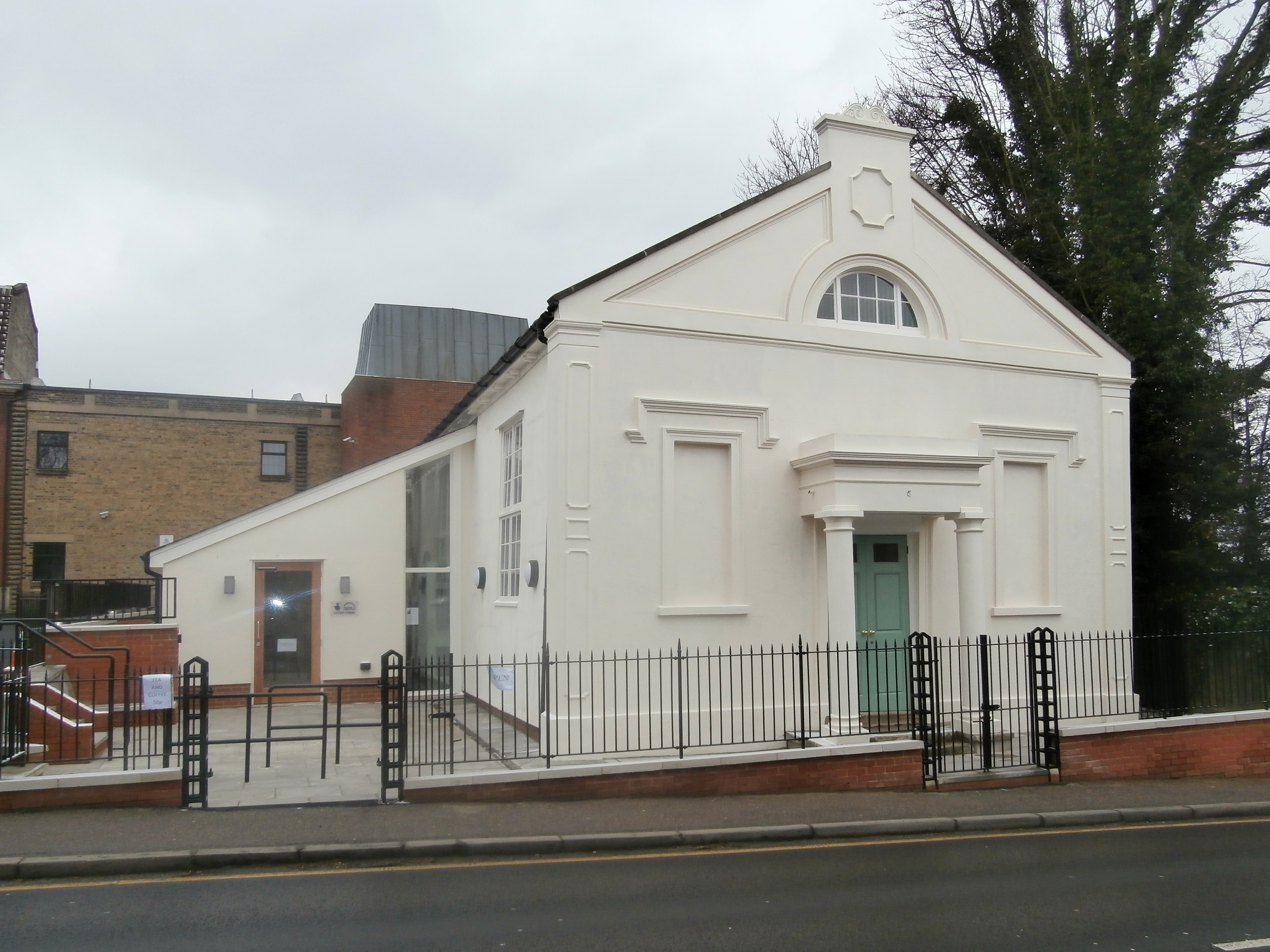
The chapel before (top) and after (bottom) refurbishment

The Old Chapel was designed and built by Samuel Hammond and opened in June 1800 as an alternative place of worship for Protestant Dissenters. This group were known as ‘Dissenters’ because they moved away from the established church. partly due to a dispute over tithe payments to the parish church, St Laurence, to fund its upkeep. The gallery was enlarged in 1803 to contain more seating. In 1827 the building was extended and a vestry added. In 1873 the building was extensively refurbished which included heating, gas lighting and a new pulpit. The congregation of the Old Chapel grew steadily throughout the Victorian era and in 1911 as Upminster grew as a garden suburb led the increasing number of worshippers move to new premises; Trinity Church on Station Road.

Another Christian group, the Plymouth Brethren, bought the Chapel for £400 and worshipped from there from 1911 to 1988. The building was listed Grade II in 1979.

The trusteeship of the Chapel passed to the Havering Christian Fellowship in 1992.

The Parent Teacher and Friends Association of the school purchased the Chapel in 2005 and with a grant in 2007 of £670,800 from the Heritage Lottery Fund and over £390,000 from others the building which had been on English Heritage's "At Risk" Register since 1991 was restored to include toilets, a kitchen and meeting spaces and the chapel will be put to use as a heritage centre to showcase the chapel's history and its place in the history of Upminster.

In 2012, construction workers doing restoration works at the Old Chapel dug up 24 unexploded shells and bombs (dubbed by students and staff, "The SHOM Bombs") on the compound in the space of three weeks. Historians later identified them as those from the Blitz of World War II and hypothesised that they had been buried there by the military with intent of disposal.

== Description ==
The school was judged by Ofsted as outstanding when it was a voluntary-aided girls comprehensive school in 2009. It changed its status to an academy in 2011; and was inspected again by Ofsted in 2013. Again it was judged to be outstanding. Ofsted described it then as a smaller-than-average secondary school with an average racial mix. The largest minority ethnic group is Black African heritage. A smaller than average group of students is eligible for the pupil premium; the additional government funding for looked-after children, students known to be eligible for free school meals and children of service families, similarly the number of disabled students, students with special education need statements or entitled to catch-up funding.

== Curriculum ==
Virtually all maintained schools and academies follow the National Curriculum, and are inspected by Ofsted on how well they succeed in delivering a 'broad and balanced curriculum'.

The school operates a three-year, Key Stage 3 where all the core National Curriculum subjects are taught. Year 7 and Year 8 study core subjects: Religious Studies, English, Mathematics, Science. The following foundation subjects are offered: Art, Computing, Technology, Drama, PSHE & Citizenship, Italian, French, Geography and History, Music and PE.

For Key Stage 4, students start their GCSE studies at the beginning of Year 10. They follow a set of core courses: Religious Studies, English Language, English Literature, Mathematics, Science all of which lead to a potential qualification. This core group of subjects is supported by four optional courses. Within the combination of subjects available students will have the chance to study for an English Baccalaureate)(EBACC qualification. Students must also attend PE and PSRE. The principal modern foreign language is Italian.
