= Marymount colleges =

Catholic educational institutions

The Marymount Colleges are a group of colleges founded by the Religious of the Sacred Heart of Mary (RSHM), an institute with French origins which was founded on February 24, 1849.

== Mexico ==
Colégio Marymount, Cuernavaca was founded in 1957. It is one of the biggest schools in the city and has one of the best campuses in the state of Morelos.

== United States ==
=== California ===
In 1923, Marymount School of Los Angeles was founded. In 1933, it opened Marymount Junior College and in 1948 it assumed the name Marymount College of Los Angeles. In 1973, it merged with the Jesuit Loyola University in 1973 and currently exists as Loyola Marymount University.

=== Florida ===
In 1962, Marymount College of Boca Raton was founded. By 1971, the college had entered a transitional period; in 1974, Marymount College of Boca Raton became the College of Boca Raton. The college gained university standing under the name Lynn University in 1991.

=== Virginia ===
In 1950, Marymount College of Virginia was founded in Arlington. The college became co-educational in 1972 and gained its university status in 1986. It currently exists as Marymount University.

== Closed ==
=== California ===
An extension site to Marymount College of Los Angeles was founded at Palos Verdes in 1960, and became known as Marymount California University. It closed in August 2022.

=== New York ===
Of the American colleges founded by RSHM, Marymount College, Tarrytown, was founded first, on December 8, 1907, founded by Johanna Butler. In 2002. it consolidated with Fordham University. In fall 2005, Fordham University announced that it would close the college in June 2007, graduating the last class that year. On March 17, 2008, Fordham announced the sale of the campus for $27 million to EF Education, a chain of private language-instruction schools.

In 1936, an extension of Marymount College, Tarrytown, was formed in Manhattan. It later became the co-educational college formerly known as Marymount Manhattan College, which merged into Northeastern University in 2026.
