= Sacred Heart Catholic College =

Secondary school in Sefton, UK

Coordinates: 53°29′24″N 3°01′26″W

Sacred Heart Catholic Academy
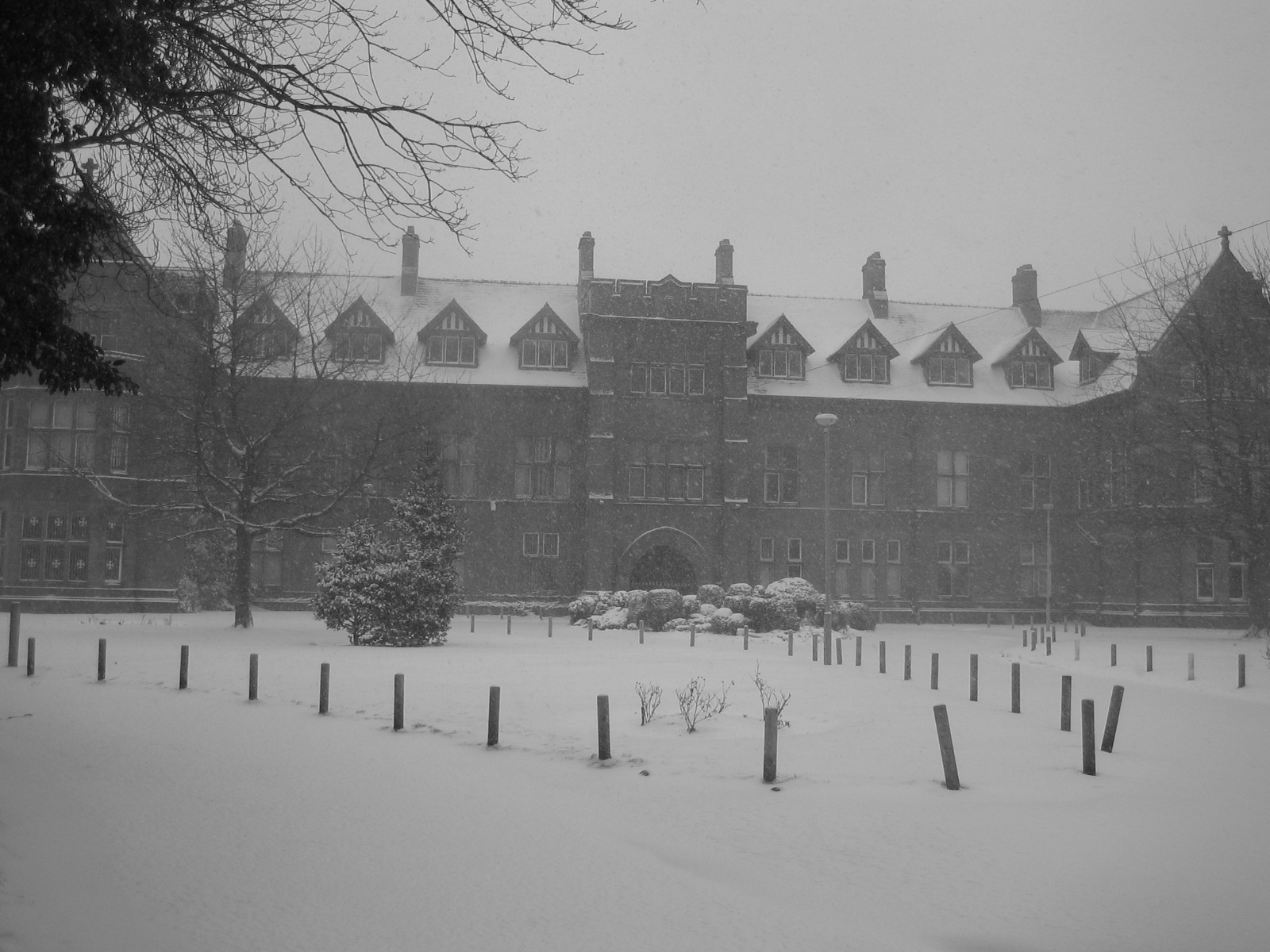

Location
- Liverpool Road; Crosby, Merseyside, L23 5TF; England

Information
- Type: Academy
- Motto: 'Aspire not to have more, but to be more' - St Oscar Romero
- Religious affiliation: Roman Catholic
- Established: 1977 (merger)
- Local authority: Sefton
- Trust: Pope Francis Multi Academy Trust
- Department for Education URN: 149047 Tables
- Ofsted: Reports
- Head Teacher: Mark O'Hagan
- Gender: Coeducational
- Age: 11 to 18
- Colours: Navy Blue, Yellow
- Website: http://www.sacredheart.sefton.sch.uk/

Sacred Heart Catholic Academy is a Roman Catholic secondary school located in Crosby, Merseyside, England. It was created from the amalgamation of Seafield Convent Grammar and St Bede's Secondary Modern in 1977, and was previously known as Sacred Heart Catholic High School and Sacred Heart Catholic College.

== History ==
The school was founded from the amalgamation of Seafield Convent Grammar and St Bede's Secondary Modern in 1977, despite the differences of opinions from parents and governors on the merger proposals . The Crosby Catholic Parents for Comprehensive Education supported the plans, noting it was "exactly what they had proposed" several years prior in 1973, although others considered the proposals as "hasty", particularly as the provision for single-sex education was being removed.

It accepts boys and girls, primarily from its Catholic feeder primary schools from the local area, including St. Edmund's and St. Thomas' Catholic Primary and Nursery School, Great Crosby Catholic Primary School and Ursuline Catholic Primary School.

The school is split across two sites. The upper site (which deals with Year 7, Year 8, Year 9, Year 10 and Year 11) is the former Seafield Convent building, whilst the lower site, on Myers Road East, is the former St Bede's. The sites are within a short walk of each other. The school's upper site was used as a setting for the film Nowhere Boy.

Previously a voluntary aided school administered by Sefton Council, in July 2022 Sacred Heart Catholic College converted to academy status. The school is now sponsored by the Pope Francis Multi Academy Trust. the school continues to be under the jurisdiction of the Roman Catholic Archdiocese of Liverpool.

== Inspections ==
As of 2026, the school's last inspection by Ofsted was in 2024, with a judgement of Requires Improvement.

== Notable former pupils ==
=== Seafield Convent ===
- Cherie Blair KC, lawyer, wife of Prime Minister Tony Blair

=== St Bede's Secondary Modern ===
- Kenny Everett, comedian

=== Sacred Heart Catholic High School/College ===
- Victor Anichebe, football player
- Chris Doyle, football player
- Iffy Onuora, football player
