= Mount Maria (disambiguation) =

Mount Maria is a mountain in the Falkland Islands.

Mount Maria may also refer to:

- Mount Maria, Malaysia, a volcanic cone mountain
- Mount Maria, Queensland, Australia, a rural locality
- The highest point on Maria Island, off the coast of Tasmania, Australia

== See also ==
- Mount Moriah (disambiguation)
