= Religious of the Sacred Heart of Mary =

Global Roman Catholic community

The RSHM symbol is the Cross worn by the sisters. The words on the cross, Ut Vitam Habeant mean: "That They May Have Life" (Jn. 10:10)

The Religious of the Sacred Heart of Mary (known in the United States as the RSHM and in other parts of the world as RSCM) are a global Roman Catholic community of about 900 apostolic religious women. The institute was founded in 1849 in Béziers, France by Father Jean Gailhac and Appollonie Pelissier-Cure. Today the diversity of ministries include educational, pastoral and social services.

The community is not to be confused with the Religious of the Sacred Heart, another name for the Society of the Sacred Heart, who use the abbreviation RSCJ.

== History ==
The Institute of the Religious of the Sacred Heart of Mary (RSHM) was founded on February 24, 1849 in Béziers, France by Fr. Jean Gailhac and Appollonie Pelissier-Cure, (Mother St. Jean). A group of women gathered together to form a community which took over the direction of a shelter for women and an orphanage. The Institute grew rapidly and by the time the original group made their first profession in May 1851 their number had grown to ten. During her time as superior, a boarding school for girls was begun. In a short time, the sisters expanded their ministry beyond France.

The rule of life of the Religious of the Sacred Heart of Mary, the RSHM Constitutions, was approved on the diocesan level in 1850, the canonical level in 1880 and revised in 1983.

== Government ==
The major authority of the Religious of the Sacred Heart of Mary is the General Superior, who, with the General Council have residence in Rome, Italy. Smaller units of the institute, known as Provinces, have their own government in relationship to the general government. The general chapter sets goals and establishes priorities for the Institute, and elects the Institute leadership team. The smallest unit of government is the local community, who, with a local coordinator, work in relationship with the provincial.

== Provinces ==
Provincial government is divided into Provinces and Regions. The RSHM provinces are as follows:

- Eastern American Province. Includes Northern and Southern United States, Missouri and international schools in England, France and Italy.
- Western American Province. Includes California and Mexico.
- Northern European Province. Includes England, Ireland, Wales, Scotland and France
- Brazilian Province. Includes Brazil
- Portuguese Province. Includes Portugal and Mali
- Region of Mozambique. Includes Mozambique
- Zambezi Region. Includes Zambia and Zimbabwe

== Apostolate ==
As of 2023, the community serves in 14 countries. RSHM work in colleges and universities, secondary and elementary schools. RSHM serve in parishes and prisons, in hospitals and nursing homes, in studios and social centers, in retreat houses and retirement homes. Religious of the Sacred Heart of Mary are administrators, teachers, social workers, artists, lawyers, health care personnel, musicians, librarians, spiritual directors, and others.

== Schools ==
=== Europe ===
- Marymount International School, London, United Kingdom
- Sacred Heart of Mary Girls' School, London, United Kingdom
- Seafield Convent Grammar School, Crosby, United Kingdom (merged to become Sacred Heart Catholic College)
- Marymount International School, Paris, France
- Istituto Marymount, Rome, Italy
- Marymount International School of Rome, Italy
- Colégio do Sagrado Coração de Maria - Fátima, Fátima, Portugal
- Colégio do Sagrado Coração de Maria, Lisbon, Portugal
- Colégio de Nossa Senhora do Rosário, Porto, Portugal
- Rathmore Grammar School Belfast, Northern Ireland

=== North America ===
- Colegio Marymount, Cuernavaca, Mexico
- Corvallis High School, Studio City, United States (closed)
- Marymount High School, Los Angeles, United States
- Marymount School of New York, New York City, United States
- Sacred Heart of Mary High School, Montebello, United States (merged to become Cantwell-Sacred Heart of Mary High School)
- Mother Butler Memorial High School, San Jose, United States (closed)

There was a Marymount school in the City of Québec from the early 1950s to 1969, initially located on Mont Carmel street in Old Quebec, moving to its own large campus St. Foy. Other secondary schools and junior colleges were founded in Ferguson and Florissant, Missouri, and Rolling Meadows, Illinois.

=== South America ===
- Marymount School Bogotá, Bogotá, Colombia
- Marymount School Medellín, Medellín, Colombia
- Marymount International School, Barranquilla, Colombia
- Colégio Sagrado Coração de Maria, Belo Horizonte, Brazil
- Colégio Sagrado Coração de Maria, Rio de Janeiro, Brazil
- Colégio Sagrado Coração de Maria, Brasília, Brazil
- Colégio Sagrado Coração de Maria, Ubá, Brazil
- Colégio Sagrado Coração de Maria, Vitória, Brazil

== Colleges and tertiary institutions ==
=== United States ===
- Loyola Marymount University, Los Angeles, California (co-sponsored with the Society of Jesus)
- Marymount University, Arlington, Virginia

==== Closed ====
- Marymount California University, Rancho Palos Verdes, California (closed in 2022)
- Marymount Manhattan College, New York City (became non-sectarian in 1961, absorbed into Northeastern University in 2026)
- Marymount College, Tarrytown, New York (absorbed by Fordham in 2002, closed in 2007)

== RSHM and justice ==
As a religious institute and a non-governmental organization (NGO), RSHM place its resources at the service of those who are most in need of justice, enabling those in need to work towards their own development and liberation.

== Bibliography ==
- Connell, Kathleen, RSHM. A Journey in Faith and Time: History of the Religious of the Sacred Heart of Mary. Vol. 2: The Growth of the Institute: The Foundations during Mother St. Croix Vidal's Leadership 1869–1878. Religious of the Sacred Heart of Mary, 1995.
- Gailhac, Venerável P. Jean. Cartas, Vol. I and II.
- Gailhac, R. P. The Religious Life. New York, 1934. English translation of R. P. Gailhac, La Vie Religieuse. 2 vols. Lille, 1892.
- Leray, Abbé F. Un Apôtre: Le Père Gailhac (1802–1890), Fondateur des Religieuses du Sacre Coeur de Marie. Paris: Éditions Spes, 1939.
- Maymard, V. Beatification and canonization of the servant of God, John Gailhac, priest and founder of the Institute of the Sacred Heart of Mary: inquiry into the historical value of Father V. Maymard's biography. Sacred Congregation of Rites, Historical Section. Westminster, MD: Christian Classics, 1977.
- Milligan, Mary, RSHM. "That They May Have Life": A Study of the Spirit-Charism of Father Jean Gailhac, Founder. Dissertatione Ad Doctoratum, Pontificiae Universitatis Gregorianae, 1975.
- Sampaio, Rosa do Carmo, RSHM. A Journey in Faith and Time: History of the Religious of the Sacred Heart of Mary. Vol. 1: The Birth of the Institute: Its Development during Mother Saint Jean's Lifetime 1802–1869. Religious of the Sacred Heart of Mary, 1995.
