= Mount Mary (Alaska) =

Mountain summit in Alaska, United States

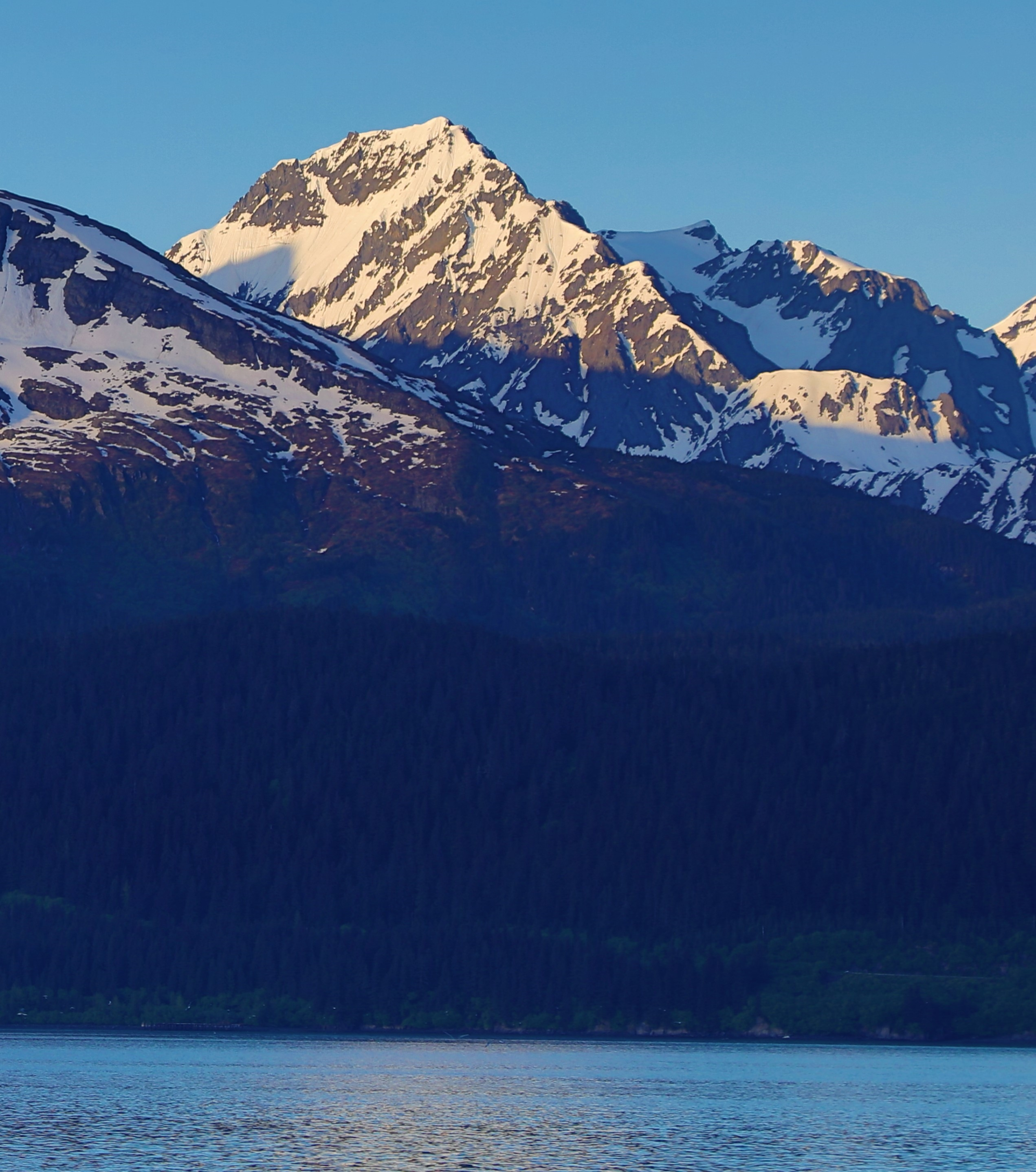
- West aspect

Highest point
- Elevation: 4,820 ft (1,469 m)
- Prominence: 1,533 ft (467 m)
- Parent peak: Mount Alice
- Isolation: 2.08 mi (3.35 km)
- Coordinates: 60°06′56″N 149°13′52″W

Geography
- Location within Alaska
- Interactive map of Mount Mary
- Country: United States
- State: Alaska
- Borough: Kenai Peninsula
- Protected area: Chugach National Forest
- Parent range: Kenai Mountains
- Topo map: USGS Seward A-6

Mount Mary is a 4,820-foot-elevation (1,469-meter) mountain summit in Alaska, United States.

== Description ==
Mount Mary is located seven miles (11 km) east of Seward in the Kenai Mountains, on land managed by Chugach National Forest. Precipitation runoff and glacial meltwater from the mountain drains west to Resurrection Bay via Fourth of July Creek. Although modest in elevation, topographic relief is significant as the summit rises 3,800 feet (1,158 m) above the creek in 1.65 miles (2.66 km). The mountain's toponym was officially adopted June 13, 2019, by the United States Board on Geographic Names. The mountain is named for Mary Lowell (1855–1906), the matriarch of a family of early settlers of Seward. She was the mother of Alice (Mount Alice) and Eva (Mount Eva).

== Climate ==
Based on the Köppen climate classification, Mount Mary is located in a tundra climate zone with long, cold, snowy winters, and mild summers. Weather systems coming off the Gulf of Alaska are forced upwards by the Kenai Mountains (orographic lift), causing heavy precipitation in the form of rainfall and snowfall. Winter temperatures can drop below 0 °F with wind chill factors below −10 °F. This climate supports the Godwin Glacier which partially surrounds the peak.

== Gallery ==
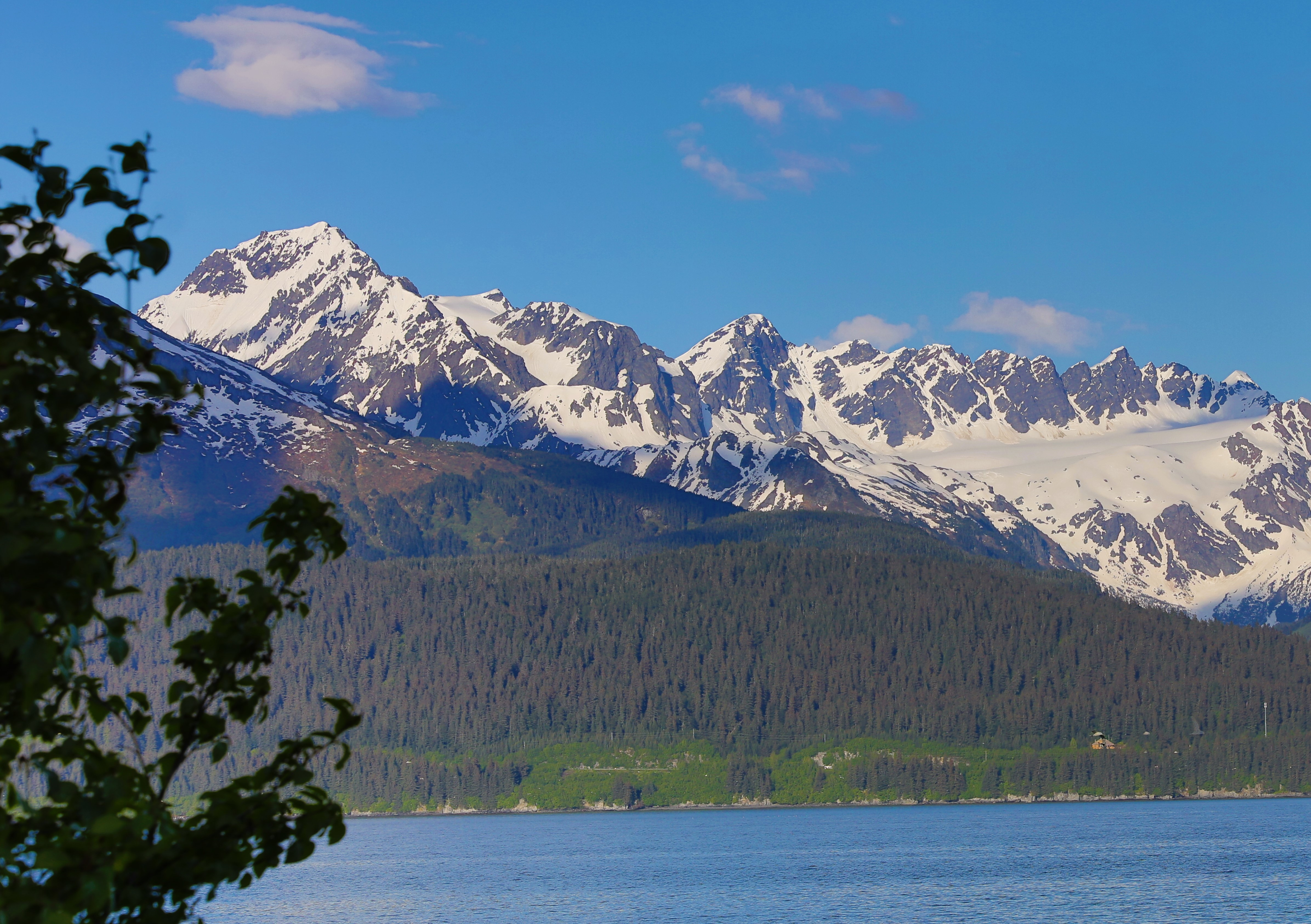
Mt. Mary to the left

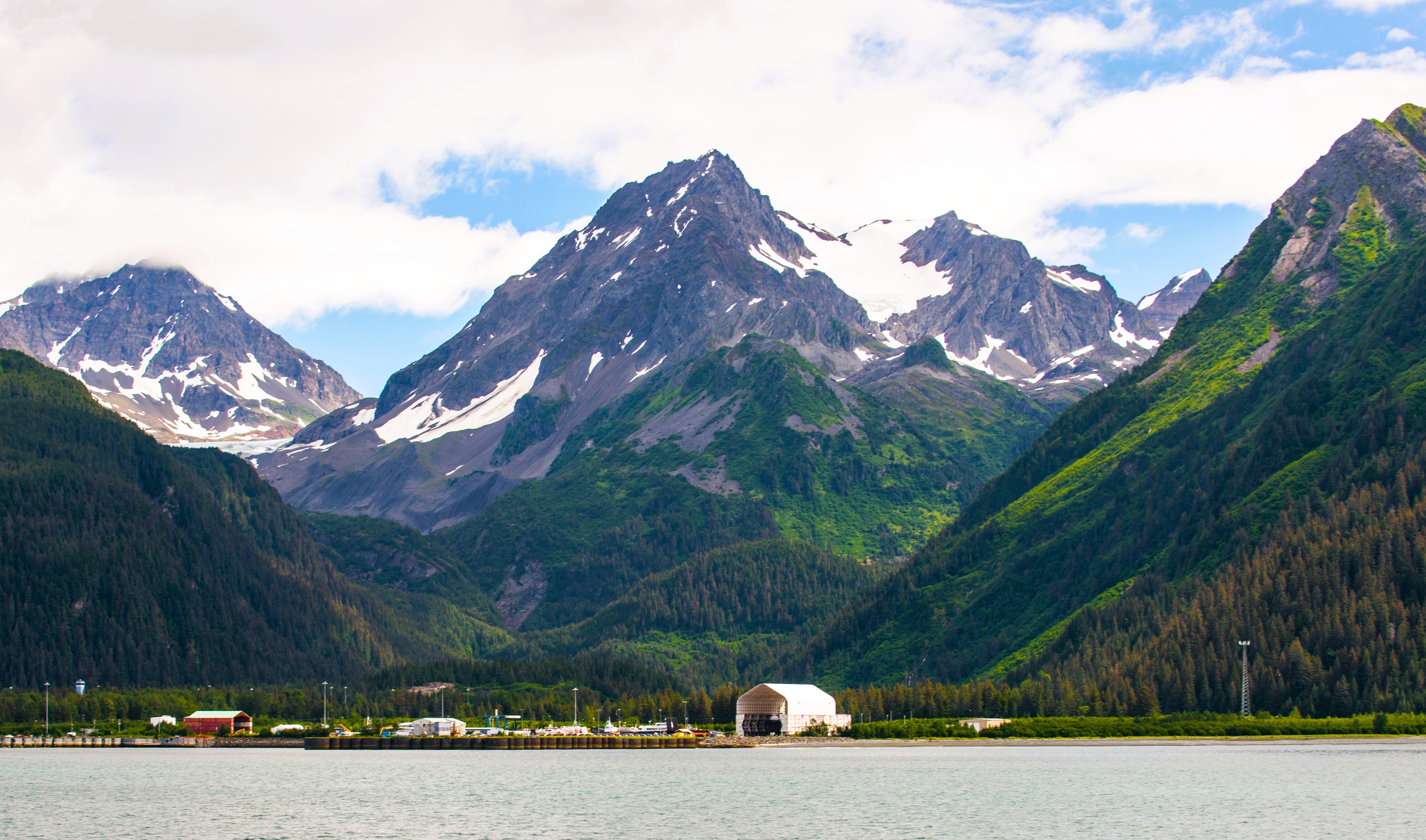
Mt. Mary from southwest

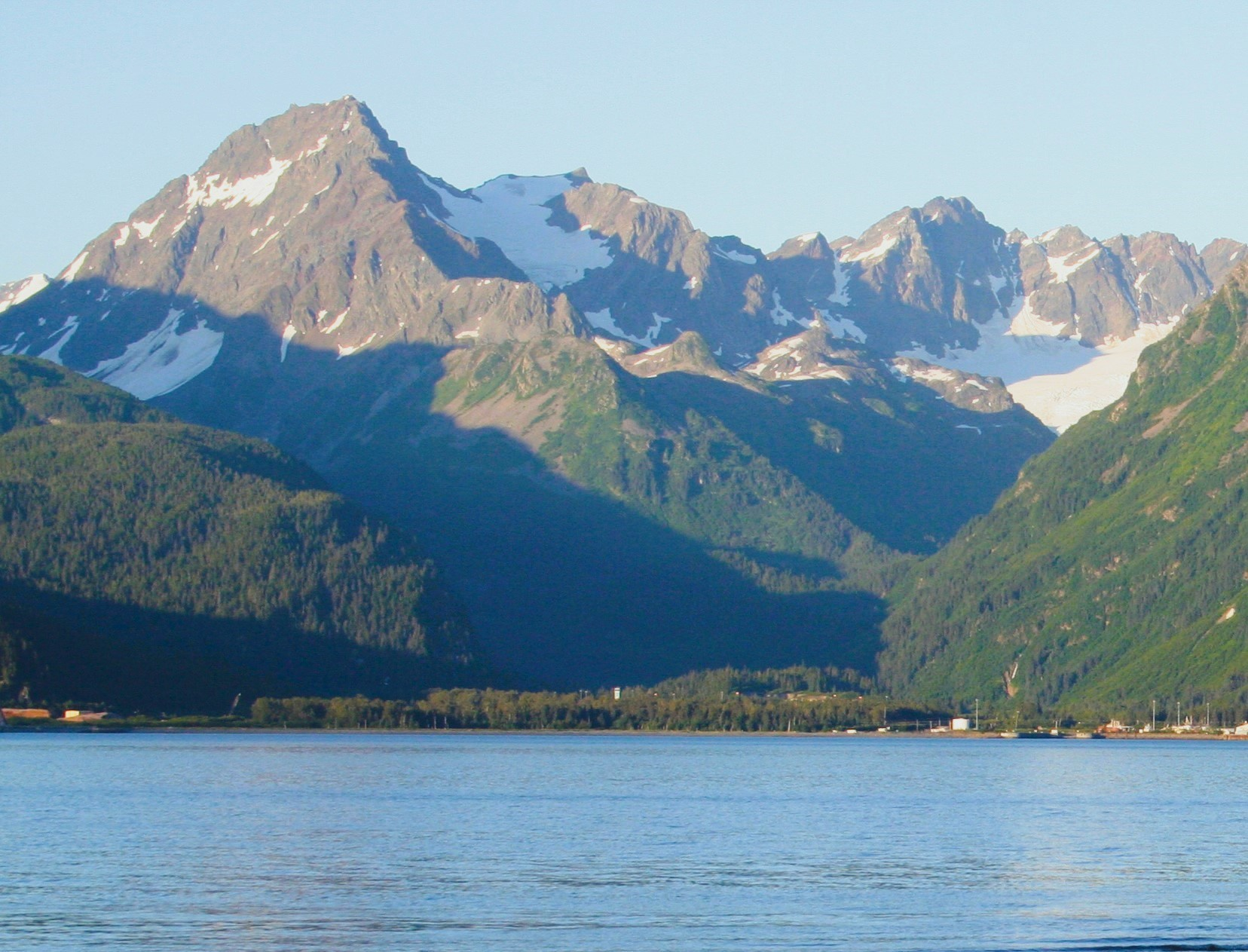
Mt. Mary from southwest

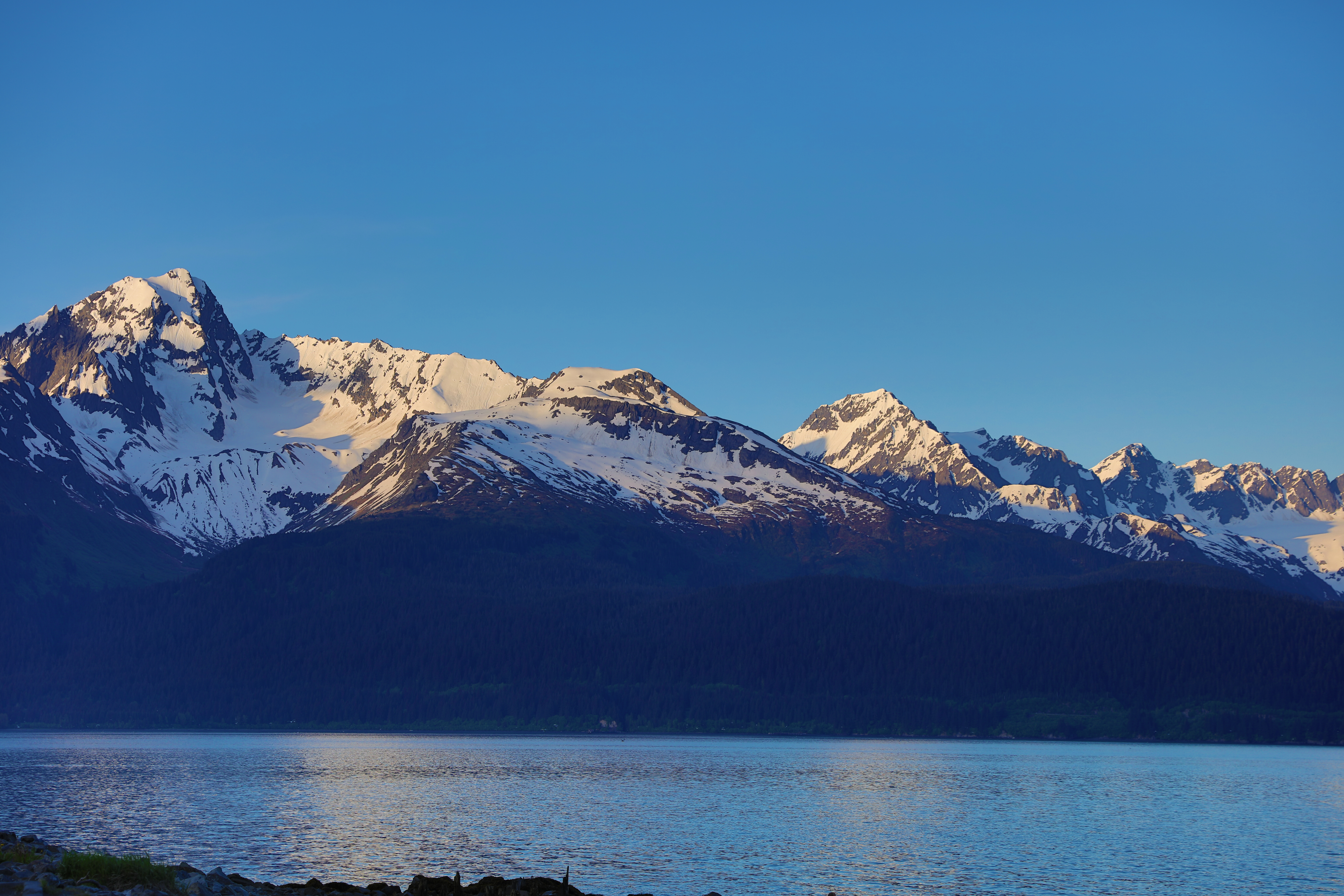
Mt. Alice (left) and Mt. Mary (right)

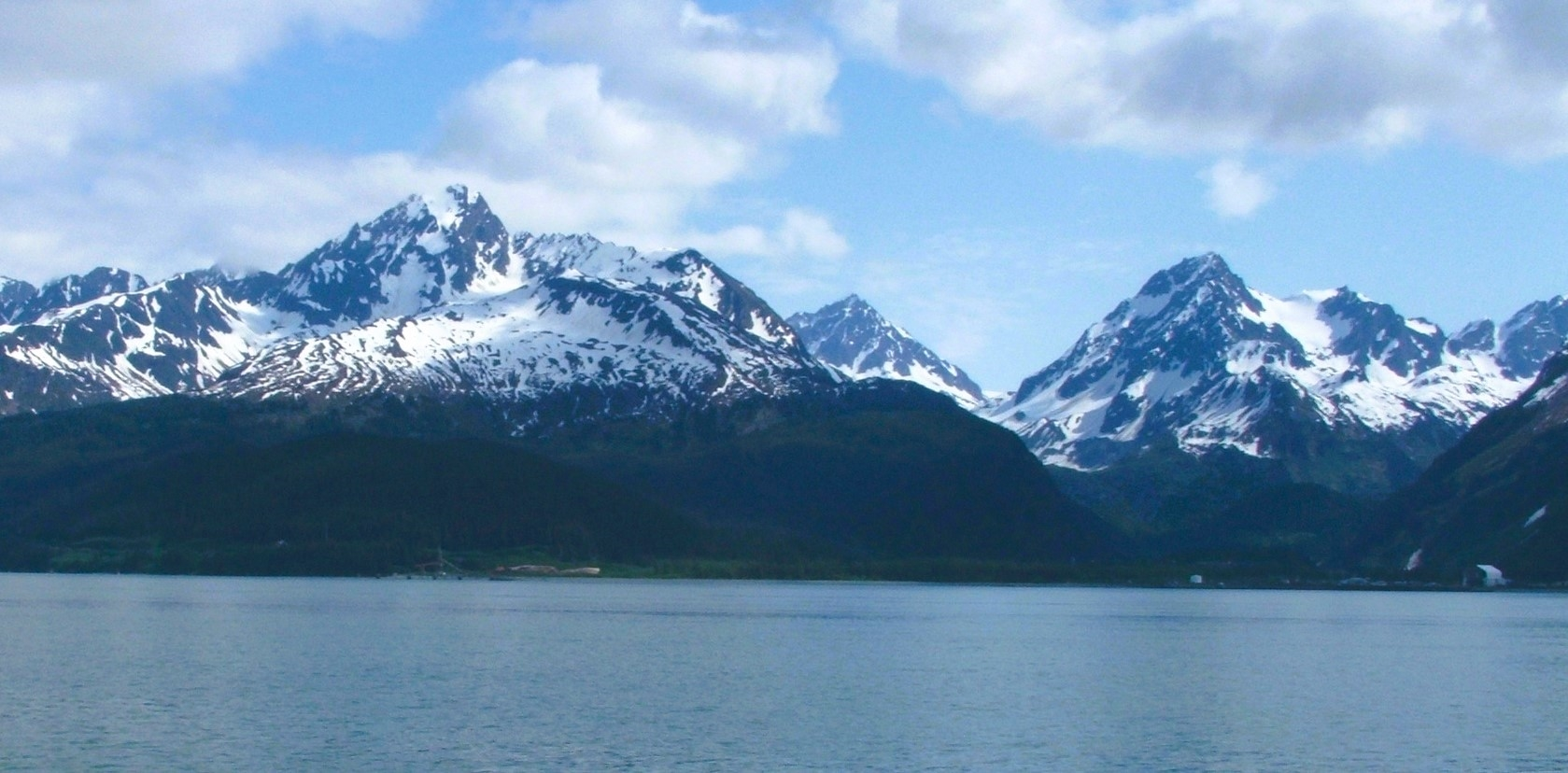
Mt. Alice (left) and Mt. Mary (right)

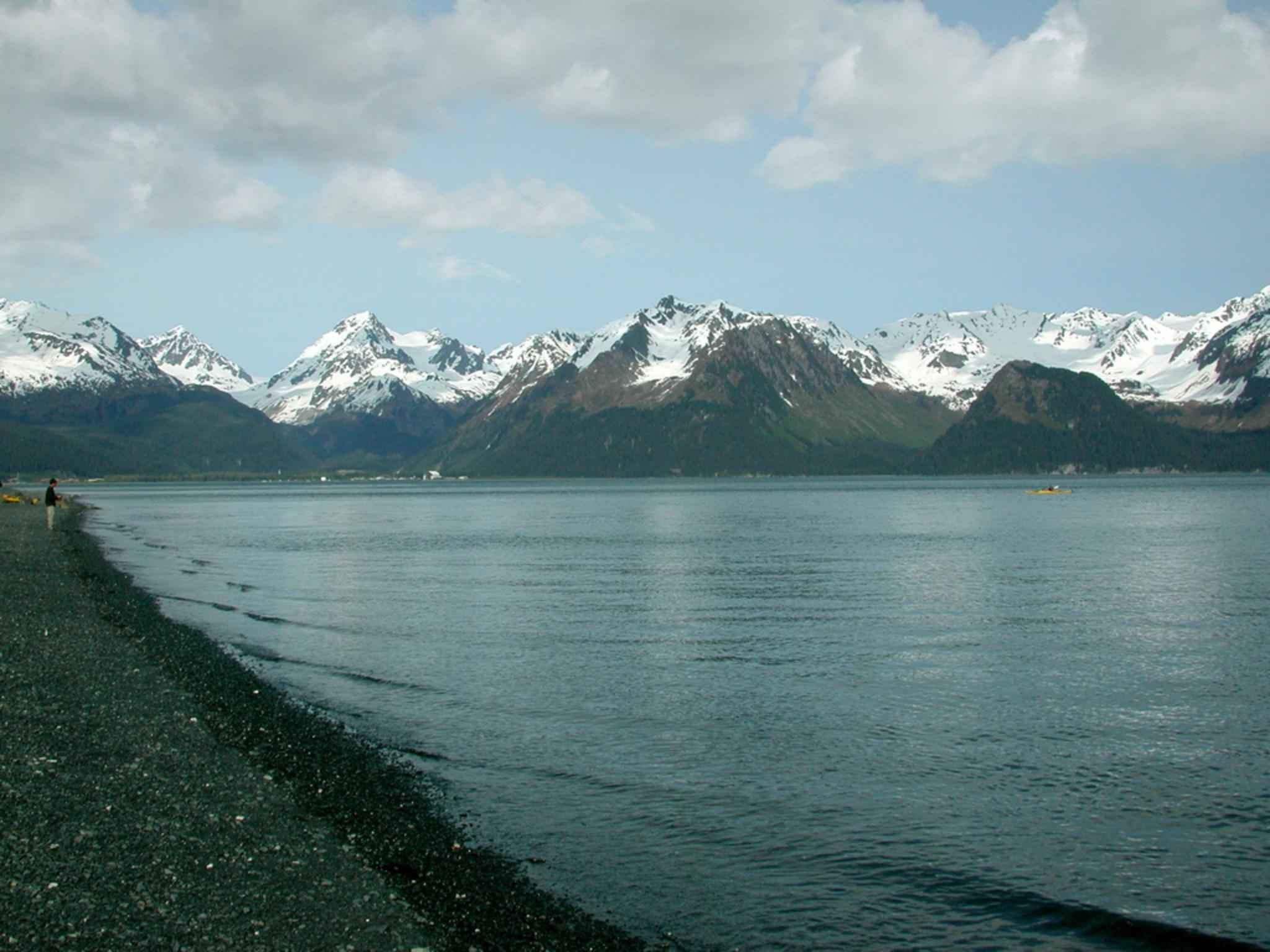
Mt. Mary left of center

== See also ==
- List of mountain peaks of Alaska
- Geography of Alaska
