= Marymount International School London =

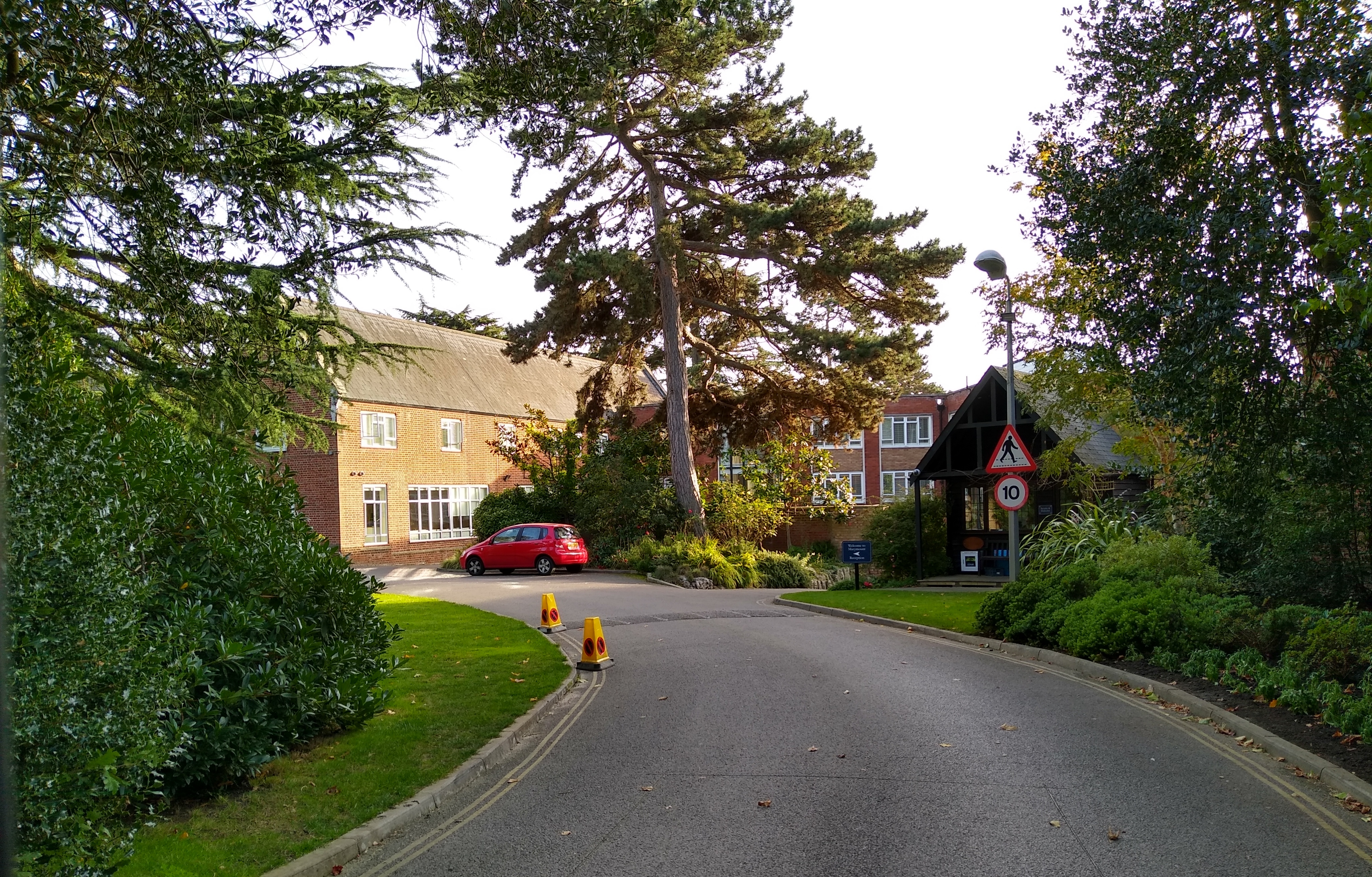

Location
- George Road; Kingston upon Thames, KT2 7PE; England; 51°25′01″N 0°16′08″W

Information
- Type: Independent day and boarding school International school
- Motto: Spes Salus Consolatio Nostra (Our hope, our health, and our consolation)
- Religious affiliation: Roman Catholic
- Established: 1955
- Founder: Religious of the Sacred Heart of Mary
- Local authority: Kingston upon Thames
- Department for Education URN: 102615 Tables
- Chair of the Governors: Cristina Serrano Saenz de Tejada
- Headmistress: Margaret Giblin
- Staff: 87~
- Gender: Girls
- Age: 11 to 18
- Enrolment: 250~
- Houses: 4
- Colours: Navy blue, white
- Campus: 7-acre (0.028 km^{2}) rural campus
- Website: www.marymountlondon.com

Marymount International School London is an Independent day and boarding school for 250 girls in Kingston upon Thames, London. It is the UK's only all-years International Baccalaureate (IB) World School for girls, and one of the most expensive private schools in Britain and it is selective. The school has a financial aid program which currently awards more than $8 million annually to British charities.

The campus is situated on seven acres of suburban parklands, twelve miles from London. The secondary school segment is divided into 4 houses; two for middle school students, one for IB Year 1 candidates, and one for IB Year 2 candidates. Aside from the main mansion house, the London campus has a number of sports facilities, staff and faculty residences, and other buildings. Marymount London also owns and operates a speech, drama, and music program with The London Academy of Music and Dramatic Art.

Marymount London is included in The Schools Index of the world's 150 best private schools and among Tatler's leading international schools in the UK.

== History ==
Marymount International School London was founded in 1955 by the Religious of the Sacred Heart of Mary to educate young heiresses of overseas business and aristocratic dynasties in the UK. In 1979 it became the first school in the United Kingdom to fully adopt the International Baccalaureate programme as its main curriculum of instruction.

== Academics ==
Marymount follows the International Baccalaureate's Middle Years Programme (MYP) for girls aged 11 to 16, and the Diploma Programme for the last two years. As an international school it mainly attracts children from overseas families, but also accepts local students.

The school achieves academic results that are above the global average. The class of 2022 averaged 37 points on the IB Diploma, with 33% of graduating students scoring 40 points or above, a score only achieved by approximately 5% of students worldwide. In 2011, 20% of Marymount IB Diploma candidates received a score of 40 points or higher.

Marymount is a fully accredited IB World School and is also accredited by the Council of International Schools and the Middle States Association of Colleges and Schools (USA). It is a member of the Girls' Schools Association.

== Student life ==
Marymount is an international school which caters to a diverse student population and incorporates aspects of both the American and British educational traditions. The British-style blazer is part of the prescribed uniform and the house system is an integral part of student life. American nomenclature for year groups is used, meaning there is no "sixth form" as the final year of secondary education (age 17/18) is grade 12 rather than year 13 ("Upper Sixth"). Student leaders are elected into a "Student Council" and the head of the council is known as a president rather than head girl. In the middle of the school year, grade 10 and 11 students are elected into the National Honor Society. A formal graduation ceremony is held at the end of the year to farewell grade 12 students.

== Houses ==
The four houses are named after founders of the Religious of the Sacred Heart of Mary.

- St Jean
- St Constance
- St Felix
- St Croix

== Boarding ==
Boarding is an option to all students and about a quarter of the student body are boarders. They are housed in four main halls and cared for by houseparents and a resident nurse. Younger boarders usually reside in triple rooms and older students are allocated either double or single rooms.

== Pastoral Care ==
As a Catholic school, spiritual life is an important aspect of student life. Students are expected to attend chapel services and invited to actively participate. A Sacrament of Confirmation is held every two years.

Students may also take part in community service projects through exchange programmes with its sister schools in the RSHM international network of schools.

== Notable alumnae ==
- Mia Farrow, American actress
