= Mary Mount =

Mary Mount may refer to:

- Mary Cameron (mother of David Cameron), née Mary Mount
- Mary's Mount, historic home in Maryland, USA

== See also ==
- Marymount (disambiguation)
- Merrymount (disambiguation)
