= Marymount International School Barranquilla =

Marymount School Barranquilla
- Colegio Marymount Barranquilla
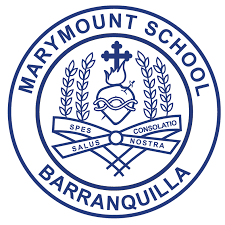
- School logo

Location
- Km 5 vía Sabanilla; Puerto Colombia, Atlántico Department, Atlántico; Colombia

Information
- Type: Private, Catholic, bilingual, co-educational K–12 school
- Religious affiliation: Catholic Church
- Denomination: Religious of the Sacred Heart of Mary
- Established: 1953
- Founder: Religious of the Sacred Heart of Mary
- Head teacher: Anabella Martínez
- Faculty: 161
- Grades: Early Childhood – Grade 12
- Enrollment: 1,228
- Language: English and Spanish
- Accreditation: New England Association of Schools and Colleges (NEASC); Council of International Schools (CIS)
- Website: www.marymountbq.edu.co

Marymount School Barranquilla (Spanish: Colegio Marymount Barranquilla), commonly referred to as Marymount, is a private, Catholic, co-educational bilingual K–12 school serving the metropolitan area of Barranquilla, Colombia. Founded in 1953 by the Religious of the Sacred Heart of Mary (RSHM), the school is part of the international RSHM Network of Schools.

The institution operates a preschool campus in Barranquilla and an elementary and secondary campus in Puerto Colombia, Atlántico Department.

== History ==
Marymount School Barranquilla was founded in 1953 by members of the Religious of the Sacred Heart of Mary at the request of Marymount alumnae living in Barranquilla. It initially operated in a private residence in the city.

The school was originally established as an all-girls institution and became co-educational in 1981 with the admission of male students.

Marymount operates under authorization from the Colombian Ministry of Education (Resolution No. 00487 of April 4, 2003).

The school received accreditation from the New England Association of Schools and Colleges (NEASC) in 2010 and from the Council of International Schools (CIS) in 2011. CIS renewed accreditation in 2021 and again in December 2025.

== Campuses ==
Marymount operates two campuses:

- Preschool campus: Carrera 59 #84-226, Barranquilla
- Elementary and secondary campus: Km 5 vía Sabanilla, Puerto Colombia

== Governance and administration ==
Marymount School Barranquilla is governed by a Board of Trustees composed of members of the school community. As of the mid-2020s, the board is chaired by Patricia Olarte de Gómez, with María de los Ángeles Fernández Franco serving as vice president.

The head of school is Anabella Martínez, EdD.

== Enrollment and faculty ==
According to the school's 2025–2026 institutional profile, Marymount enrolls 1,228 students from approximately 810 families and employs 161 teachers.

Enrollment by division is reported as:

- Preschool: 256 students
- Lower Elementary: 256 students
- Upper Elementary: 249 students
- Middle School: 232 students
- High School: 235 students

Approximately 69% of faculty hold postgraduate degrees, and about 12% are international teachers.

== Academic structure ==
Marymount organizes instruction into five divisions:

- Preschool (Nursery–Kinder)
- Lower Elementary (Grades 1–3)
- Upper Elementary (Grades 4–6)
- Middle School (Grades 7–9)
- High School (Grades 10–12)

The academic calendar includes approximately 180 instructional days divided into three trimesters.

== Curriculum ==
Marymount School Barranquilla operates a bilingual curriculum combining Colombian national requirements with international academic frameworks.

Beginning in 2019, the school incorporated the Cambridge Assessment International Education curriculum in English, mathematics, and science.

Students complete:

- Cambridge Primary Checkpoint (Grade 5)
- Cambridge Lower Secondary Checkpoint (Grade 8)
- IGCSE coursework (introduced Grade 10 in 2023–2024)
- AS Level coursework (introduced Grades 11–12 beginning 2024–2025)

Other curriculum frameworks used across subject areas include:

- AERO Standards (social sciences)
- Common European Framework of Reference for Languages (French)
- ISTE Standards (technology)
- SHAPE America (physical education)
- NAFME (music and arts)
- AASL (library sciences)

== Language program ==
Marymount describes its instructional model as additive bilingualism. Preschool students receive approximately 90% of instruction in English, with Spanish instruction increasing in later grades to meet Colombian national examination requirements.

== Secondary program ==
High school students complete four years of coursework totaling approximately 35 academic credits, along with:

- Colombia's national exit examination (Saber 11)
- a senior capstone project (Explore Horizons)
- 80 hours of community service

Students may pursue emphasis tracks aligned with university preparation, including:

- Advanced Mathematics and Engineering
- Advanced Mathematics and Economics
- Advanced Biology and Science
- Advanced Economics and Humanities
- Advanced Arts and Design

Graduates receive both the Colombian Bachillerato diploma and a U.S. high school diploma.

== Student life ==
Marymount offers extracurricular programs through the Marymount Athletic and Cultural Club (MACC), including sports, performing arts, and visual arts activities. Programs include volleyball, basketball, swimming, gymnastics, soccer, baseball, karate, skating, dance, choir, band, guitar, piano, violin, and visual arts.

Student support services include counseling, neuropsychological services, nursing services, and academic accommodations within a multi-tiered system of support framework.

== Affiliations ==
Marymount School Barranquilla is part of the international RSHM Network of Schools, which includes institutions in Colombia, Brazil, Mexico, the United States, and Europe.

The school is accredited by the New England Association of Schools and Colleges and the Council of International Schools and is recognized as a Cambridge International School.

== Higher education outcomes ==
According to its institutional profile, Marymount reports that all graduates continue to higher education, with approximately half pursuing studies outside Colombia. Destinations listed in recent school profiles include universities in Colombia, the United States, Canada, Europe, and Latin America.

== Notable alumni ==
- Cecilia Álvarez-Correa Glen, Minister of Commerce, Industry and Tourism
- Yaneth Giha Tovar, Minister of Education
- Elsa Noguera, Politician and economist
- Mauricio Gómez Amín, Lawyer and politician
- Adriana Tarud, Miss Colombia 2004
- Sofia Vergara, Model and Actress
- Natalia Abello Vives, Minister of Transport of Colombia
