= Jean Gailhac =

French Catholic priest

Venerable Fr Jean Gailhac
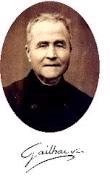
- Born: 13 November 1802; Béziers, France
- Died: 25 January 1890 (aged 87)
- Known for: Founder of the Religious of the Sacred Heart of Mary
- Religion: Christianity
- Church: Roman Catholic Church
- Ordained: 23 September 1826

Jean Gailhac (13 November 1802 – 1890) was a French Roman Catholic priest. He founded the Religious of the Sacred Heart of Mary in 1849.

== Life ==
Pierre Jean Antoine Gailhac was born on 13 November 1802 in Béziers, France. He entered the major seminary in Montpellier in 1821 and was ordained by Bishop Nicolas Fournier for the Diocese of Montpellier on 23 September 1826. As a young priest he taught philosophy and helped in the religious formation of the students at the seminary.

On 12 September 1828, Father Jean Gailhac was assigned as chaplain to the civil and military hospital of the city of Béziers where he met many women who suffered from illnesses which were the result of prostitution. These women were mostly uneducated and had neither family nor social support. At first, Gailhac made arrangements for many of these women to be received in a shelter in Montpellier, paying their room and board. With the help of friends, in 1834 he founded the Good Shepherd, a shelter for these women. Women started bringing Gailhac children for whom they could not longer care so an orphanage was formed in part of the building.

Over the course of the years, Father Gailhac spoke with his friends Eugene Cure and his wife Appollonie. Gailhac opened a second home for young women at risk and a boarding school for girls was begun. The Cures were devoted to the works that Father Gailhac had undertaken. In 1848 after the death of Eugene Cure, Appollonie Cure decided to devote her funds and her life to work for the education and help of these women and their children.

In 1849, Father Gailhac called together Appollonie Cure and five other women: Eulalie Vidal, Rosalie Gibbal, Rose Jeantet, Cécile Cambon, and Marie Roques to form the Religious of the Sacred Heart of Mary. Father Gailhac acted as their spiritual director and director of formation for these women who began their work in the Good Shepherd Refuge for women and the orphanage. Gailhac felt strongly that the purpose of the order should be the education of youth. He later added a boys' orphanage. Appollonie Cure, now Mother Saint Jean, was named the general superior of the new community.

As the Religious of the Sacred Heart of Mary grew and expanded to other countries and continents, Father Gailhac kept in contact with them through numerous letters, visits and spiritual treatises until his death on 25 January 1890. With the transfer of the RSHM Mother House in Béziers to the diocese of Montpellier, Gailhac's remains were moved to the nuns' vault in the old cemetery of Béziers.

Gailhac's spiritual writings were approved by theologians on 14 November 1952. Father Jean Gailhac was declared Venerable by the Roman Catholic Church in 1972. To mark the 220th anniversary of the founder's birth, the Religious of the Sacred Heart of Mary and their affiliates will be observing the Year of Jean Gailhac from the 13th of November 2022 and close on the 13th of November 2023 with various events planned.

The Jean Gailhac Association operates a Children's Home in Béziers. Le square Jean Gailhac in Beziers is named after him.

== Bibliography ==
- Gailhac, Venerável P. Jean. Cartas, Vol. I and II.
- Gailhac, R. P. The Religious Life. New York, 1934 (English translation of: Gailhac, R.P. La Vie Religieuse. 2 vols., Lille, 1892).
- Leray, Abbé F. Un Apôtre: Le Père Gailhac (1802–1890), Fondateur des Religieuses du Sacre Coeur de Marie. Paris: Éditions Spes, 1939.
- Magaret, Helene. Gailhac of Béziers. New York : Longmans, Green and Co., 1946
- Maymard, V. Beatification and canonization of the servant of God, John Gailhac, priest and founder of the Institute of the Sacred Heart of Mary: inquiry into the historical value of Father V. Maymard's biography: Sacred Congregation of Rites, Historical Section. Westminster, Md. : Christian Classics, 1977.
- Sampaio, Rosa do Carmo, RSHM. A Journey in Faith and Time: History of the Religious of the Sacred Heart of Mary. Vol. 1 The Birth of the Institute: Its Development during Mother Saint Jean's Lifetime 1802-1869. Religious of the Sacred Heart of Mary, 1995.

== Other sources ==
- RSHM Generalate, Rome. RSHM Archives
