= Mariemont =

Mariemont may refer to:

- Mariemont, Ohio, planned community in Hamilton County, Ohio, United States
- Château of Mariemont, former hunting estate created in 1546 by Queen Mary of Hungary
