= Marymount College, Tarrytown =

Women's college in Tarrytown, New York, US

Coordinates: 41°04′36″N 73°51′02″W

Marymount College of Fordham University
- Marymount College Seal
- Motto: Tua Luce Dirige: "Guide Us By Your Light" (college); Sapientia et Doctrina "Wisdom and Learning" (university)
- Type: Private
- Active: 1907–2007
- Location: Tarrytown, New York, US
- Campus: Suburb, 25 acres (100,000 m^{2})
- Colors: Blue and White; Maroon and White
- Nickname: Saints

Marymount College, Tarrytown (also known as Marymount College of Fordham University) was a women's college in the United States which eventually became part of Fordham University. The Marymount campus was located in Tarrytown, New York. The last class graduated in 2007, and the campus was sold in 2008.

== History ==
Marymount College of Fordham University coat-of-arms

In 1907, James Butler, the cousin of founder Johanna Butler (1860–1940) donated land near Tarrytown, New York for the founding of the college. The college was founded as an independent girls' boarding school by the Religious of the Sacred Heart of Mary (RSHM) to "create a place of learning where women could grow and where they could receive an education that would prepare them for positions of leadership and influence in the world." In February 1908, the school opened with six students.

=== Becoming a college ===
By 1918, the school offered an advanced two-year degree. In 1919, it obtained a provisional college charter. The charter became permanent in 1924, which is the year that Marymount began granting baccalaureate degrees. Marymount College at Tarrytown was the first of the several Marymount colleges founded by the RSHM. It was the first women's college in the United States to offer a study abroad program.

In 2000, Marymount entered into an agreement to consolidate with Fordham University. The college was renamed Marymount College of Fordham University. In October 2005, after two years of study, Fordham announced its plans to close Marymount in 2007. At the time, John N. Tognino, chair of the Fordham University Board of Trustees, explained that "despite the very best efforts of the faculty, administration and staff, it is no longer academically or financially feasible to continue to operate Marymount College as a separate school within the University".

In August 2007, Fordham announced it would sell the Marymount campus. The decision disappointed many alumnae, as the university had purchased the college with the promise that it would try to continue to operate it as a women's institution. The university claimed unjustifiable and disproportionate costs to maintain the large campus as reason for closure. Skeptics saw the acquisition of the college as a real estate flip. On February 17, 2008, Fordham announced the sale of the campus for $27 million to EF Education, a chain of private language-instruction schools.

== See also ==
- List of defunct colleges and universities in New York
- Marymount colleges
