= Lowell Peak =

Mountain in the state of Alaska

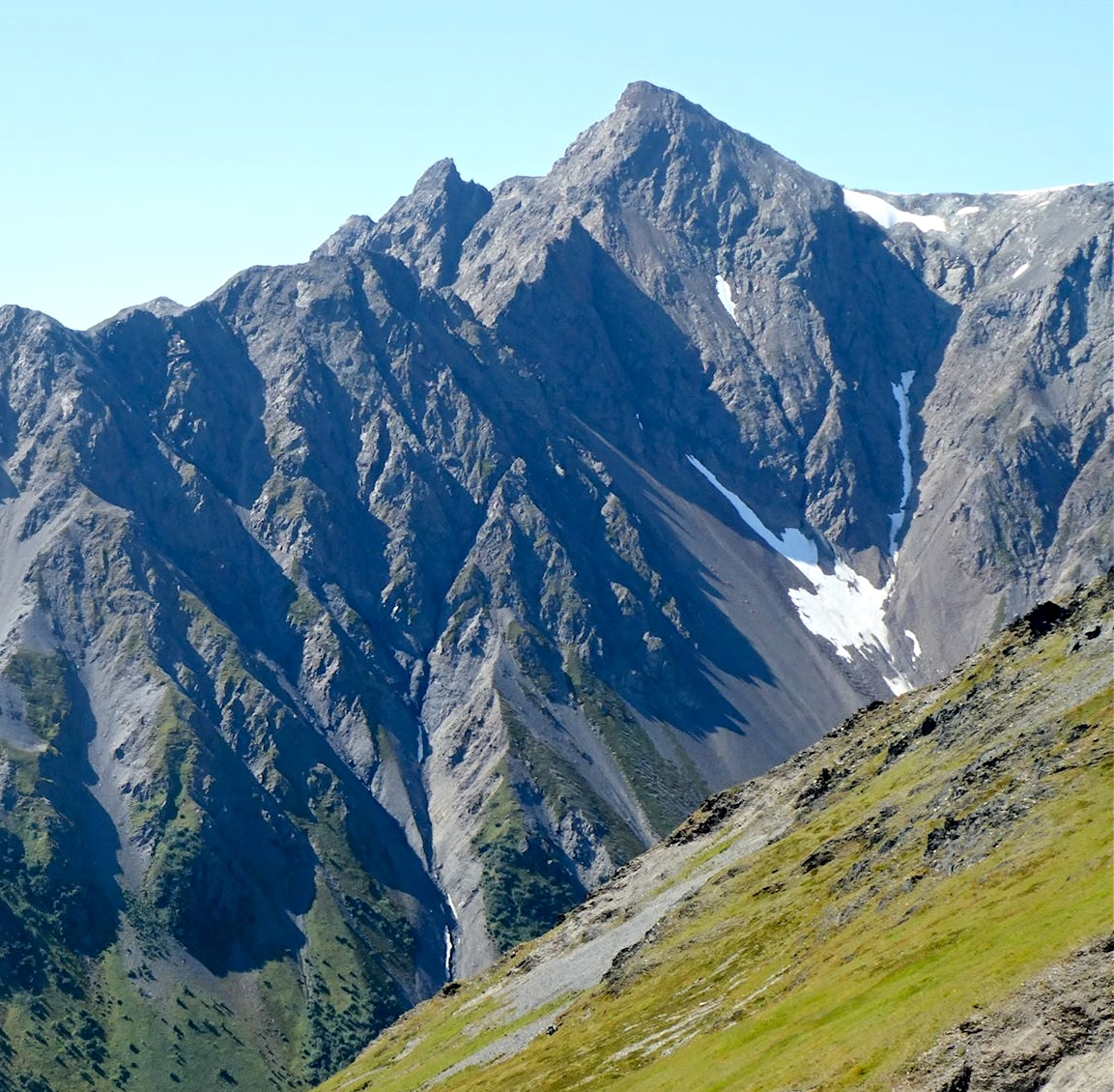
- North aspect seen from Marathon Mountain

Highest point
- Elevation: 4,416 ft (1,346 m)
- Prominence: 741 ft (226 m)
- Parent peak: Marathon Mountain
- Isolation: 1.4 mi (2.3 km)
- Coordinates: 60°05′27″N 149°31′39″W

Geography
- Location within Alaska
- Location: Chugach National Forest; Kenai Peninsula Borough; Alaska, United States
- Parent range: Kenai Mountains
- Topo map: USGS Seward A-7

Lowell Peak is a 4,416-foot (1,346 m) mountain summit located in the Kenai Mountains, on the Kenai Peninsula, in the U.S. state of Alaska. The peak is situated in Chugach National Forest, 1.2 mi (2 km) northwest of Bear Mountain, 1.5 mi (2 km) south-southwest of Marathon Mountain, 2.2 mi (4 km) south of Phoenix Peak, and 3 mi (5 km) west-southwest of Seward, Alaska. The months May and June offer the most favorable weather for viewing the mountain. In fair weather, the Harding Icefield can be seen from the summit, as well as Mount Alice on the opposite side of Resurrection Bay. This unofficially named peak takes its name from Franklin G. Lowell and his family who were the first homesteaders to settle the Seward area in 1883.

== Climate ==
Based on the Köppen climate classification, Lowell Peak is located in a subarctic climate zone with long, cold, snowy winters, and mild summers. Temperatures can drop below −20 °C with wind chill factors below −30 °C. This climate supports an unnamed glacier on the west slope of the peak. Precipitation runoff from the north slope of the mountain drains into Lowell Creek, and the south side drains into Spruce Creek, and both creeks empty into Resurrection Bay.

== Gallery ==
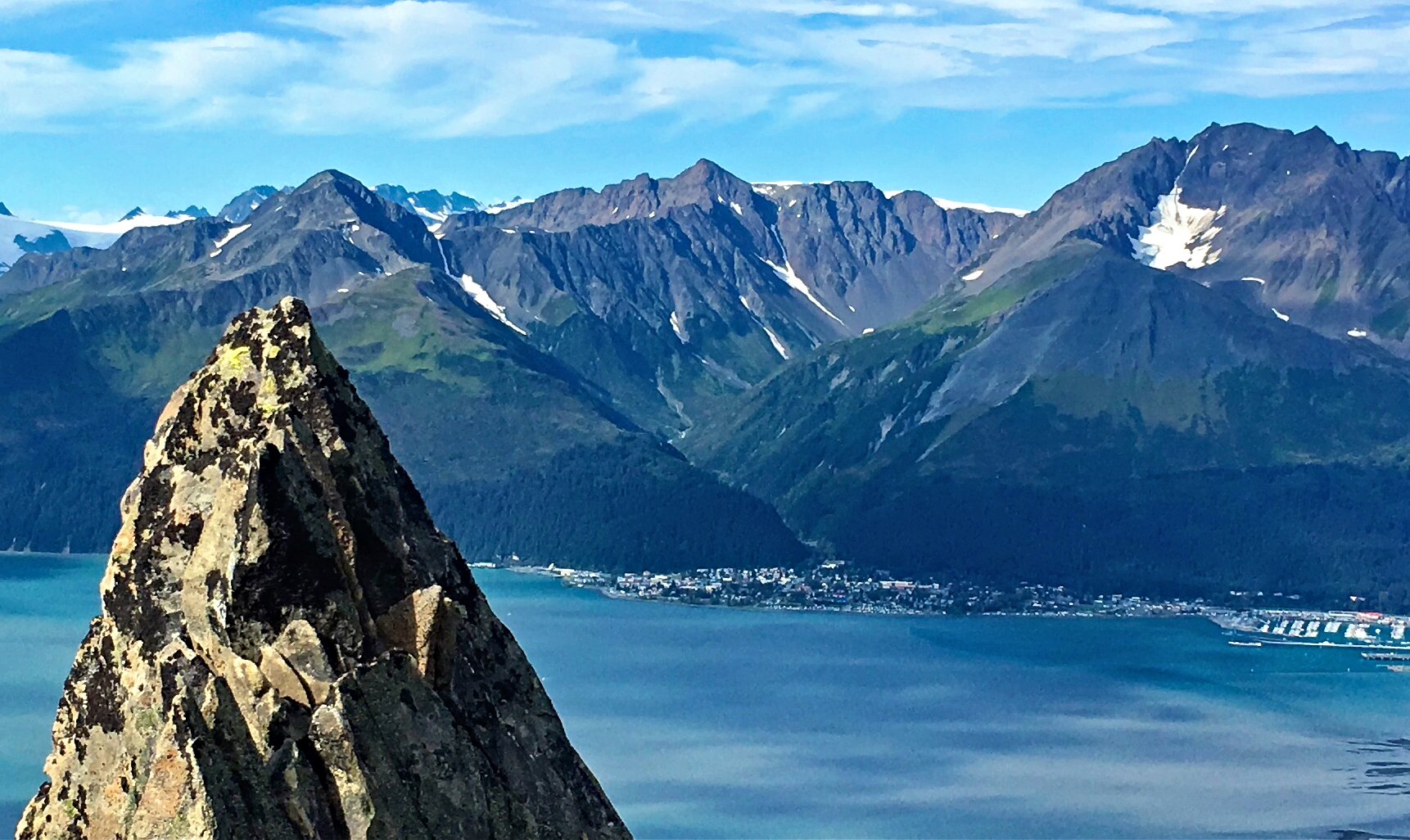
Lowell Peak centered in the distance behind Seward. Marathon Mountain to right

== See also ==
- List of mountain peaks of Alaska
- Geology of Alaska
