= Bear Mountain (Seward, Alaska) =

Mountain in Alaska, United States

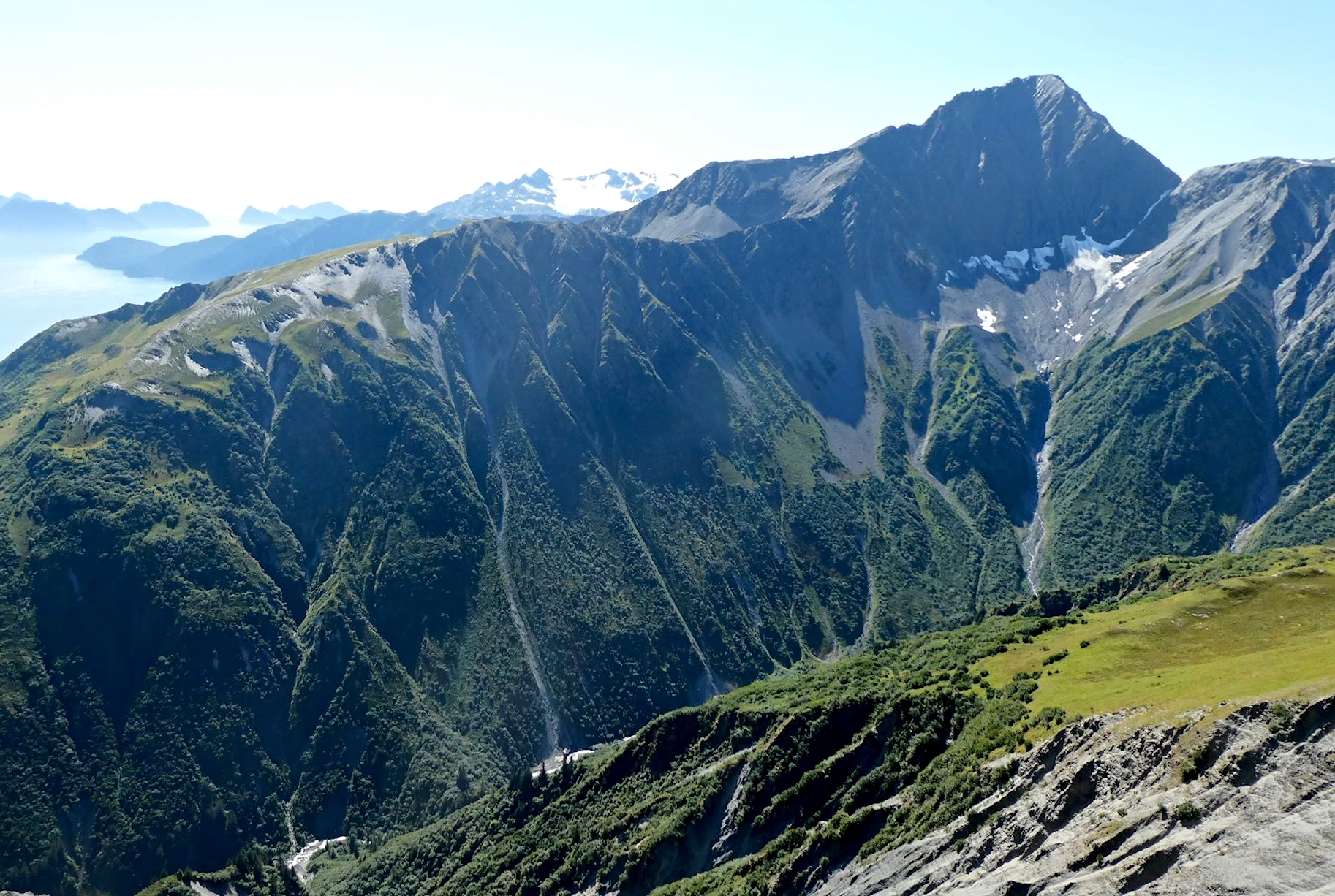
- North aspect seen from Marathon Mountain

Highest point
- Elevation: 4,019 ft (1,225 m)
- Prominence: 869 ft (265 m)
- Parent peak: Lowell Peak
- Isolation: 1.1 mi (1.8 km)
- Coordinates: 60°04′54″N 149°29′54″W

Geography
- Location within Alaska
- Country: United States
- State: Alaska
- Borough: Kenai Peninsula
- Protected area: Chugach National Forest
- Parent range: Kenai Mountains
- Topo map: USGS Seward A-7

Bear Mountain is a 4,019-foot (1,225 m) mountain summit located in the Kenai Mountains, on the Kenai Peninsula, in the U.S. state of Alaska. The peak is situated in Chugach National Forest, 5 mi (8 km) northeast of Bear Glacier, 2.1 mi (3 km) south-southeast of Marathon Mountain, and 5 mi (8 km) southwest of Seward, Alaska. The peak's local name was reported in 1951 by the U.S. Geological Survey. The months May and June offer the most favorable weather for viewing the mountain. In fair weather, the Harding Icefield can be seen from the summit.

== Climate ==
Based on the Köppen climate classification, Bear Mountain is located in a subarctic climate zone with long, cold, snowy winters, and mild summers. Temperatures can drop below −20 °C with wind chill factors below −30 °C. Precipitation runoff from the north slope of the mountain drains into Lowell Creek, and the south side drains into Spruce Creek, and both creeks empty into Resurrection Bay.

== Gallery ==
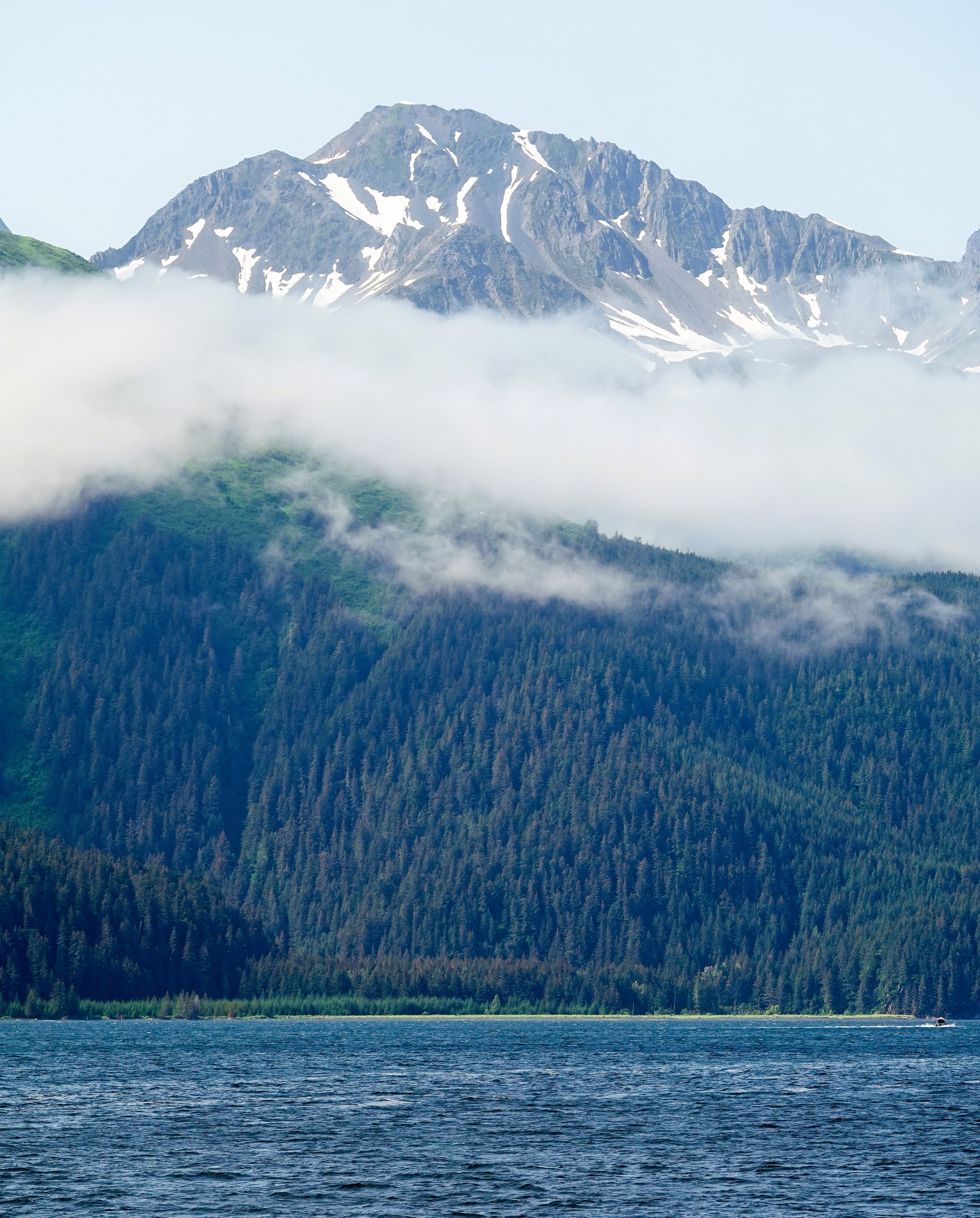
Southeast aspect of Bear Mountain

== See also ==
- List of mountain peaks of Alaska
- Geology of Alaska
