= Mount Adair =

Mountain in Alaska, United States

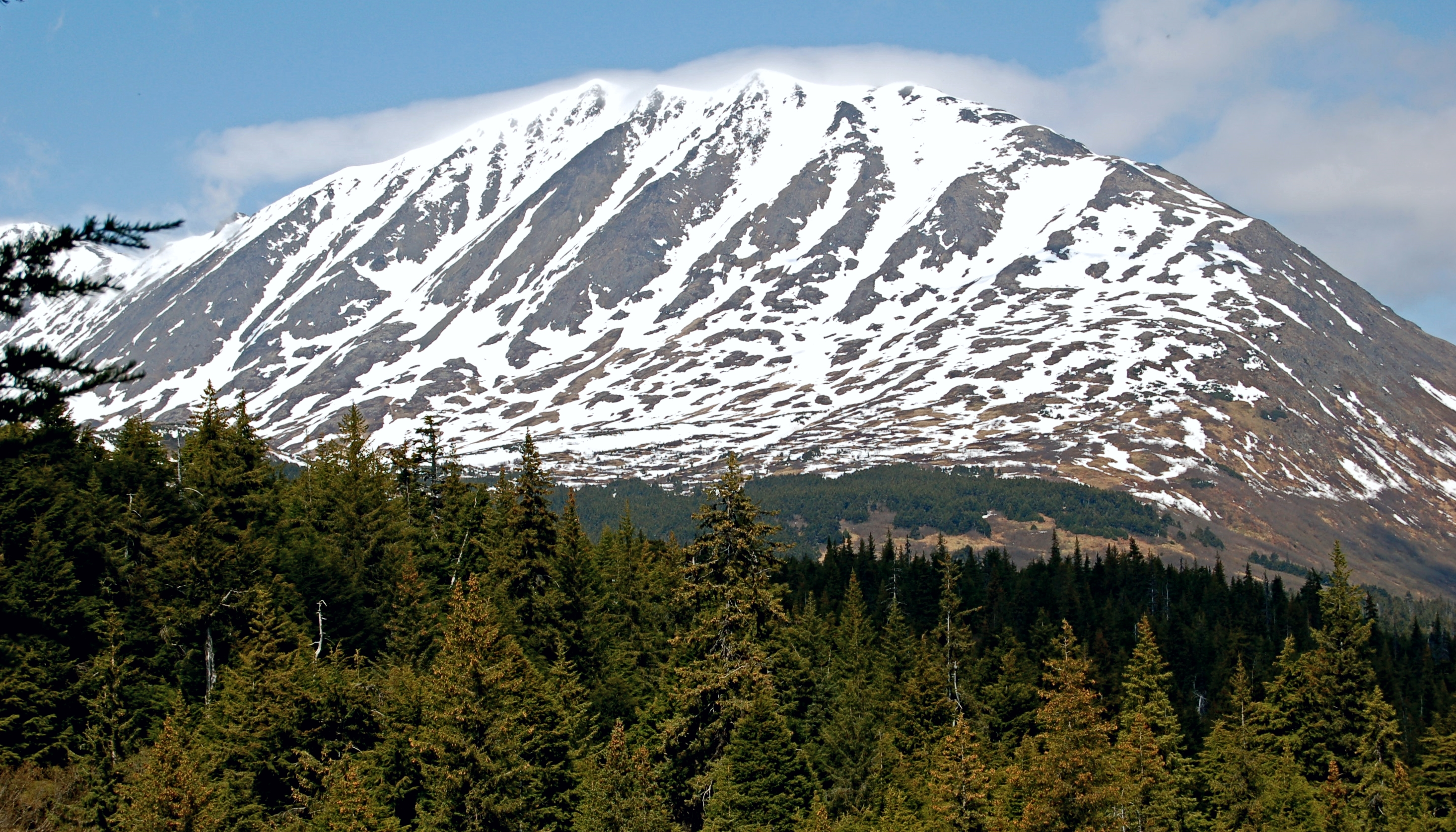
- Southeast aspect from Primrose Trail

Highest point
- Elevation: 5,178 ft (1,578 m)
- Prominence: 2,778 ft (847 m)
- Isolation: 4.1 mi (6.6 km)
- Coordinates: 60°21′22″N 149°27′58″W

Geography
- Location within Alaska
- Interactive map of Mount Adair
- Location: Chugach National Forest; Kenai Peninsula Borough; Alaska, United States
- Parent range: Kenai Mountains
- Topo map: USGS Seward B-7

Mount Adair is a prominent 5,178-foot (1,578 m) double summit mountain located in the Kenai Mountains, on the Kenai Peninsula, in the U.S. state of Alaska. The east summit is higher than the 4,940-foot west peak. The mountain is situated in Chugach National Forest, 6.8 mi (11 km) north of Mount Ascension, 7.2 mi (12 km) west of Andy Simons Mountain, and 17 mi (27 km) north of Seward, Alaska. Precipitation runoff from the mountain drains into Kenai Lake. Mount Adair's local name was reported in 1951 by the U.S. Geological Survey.

== Climate ==
Based on the Köppen climate classification, Mount Adair is located in a subarctic climate zone with long, cold, snowy winters, and mild summers. Temperatures can drop below −20 °C with wind chill factors below −30 °C. This climate supports a spruce and hemlock forest on the lower slopes.

== Gallery ==
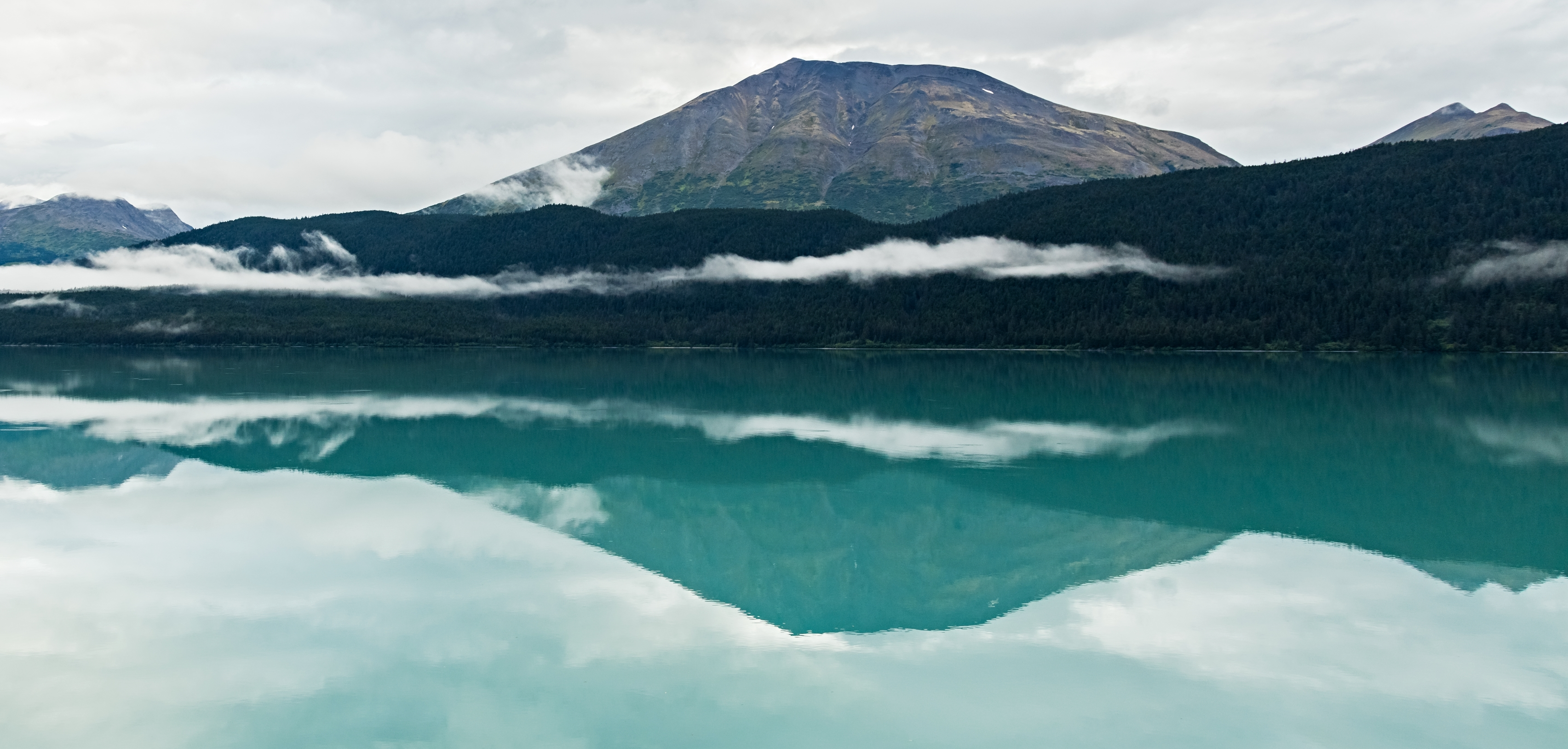
East aspect of Mount Adair reflected in Kenai Lake

== See also ==
- List of mountain peaks of Alaska
- Geology of Alaska
- Mount Madson
