= Resurrection Peaks =

Mountain ridge in Alaska, United States

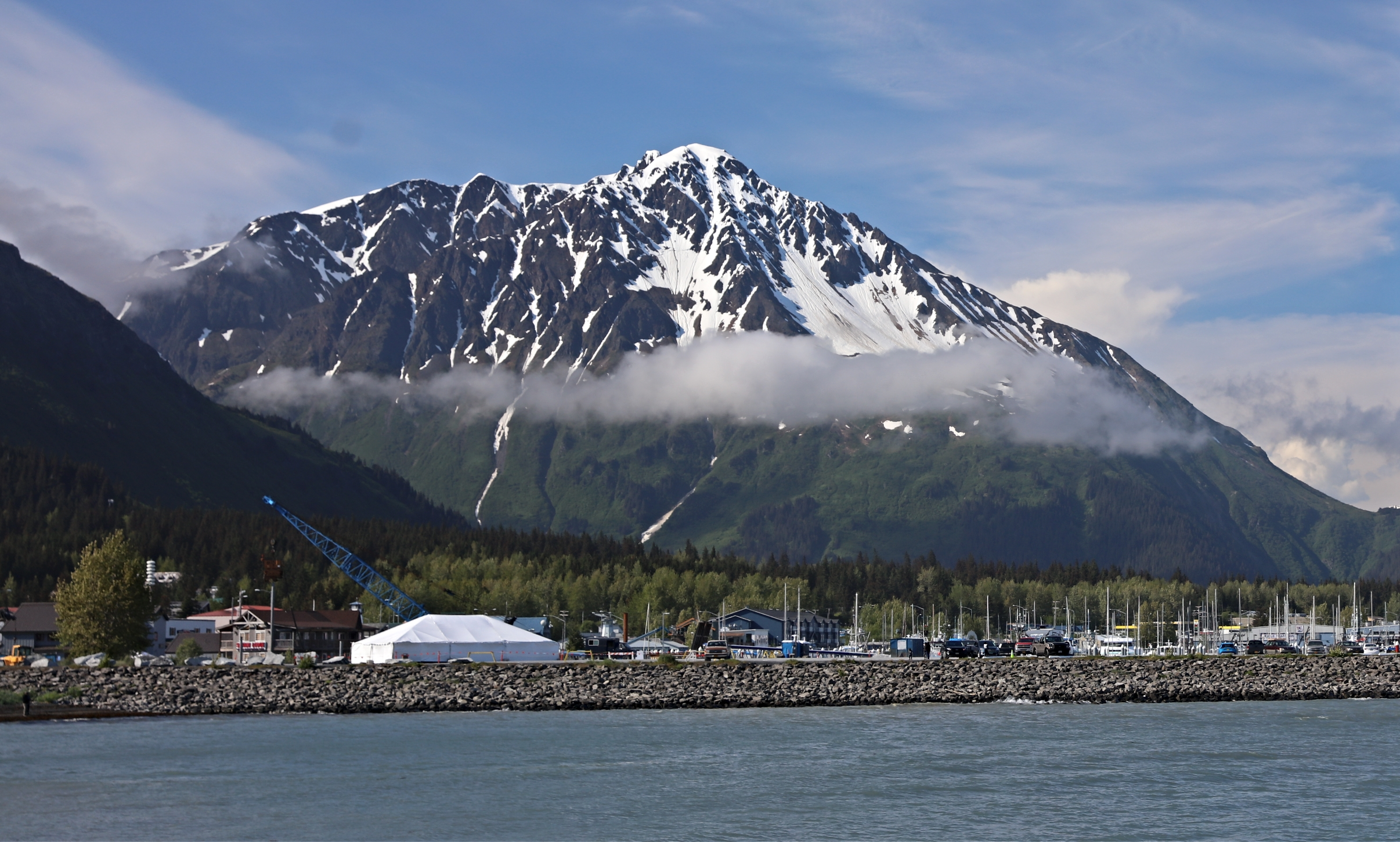
- Resurrection Peaks, south aspect

Highest point
- Elevation: 4,727 ft (1,441 m)
- Prominence: 2,300 ft (700 m)
- Parent peak: Mount Ascension
- Coordinates: 60°12′35″N 149°28′28″W

Geography
- Location within Alaska
- Interactive map of Resurrection Peaks
- Location: Chugach National Forest; Kenai Peninsula Borough; Alaska, United States
- Parent range: Kenai Mountains
- Topo map: USGS Seward A-7

Resurrection Peaks is a 4,727-foot (1,441 m) mountain ridge located in the Kenai Mountains, on the Kenai Peninsula, in the U.S. state of Alaska. The peaks are situated in Chugach National Forest, 3.3 mi (5 km) north of Mount Benson, 3.5 mi (6 km) south of Mount Ascension, and 5 mi (8 km) north of Seward, Alaska. These peaks, marked 4712' and 4665' on the USGS map, together with their ridges and glacier form a distinct group. The peaks overlook the mouth of Resurrection River into Resurrection Bay, and take their name from the bay named since 1792, and the river since 1898. Resurrection Peaks' name was officially adopted in 1969 by the United States Geological Survey.

== Climate ==
Based on the Köppen climate classification, Resurrection Peaks are located in a subarctic climate zone with long, cold, snowy winters, and mild summers. Temperatures can drop below −20 °C with wind chill factors below −30 °C. This climate supports a spruce and hemlock forest on the lower slopes. The months May and June offer the most favorable weather for viewing.

== Gallery ==
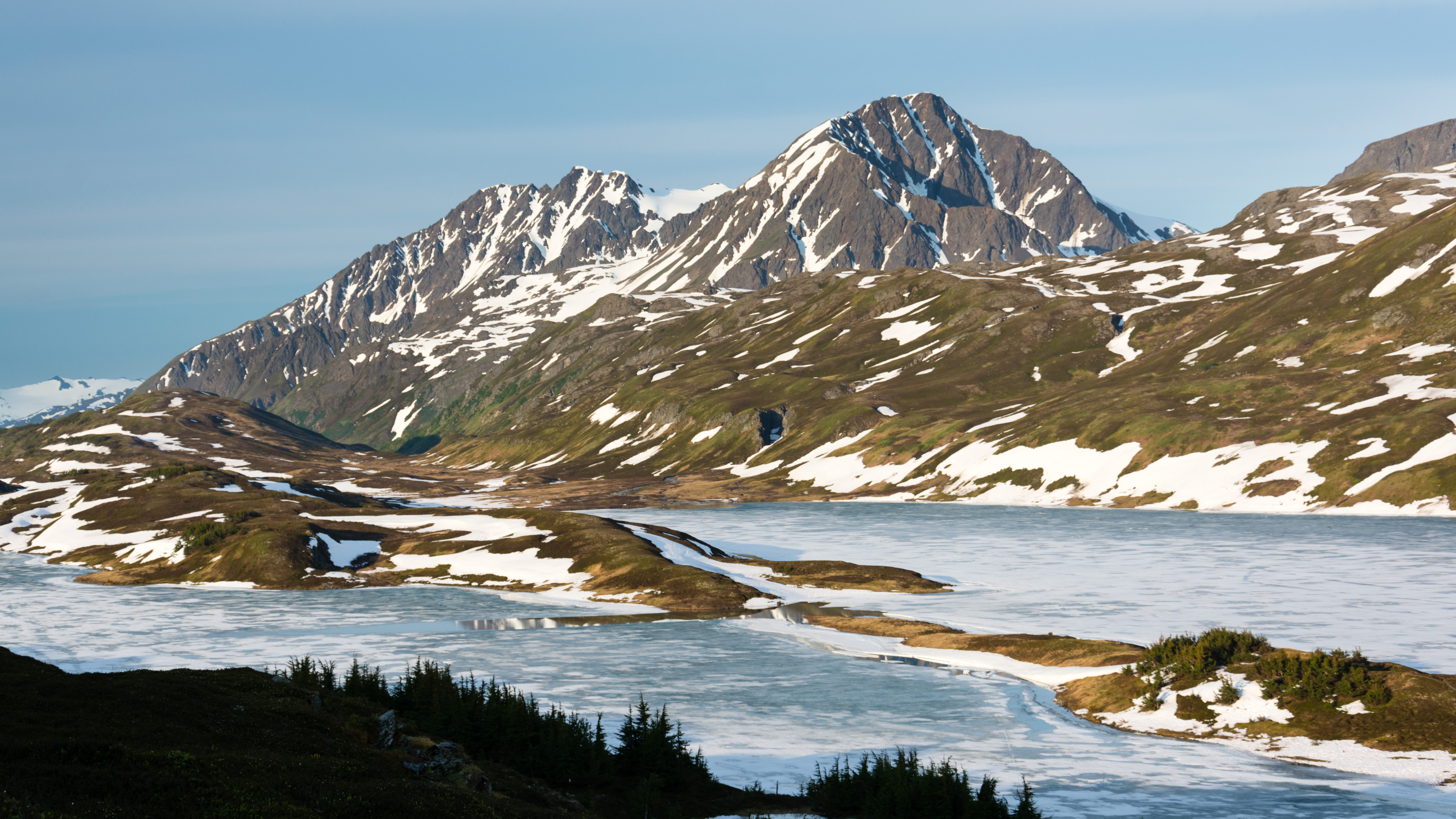
From northeast at Lost Lake

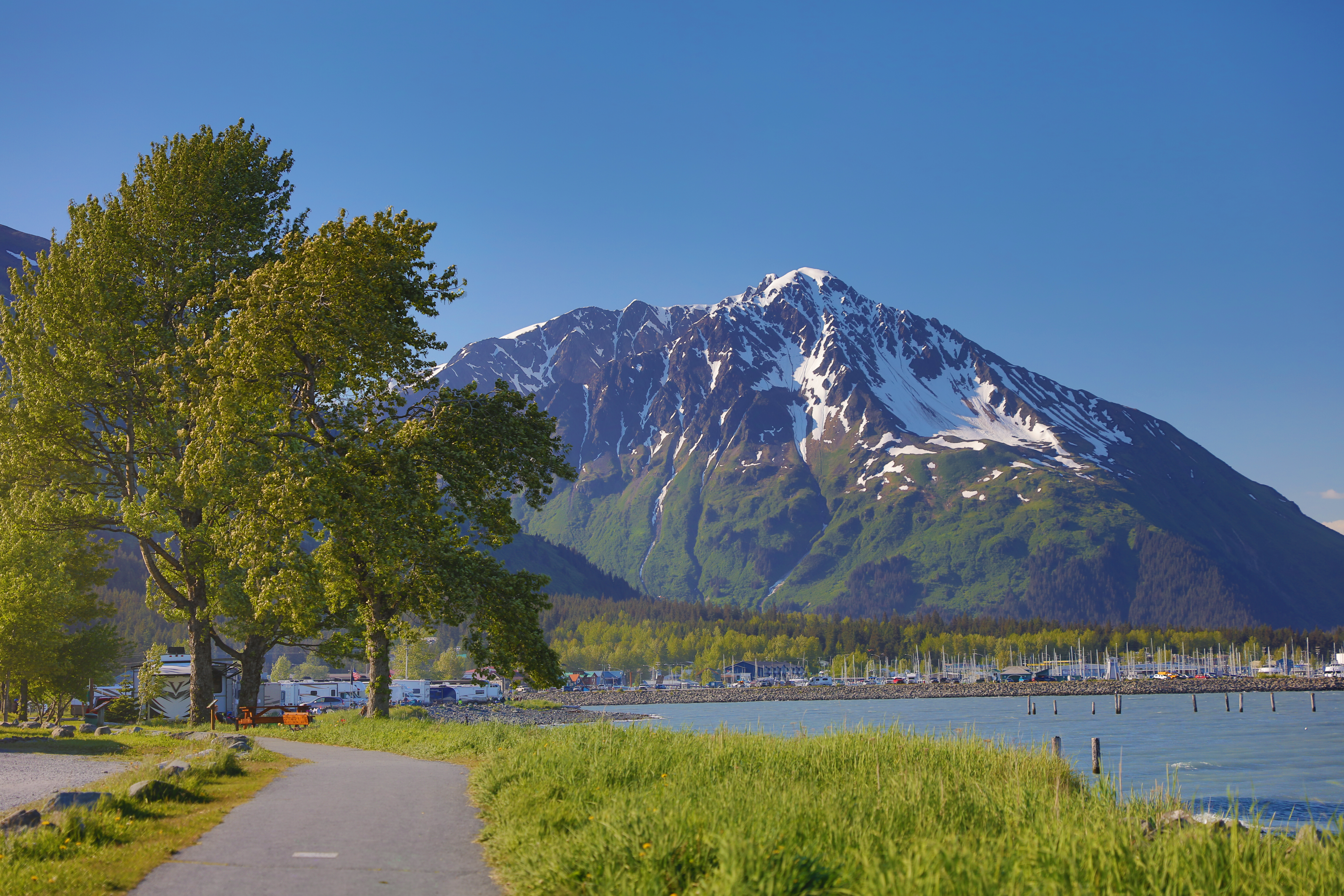
Viewed from Seward

== See also ==
- List of mountain peaks of Alaska
- Geology of Alaska
