= Mount Benson (Alaska) =

Mountain in Alaska, United States

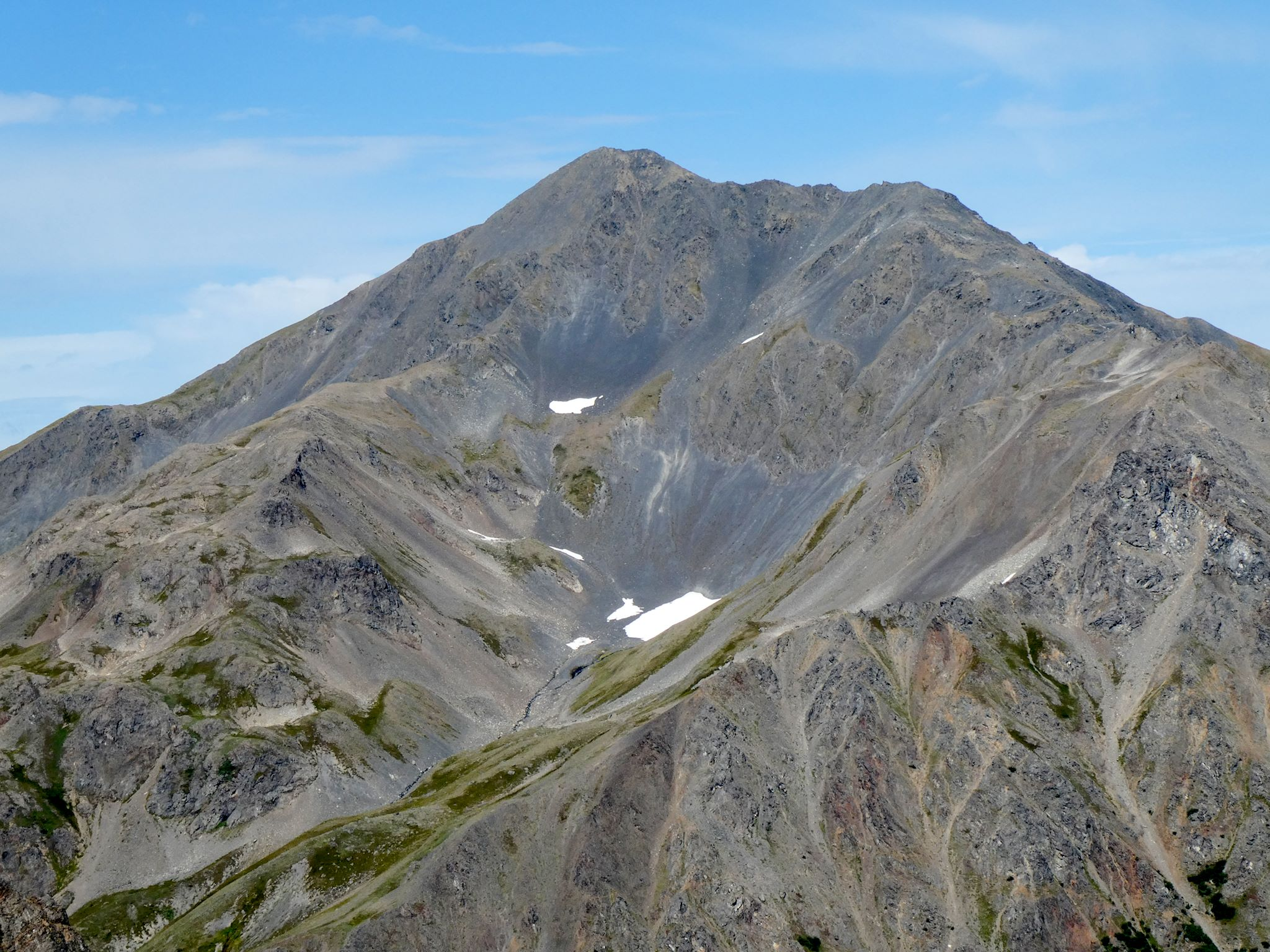
- Mount Benson, south aspect

Highest point
- Elevation: 4,465 ft (1,361 m)
- Prominence: 1,643 ft (501 m)
- Parent peak: Phoenix Peak
- Coordinates: 60°08′37″N 149°29′39″W

Geography
- Location within Alaska
- Interactive map of Mount Benson
- Location: Chugach National Forest; Kenai Peninsula Borough; Alaska, United States
- Parent range: Kenai Mountains
- Topo map: USGS Seward A-7

Mount Benson is a 4,465-foot (1,361 m) mountain summit located in the Kenai Mountains, on the Kenai Peninsula, in the U.S. state of Alaska. The peak is situated in Chugach National Forest, rising above the Resurrection River and Resurrection Bay, 3.3 mi (5 km) south of Resurrection Peaks, 2.35 mi (4 km) north of Marathon Mountain, and 3.1 mi (5 km) northwest of Seward, Alaska. Originally named Iron Mountain, the mountain's name was officially changed in 1974 by the United States Geological Survey to honor Benny Benson (1913-1972), who at age 13 designed Alaska's flag in 1927, as a student in Seward.

== Climate ==
Based on the Köppen climate classification, Mount Benson is located in a subarctic climate zone with long, cold, snowy winters, and mild summers. Temperatures can drop below −20 °C with wind chill factors below −30 °C. This climate supports a spruce and hemlock forest on the lower slopes. The months May and June offer the most favorable weather for viewing.

== Gallery ==
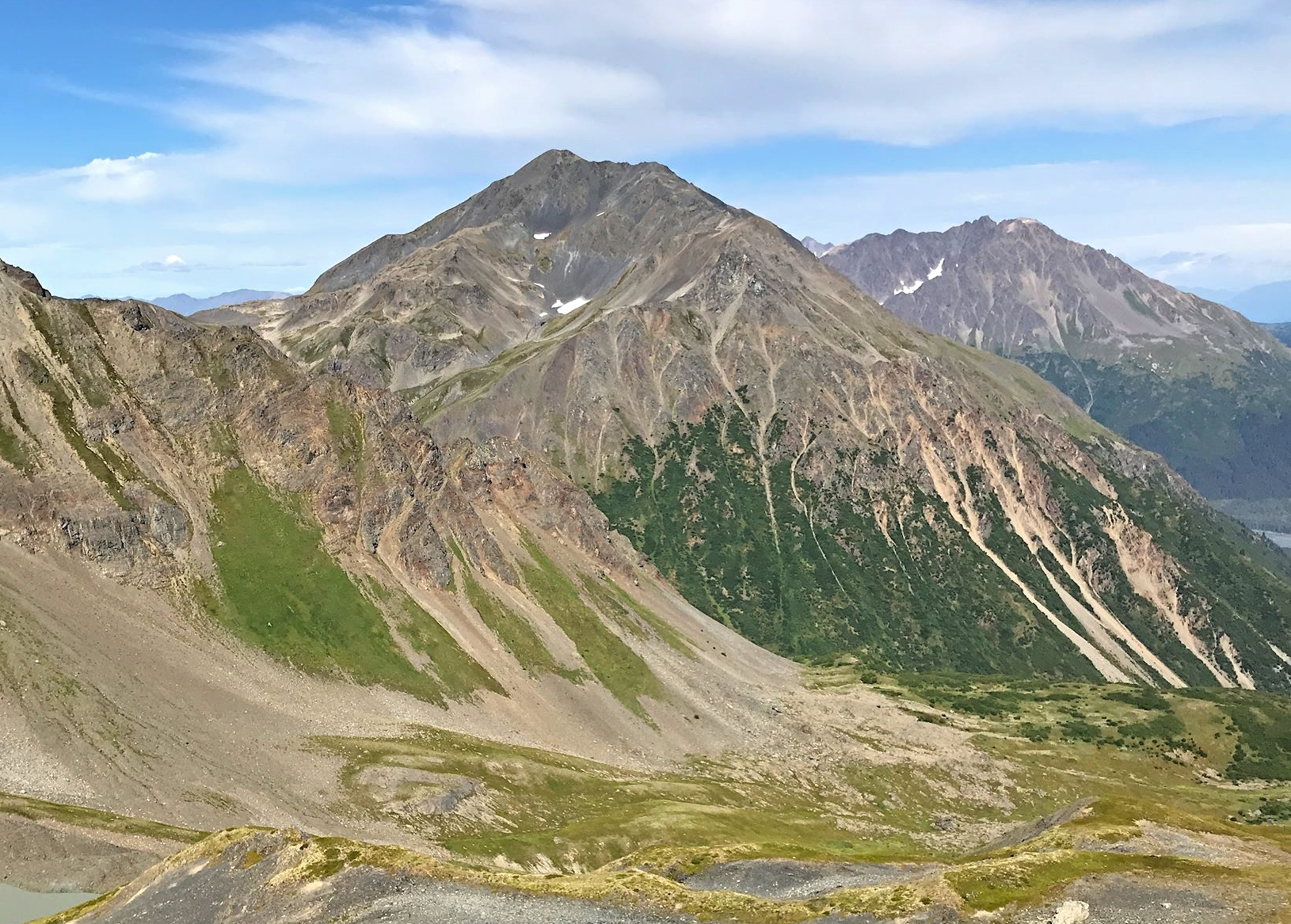
Mount Benson from Marathon Mountain
(Resurrection Peaks distant right)

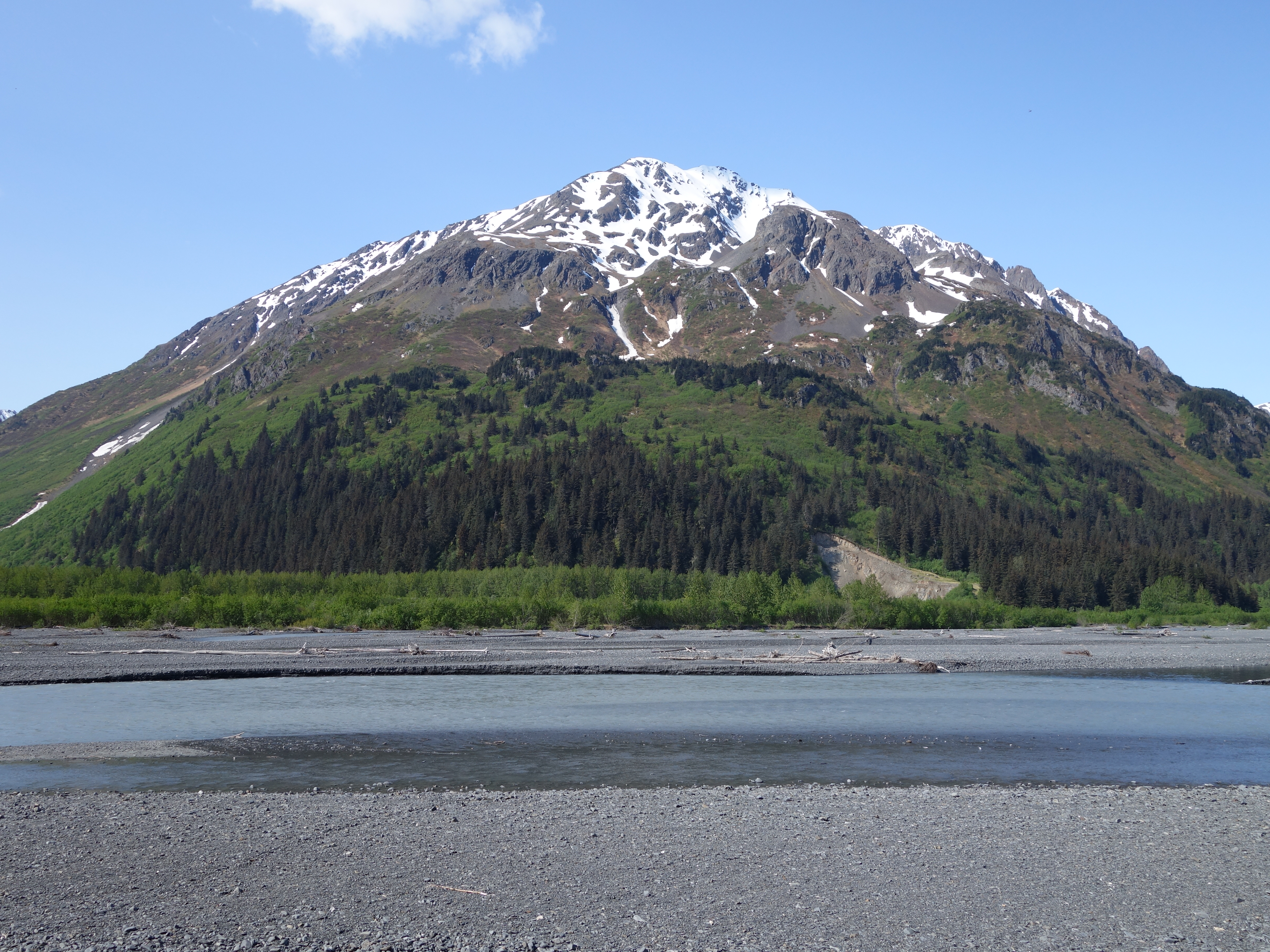
Northeast aspect with Resurrection River

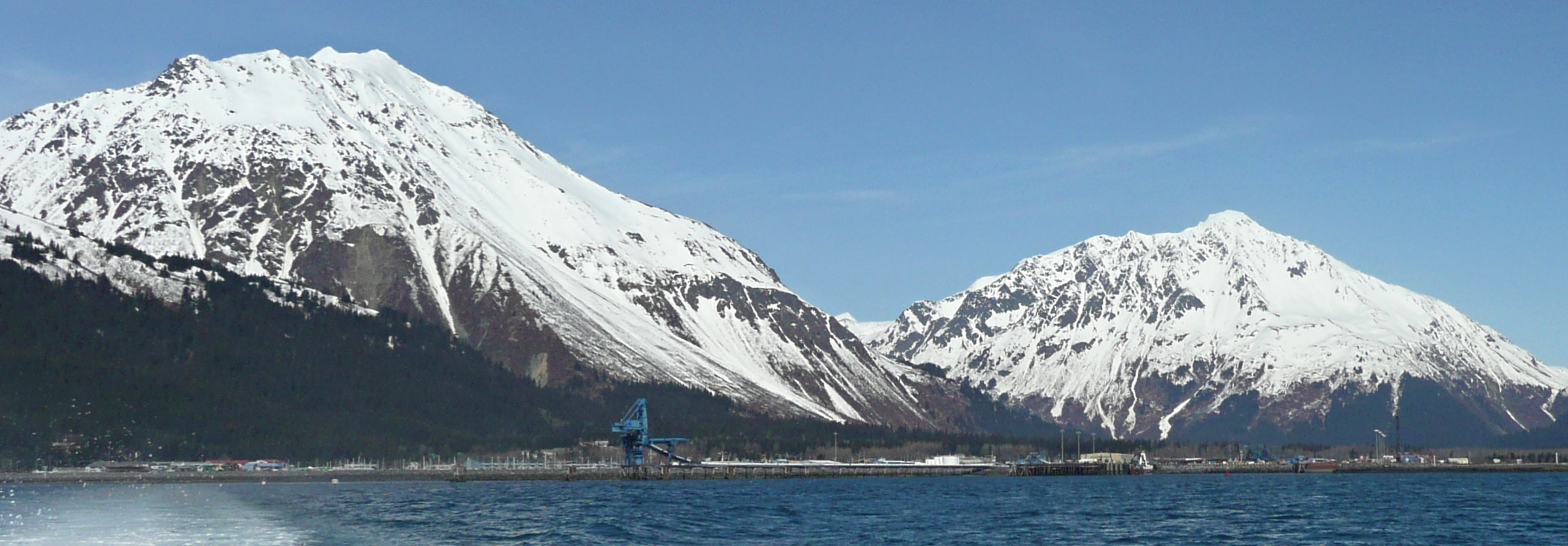
Mt. Benson (left), Resurrection Peaks (right)

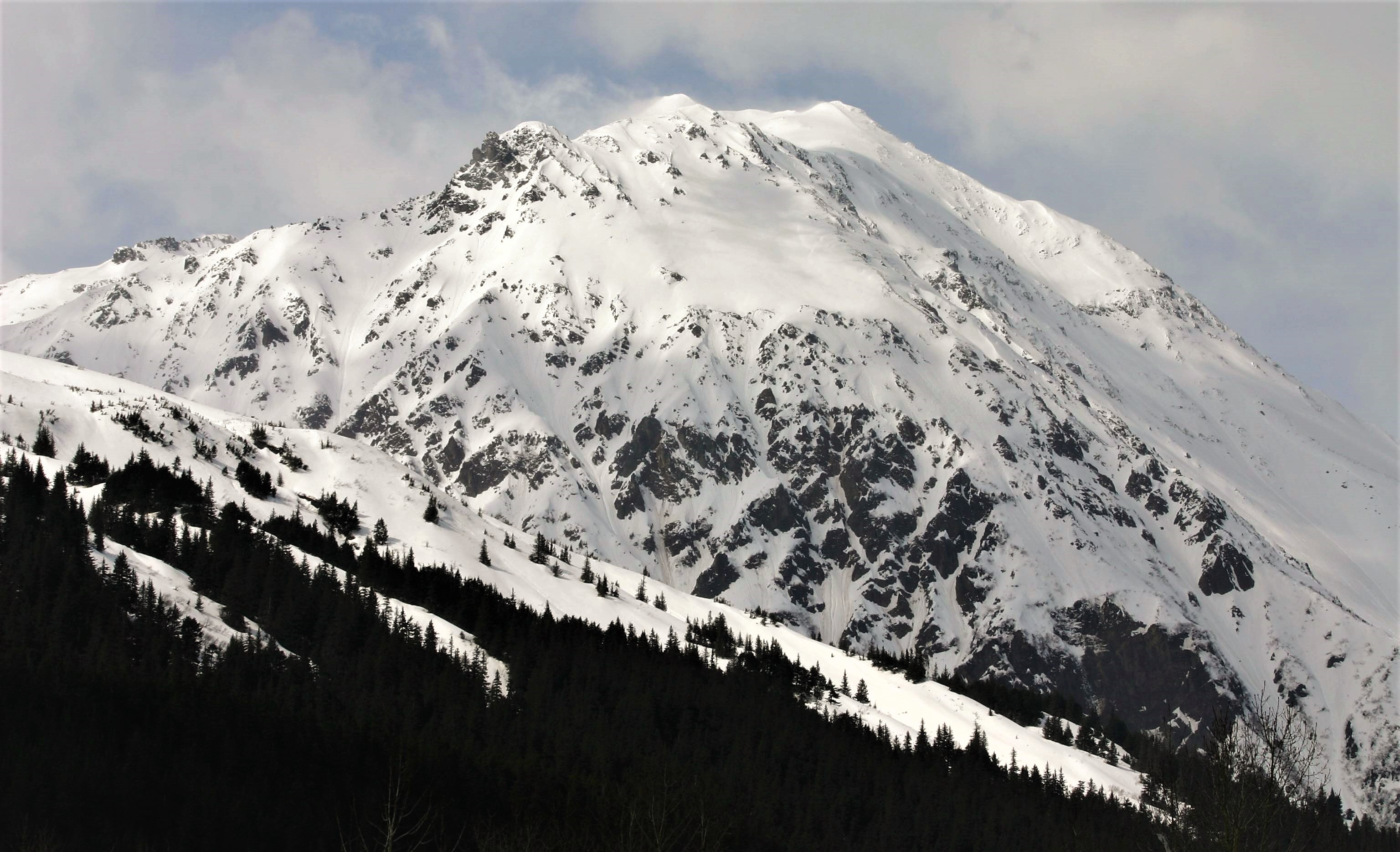

== See also ==
- List of mountain peaks of Alaska
- Geology of Alaska
