= Mount Ascension =

Mountain in the state of Alaska

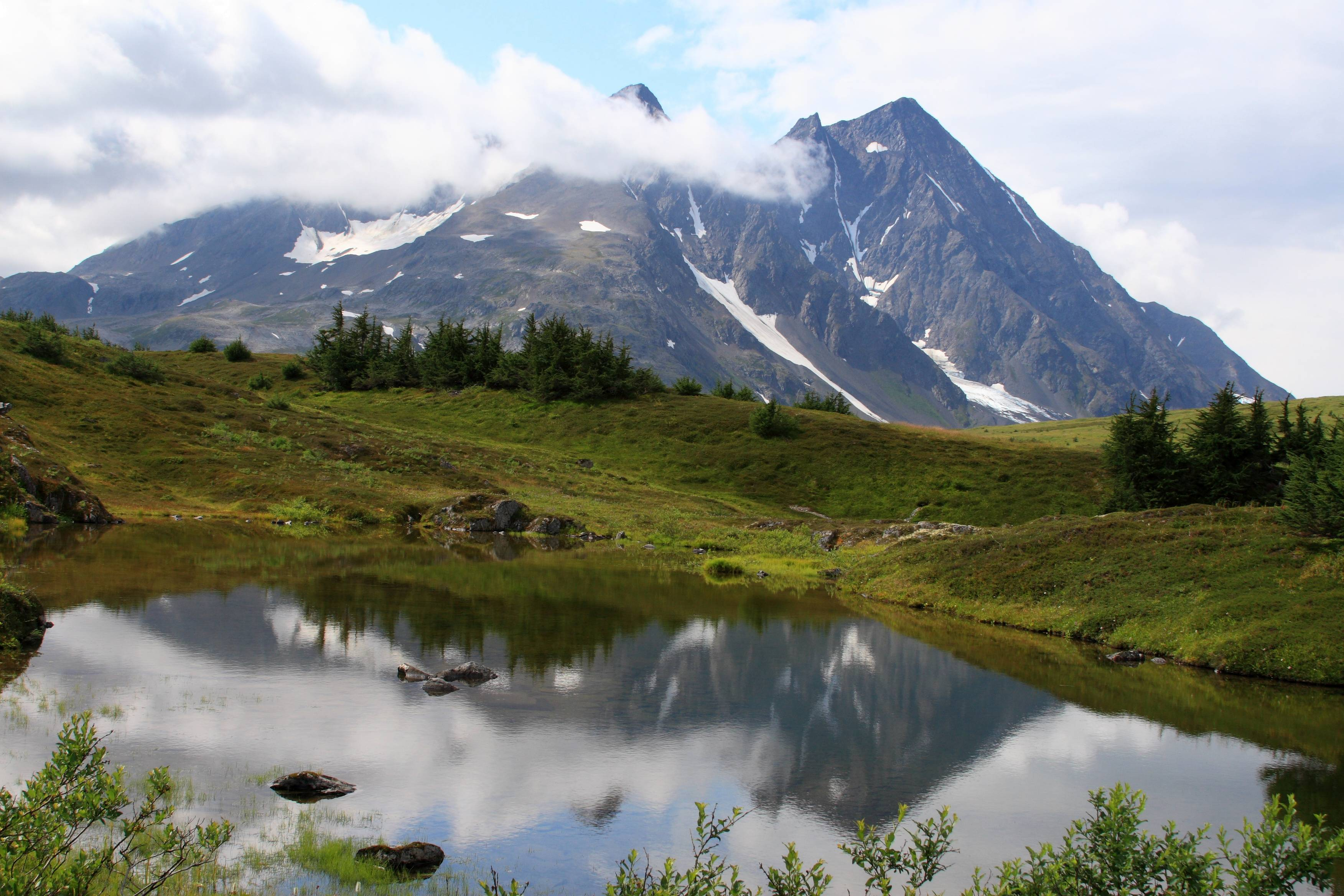
- Northeast aspect, summit on right

Highest point
- Elevation: 5,710 ft (1,740 m)
- Prominence: 4,810 ft (1,470 m)
- Isolation: 9.07 mi (14.60 km)
- Coordinates: 60°15′33″N 149°29′45″W

Geography
- Location within Alaska
- Interactive map of Mount Ascension
- Location: Chugach National Forest; Kenai Peninsula Borough; Alaska, United States
- Parent range: Kenai Mountains
- Topo map: USGS Seward B-7

Climbing
- First ascent: 1968
- Easiest route: Mountaineering

Mount Ascension is a prominent 5,710-foot (1,740 m) mountain summit located in the Kenai Mountains, on the Kenai Peninsula, in the U.S. state of Alaska. The mountain is situated in Chugach National Forest, 6.8 mi (11 km) south of Mount Adair, 3.5 mi (6 km) north of Resurrection Peaks, and 10 mi (16 km) north of Seward, Alaska. The peak is near the mouth of Resurrection River into Resurrection Bay, whose names refer to the Resurrection of Jesus. Similarly, Mount Ascension gets its name from the Ascension of Jesus. This name was proposed in 1968 by the Mountaineering Club of Alaska, and officially adopted in 1969 by the United States Geological Survey. Access to the peak is via the Lost Lake Trail, and mountaineering skills are needed to reach the summit. In clear weather the immense Harding Icefield can be seen from the top. The first ascent of this peak was made October 6, 1968, by John Vincent Hoeman and his wife, Dr. Grace (Jansen) Hoeman.

== Climate ==
Based on the Köppen climate classification, Mount Ascension is located in a subarctic climate zone with long, cold, snowy winters, and mild summers. Temperatures can drop below −20 °C with wind chill factors below −30 °C. This climate supports a spruce and hemlock forest on the lower slopes.

== Gallery ==
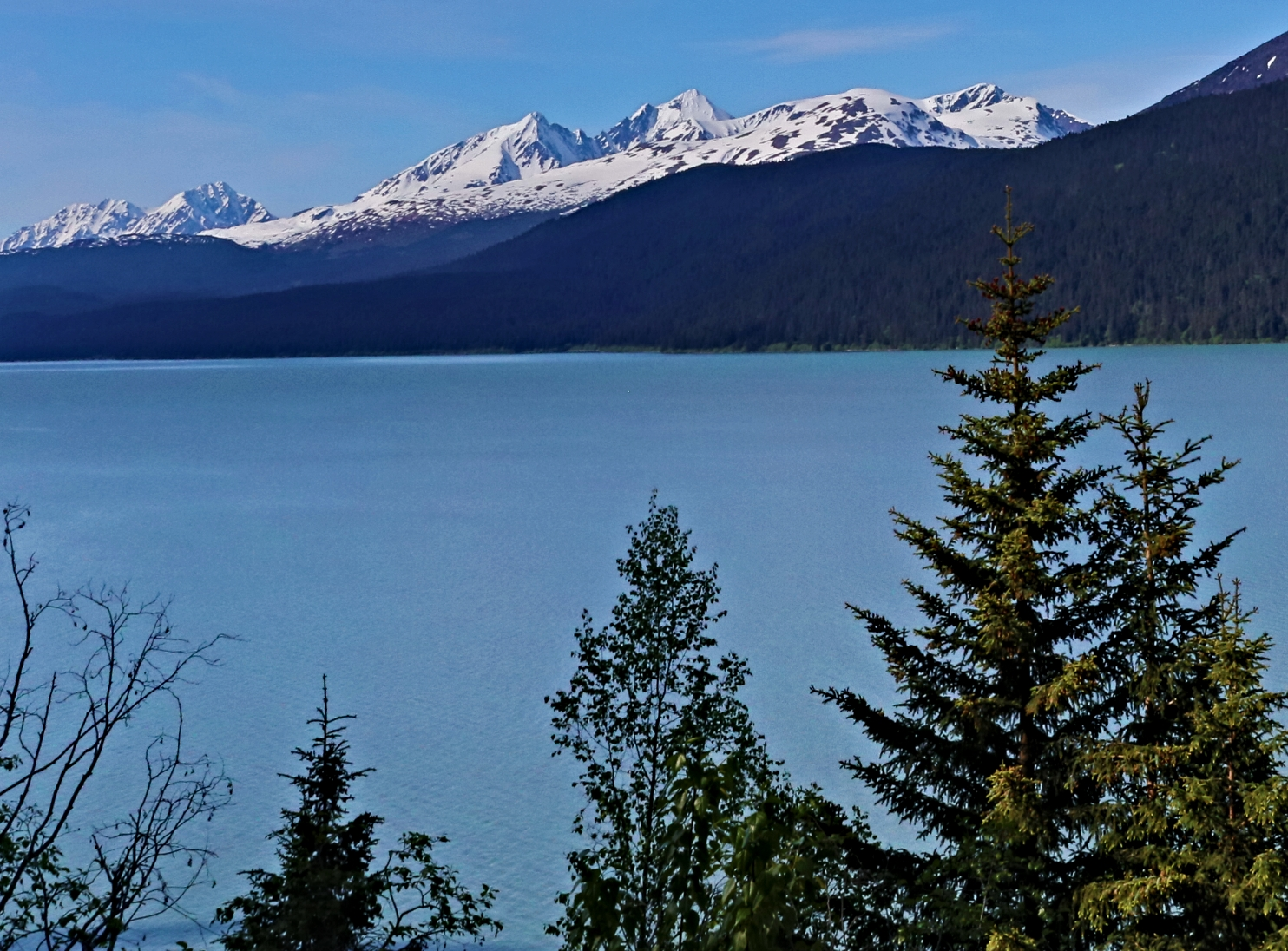
Mount Ascension from Kenai Lake

== See also ==
- List of mountain peaks of Alaska
- Geology of Alaska
