= Andy Simons Mountain =

Double summit mountain in Alaska, United States

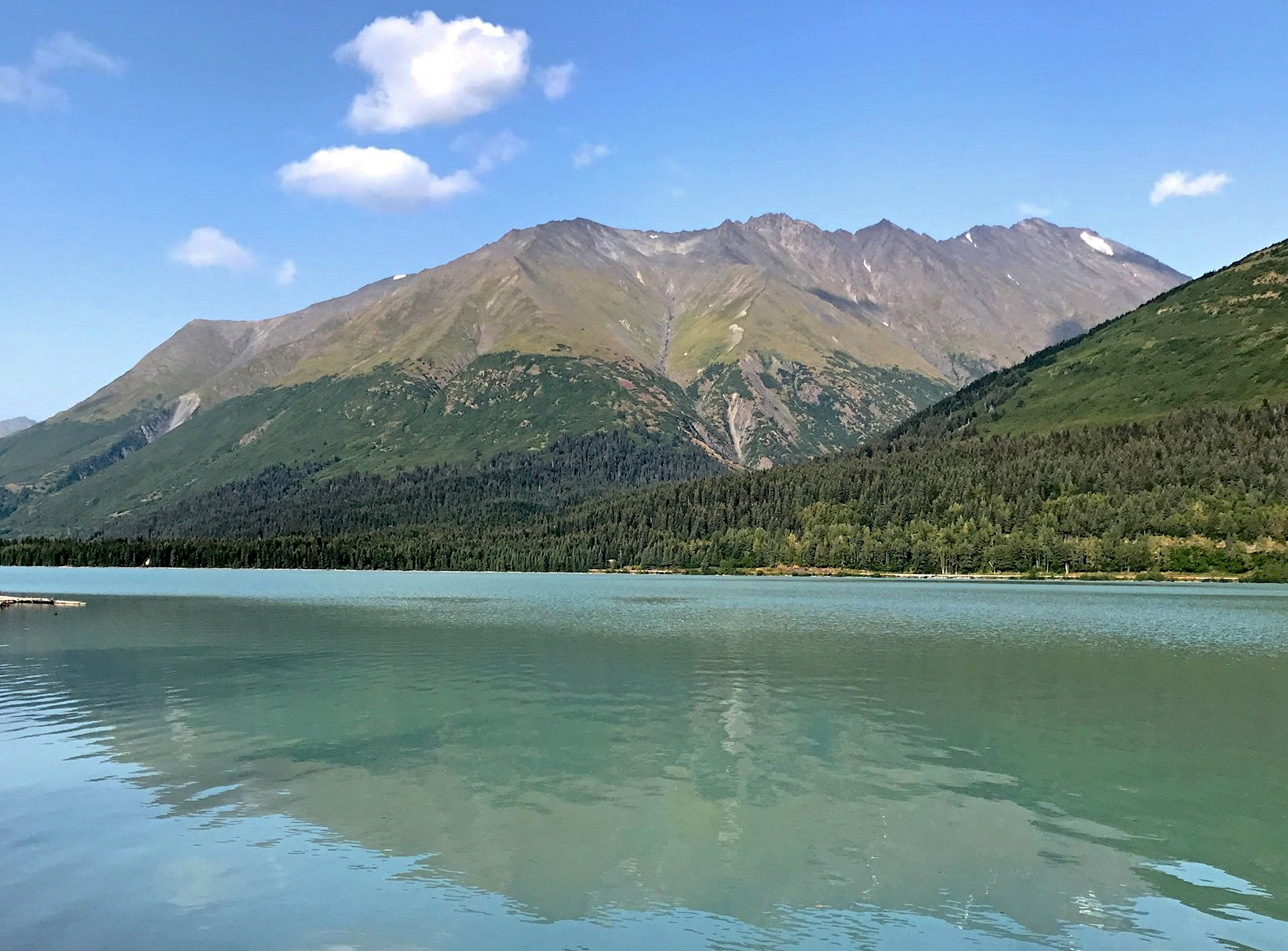
- Southwest aspect, summit to right

Highest point
- Elevation: 6,407 ft (1,953 m)
- Prominence: 4,507 ft (1,374 m)
- Parent peak: Isthmus Peak
- Isolation: 19 mi (31 km)
- Coordinates: 60°22′17″N 149°15′37″W

Geography
- Location within Alaska
- Interactive map of Andy Simons Mountain
- Country: United States
- State: Alaska
- Borough: Kenai Peninsula
- Protected area: Chugach National Forest
- Parent range: Kenai Mountains
- Topo map: USGS Seward B-7

Climbing
- First ascent: 1963
- Easiest route: Exposed Scrambling

Andy Simons Mountain is a prominent 6,407-foot (1,953 m) double summit mountain located in the Kenai Mountains, and the fourth-highest peak on the Kenai Peninsula in the state of Alaska. The true summit is 1.3 mile west of the 5,300+ foot subsidiary east peak on this five-mile-long northwest-to-southeast trending mountain. The mountain is situated in Chugach National Forest, 7.2 mi (12 km) east of Mount Adair, and 17 mi (27 km) north of Seward, Alaska. The Seward Highway and Alaska Railroad traverse its western foot. Precipitation runoff from the mountain drains into Kenai Lake.

== History ==
The first ascent of this mountain was made on May 18, 1963, by a Mountaineerng Club of Alaska party led by Dave Johnston. This group left a summit register with the name "Big Bad Wolf Peak" as the intended name, in keeping with the theme of the already named Mother Goose Glacier at the south end of this mountain. However, that same year the Seward Chamber of Commerce submitted a request that the mountain be named after Andrew Adrian Simons (1882–1962), an early settler and big-game hunting guide who in his 27 years as a member of the Alaska Game Commission worked to help conserve and publicize the game resources of Alaska. The mountain is in view of Andy Simons' Lakeview homestead which he lived on for more than 30 years. Andy would look at the mountain each morning to see if there were goats or mountain sheep on the slopes. Andrew Simons was born in Närpes, Finland, on August 10, 1882, and arrived in the Alaska area in the early 1900s as a prospector, then Seward around 1908. He was licensed as the first registered hunting guide in Alaska in 1910, and held license No. 1 until his death on September 18, 1962. He was considered one of the best in his profession and was well-known to all big-game hunters the world over. The story of his career was told in magazines such as The Saturday Evening Post, Collier's, Field & Stream, and Holiday. The name was officially adopted in 1963 by the United States Geological Survey.

== Climate ==
Based on the Köppen climate classification, Andy Simons Mountain is located in a subarctic climate zone with long, cold, snowy winters, and mild summers. Weather systems coming off the Gulf of Alaska are forced upwards by the Kenai Mountains (orographic lift), causing heavy precipitation in the form of rainfall and snowfall. Winter temperatures can drop below 0 °F with wind chill factors below −10 °F. This climate supports a spruce and hemlock forest on the lower slopes.

== See also ==
- List of mountain peaks of Alaska
- Geography of Alaska
