= Phoenix Peak =

Phoenix Peak may refer to:

- Phoenix Peak (Alaska)
- Phoenix Peak (Antarctica)
- Phoenix Peak (Colorado)
