= Carpathian Peak =

Mountain in Alaska

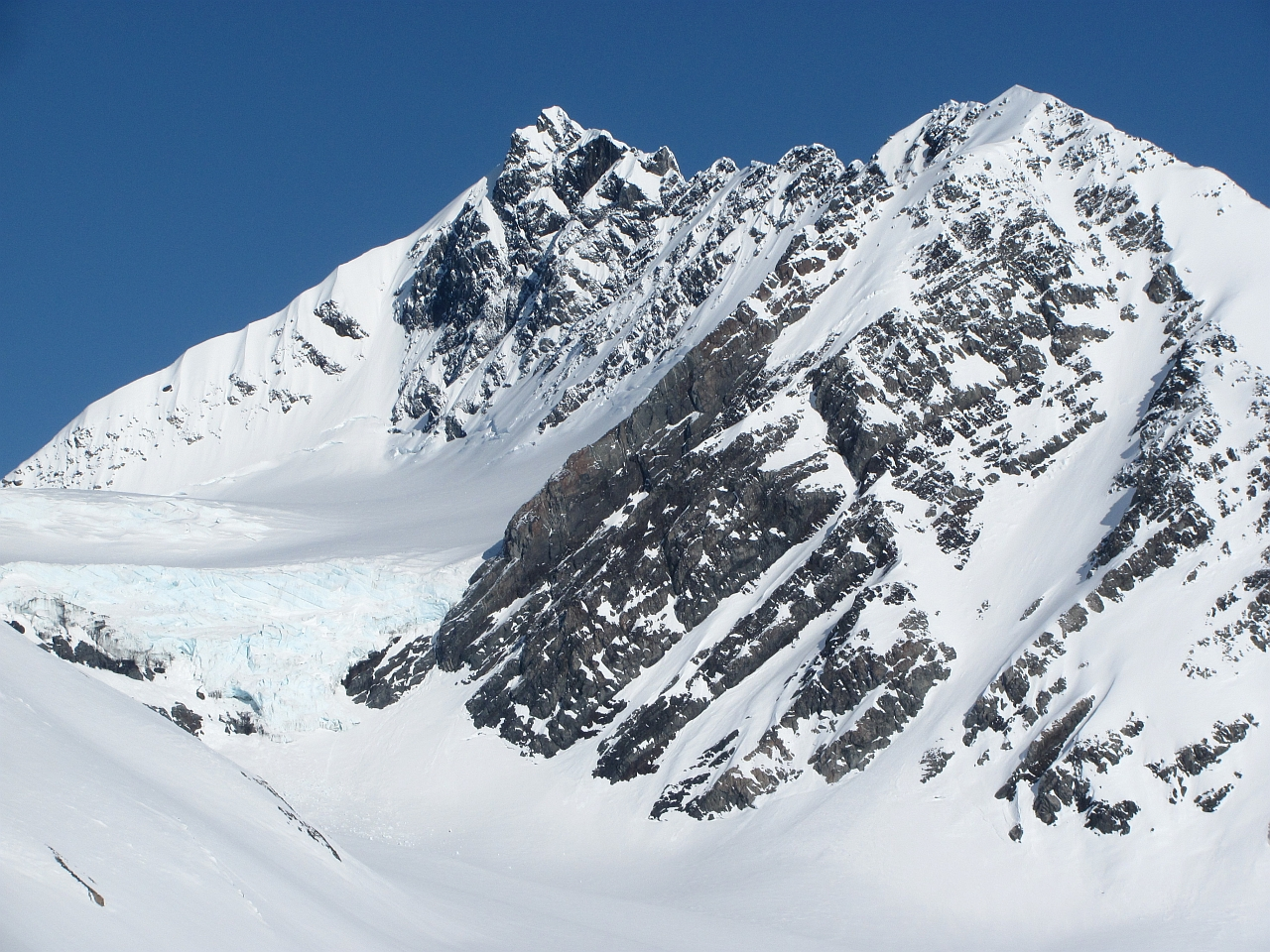
- Carpathian Peak

Highest point
- Elevation: 6,000+ ft (1,830+ m)
- Prominence: 3,000 ft (910 m)
- Parent peak: Isthmus Peak (6,532 ft)
- Isolation: 8.06 mi (12.97 km)
- Coordinates: 60°41′22″N 148°49′55″W

Geography
- Location within Alaska
- Interactive map of Carpathian Peak
- Location: Chugach National Forest; Kenai Peninsula Borough; Alaska, United States
- Parent range: Kenai Mountains
- Topo map: USGS Seward C-5

Climbing
- First ascent: May 1959 by Keith Hart, Ted Barrett, and Mat Nitsch

Carpathian Peak is a prominent 6,000+ ft (1,830+ m) mountain summit located in the Kenai Mountains, in the U.S. state of Alaska. The peak is situated in Chugach National Forest, 8 mi (13 km) southwest of Whittier, Alaska, at the isthmus of the Kenai Peninsula, where the Kenai Mountains meet the Chugach Mountains. Although modest in elevation, relief is significant since the eastern aspect of the mountain rises from sea level at Blackstone Bay in Prince William Sound. The peak's nearest higher peak is Isthmus Peak, 8 mi (13 km) to the south, and nearby Bard Peak lies 5 mi (8.0 km) northeast. The mountain's name was officially adopted in 1959 by the United States Geological Survey. The 1959 first ascent party of Keith Hart, Ted Barrett, and Mat Nitsch suggested the name as a tribute to the Carpathian Mountains in Nitsch's homeland which at the time was behind the Iron Curtain, with the intention to create a symbol of freedom.

== Climate ==
Based on the Köppen climate classification, Carpathian Peak is located in a subarctic climate zone with long, cold, snowy winters, and mild summers. Temperatures can drop below −20 °C with wind chill factors below −30 °C. This climate supports the Skookum Glacier on the west side, Portage Glacier to the north, and the Spencer Glacier on its south and east aspects. The months May through July offer the most favorable weather for viewing or climbing this peak.

== Gallery ==
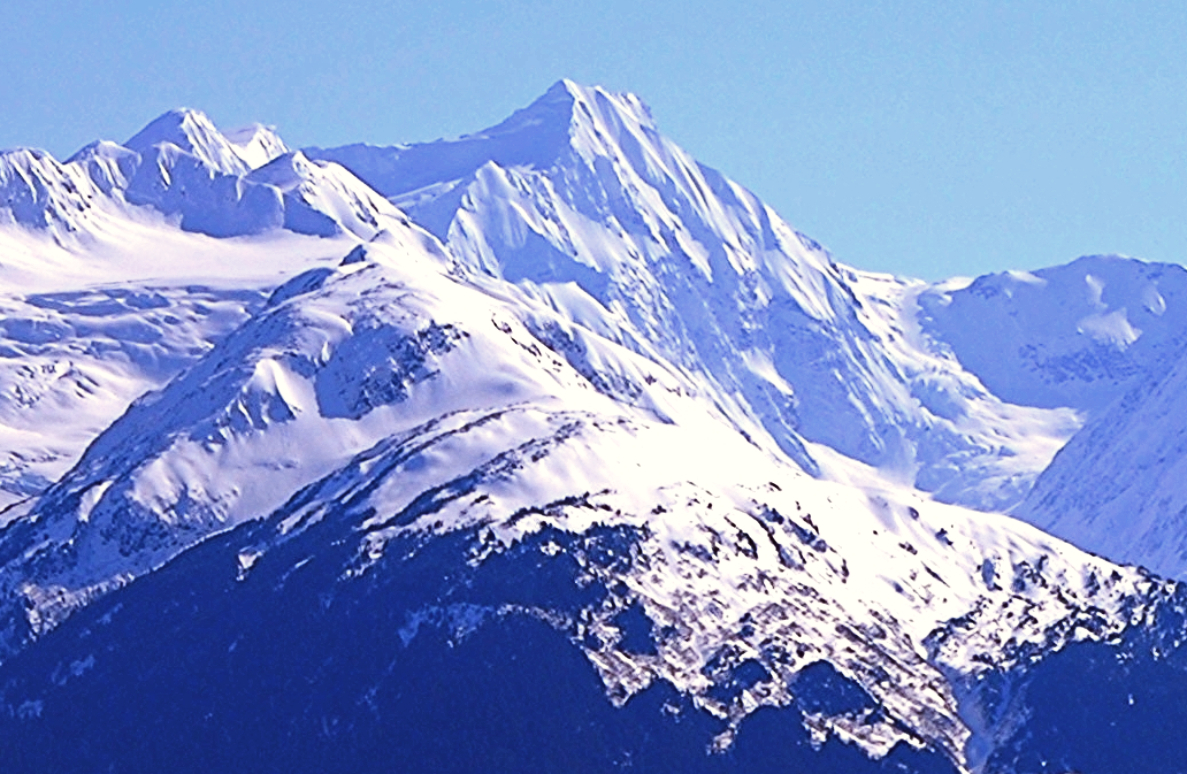
Carpathian Peak

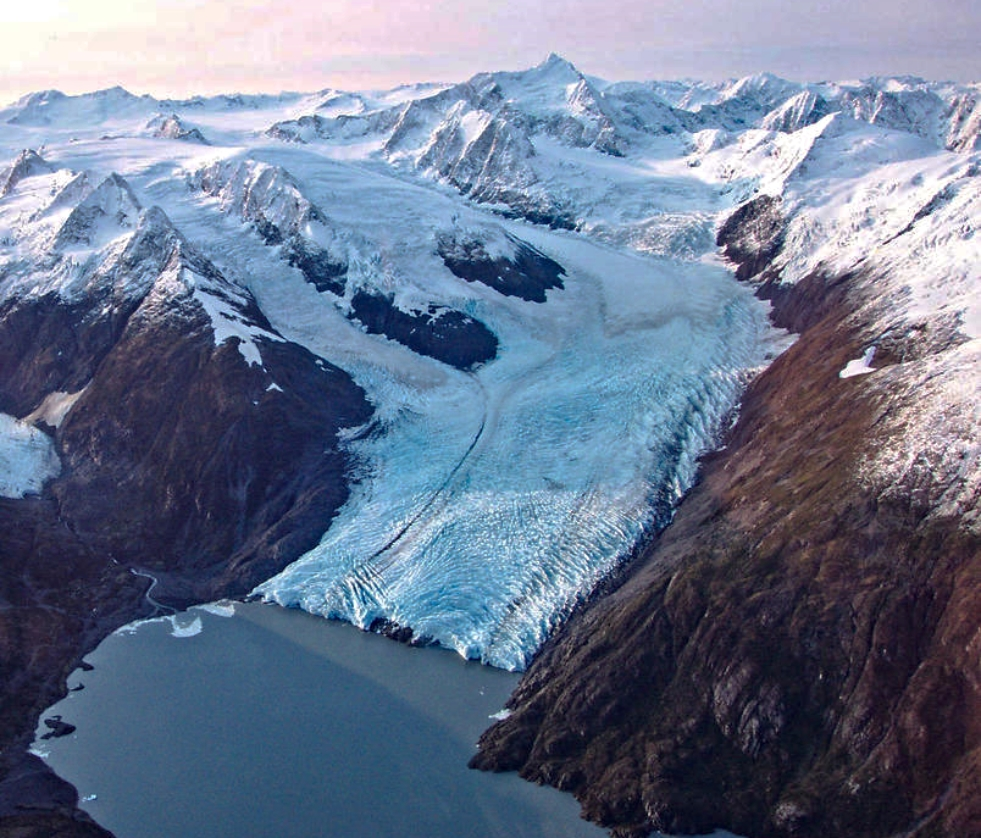
Carpathian Peak centered beyond Portage Glacier

== See also ==
- List of mountain peaks of Alaska
- Geography of Alaska
