= Mount Marathon =

Mountain in Alaska, United States

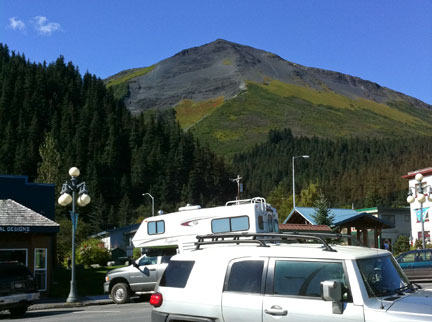
- View of Mount Marathon from Downtown Seward

Highest point
- Elevation: 4,826 ft (1,471 m)
- Prominence: 889 ft (271 m)
- Parent peak: Phoenix Peak
- Coordinates: 60°06′55″N 149°30′15″W

Geography
- Location within Alaska
- Location: Kenai Peninsula, Alaska
- Parent range: Kenai Mountains
- Topo map: USGS Seward A-7

Climbing
- First ascent: Unknown
- Easiest route: Scramble

Mount Marathon, or officially Marathon Mountain, is a 4,826-foot (1,471 m) mountain summit directly west of Seward in the Kenai Mountains in the U.S. state of Alaska. The peak is situated in Chugach National Forest, rising above Resurrection Bay, 2.35 mi (4 km) south of Mount Benson, and 2 mi (3 km) north of Bear Mountain. The namesake of the mountain is the Mount Marathon Race held every Fourth of July.

== Climate ==
Based on the Köppen climate classification, Mount Marathon is located in a subarctic climate zone with long, cold, snowy winters, and mild summers.Temperatures can drop below −20 °C with wind chill factors below −30 °C. This climate supports a spruce and hemlock forest on the lower slopes. The months May and June offer the most favorable weather for viewing.

== See also ==
- List of mountain peaks of Alaska
- Geology of Alaska
