= Phoenix Peak (Alaska) =

Mountain in the state of Alaska

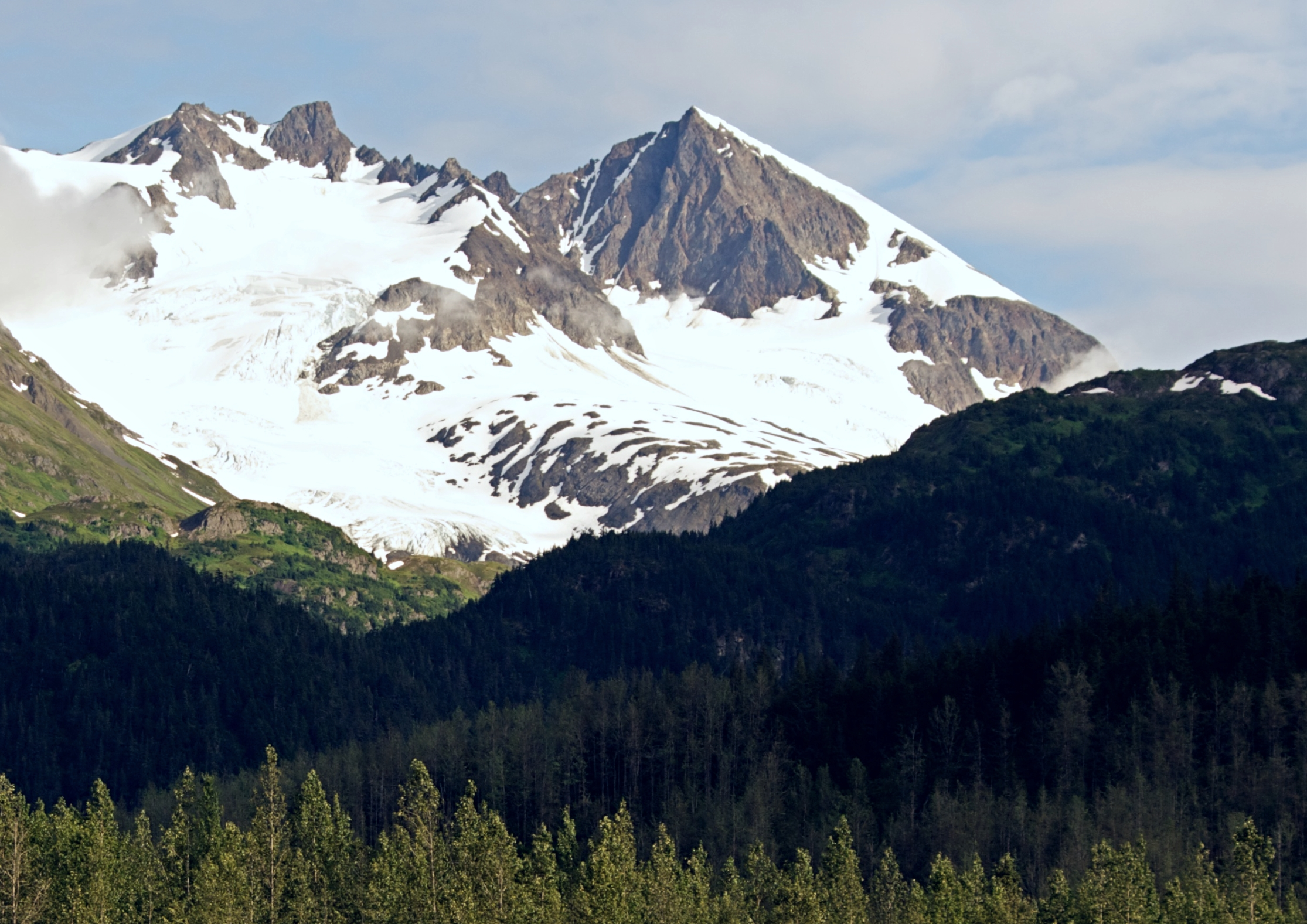
- NW aspect from Resurrection River valley

Highest point
- Elevation: 5,187 ft (1,581 m)
- Prominence: 3,350 ft (1,021 m)
- Parent peak: Mount Alice
- Isolation: 5.67 mi (9.12 km)
- Coordinates: 60°07′20″N 149°32′19″W

Geography
- Location within Alaska
- Interactive map of Phoenix Peak
- Country: United States
- State: Alaska
- Borough: Kenai Peninsula
- Protected area: Kenai Fjords National Park
- Parent range: Kenai Mountains
- Topo map: USGS Seward A-7

Climbing
- First ascent: 1964 by Don Stockard

Phoenix Peak is a 5,187-foot (1,581 m) mountain summit located in the Kenai Mountains, on the Kenai Peninsula, in the U.S. state of Alaska. The peak is situated in Kenai Fjords National Park, 2 mi (3 km) southwest of Mount Benson, 1.1 mi (2 km) northwest of Marathon Mountain, and 3.5 mi (6 km) west of Seward, Alaska. Precipitation runoff from the mountain and meltwater from its glaciers drains into tributaries of the Resurrection River. The first ascent of the peak was made July 23, 1964, by Don Stockard of the Mountaineering Club of Alaska. The peak was named in 1965 by the Mountaineering Club of Alaska for the first ship ever built in Russian America, the Phoenix, which was constructed in 1794 by Russians in nearby Resurrection Bay. The mountain's toponym was officially adopted in 1966 by the United States Geological Survey.

== Climate ==
Based on the Köppen climate classification, Phoenix Peak is located in a subarctic climate zone with long, cold, snowy winters, and mild summers. Weather systems coming off the Gulf of Alaska are forced upwards by the Kenai Mountains (orographic lift), causing heavy precipitation in the form of rainfall and snowfall. Winter temperatures can drop below 0 °F with wind chill factors below −10 °F. The months May and June offer the most favorable weather for viewing the mountain. In fair weather, the Harding Icefield can be seen from the summit.

== Gallery ==
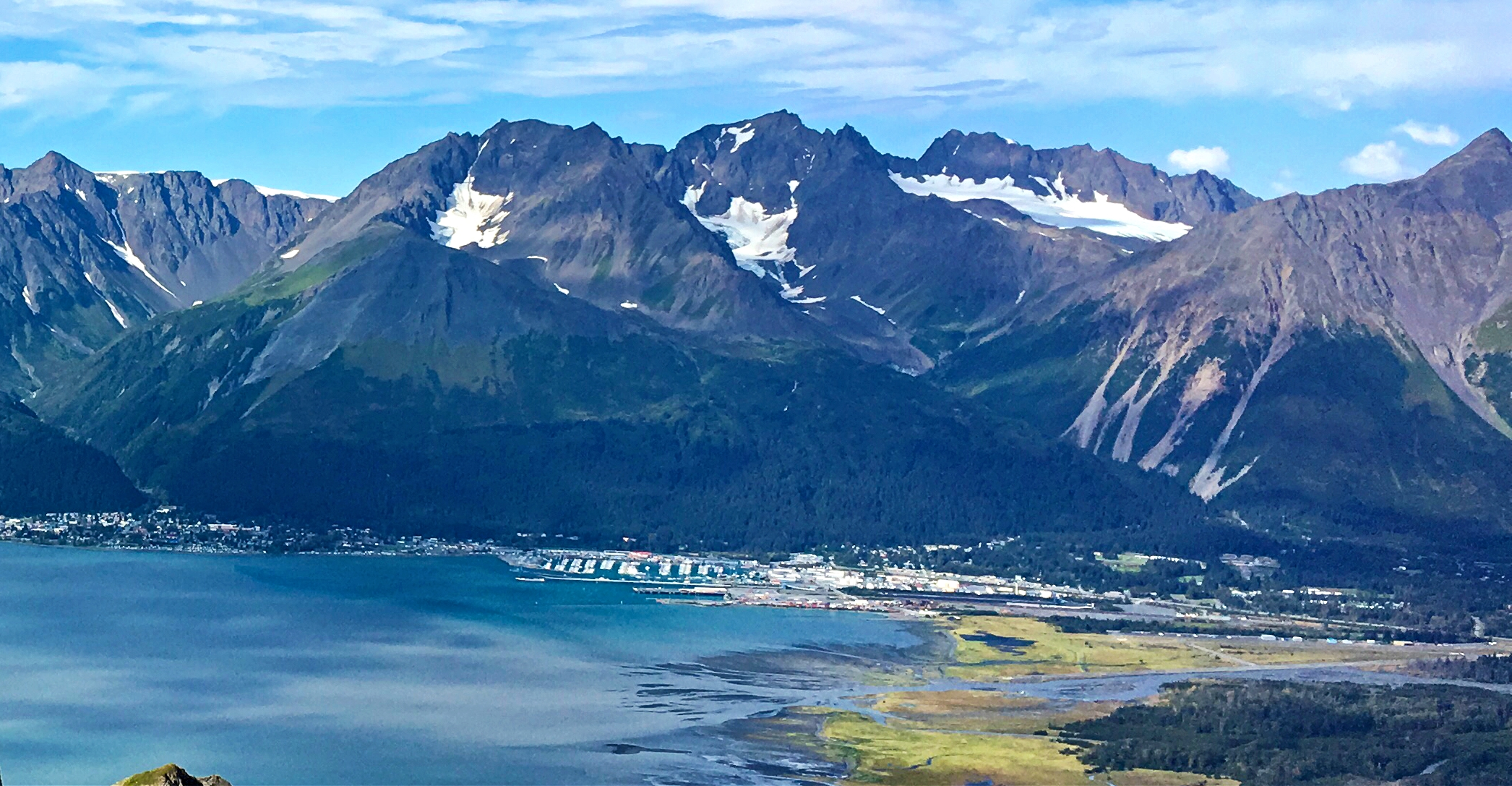
Phoenix Peak centered, with Marathon Mountain left of center and Mt. Benson at right edge. Resurrection Bay and Seward in lower half of frame.

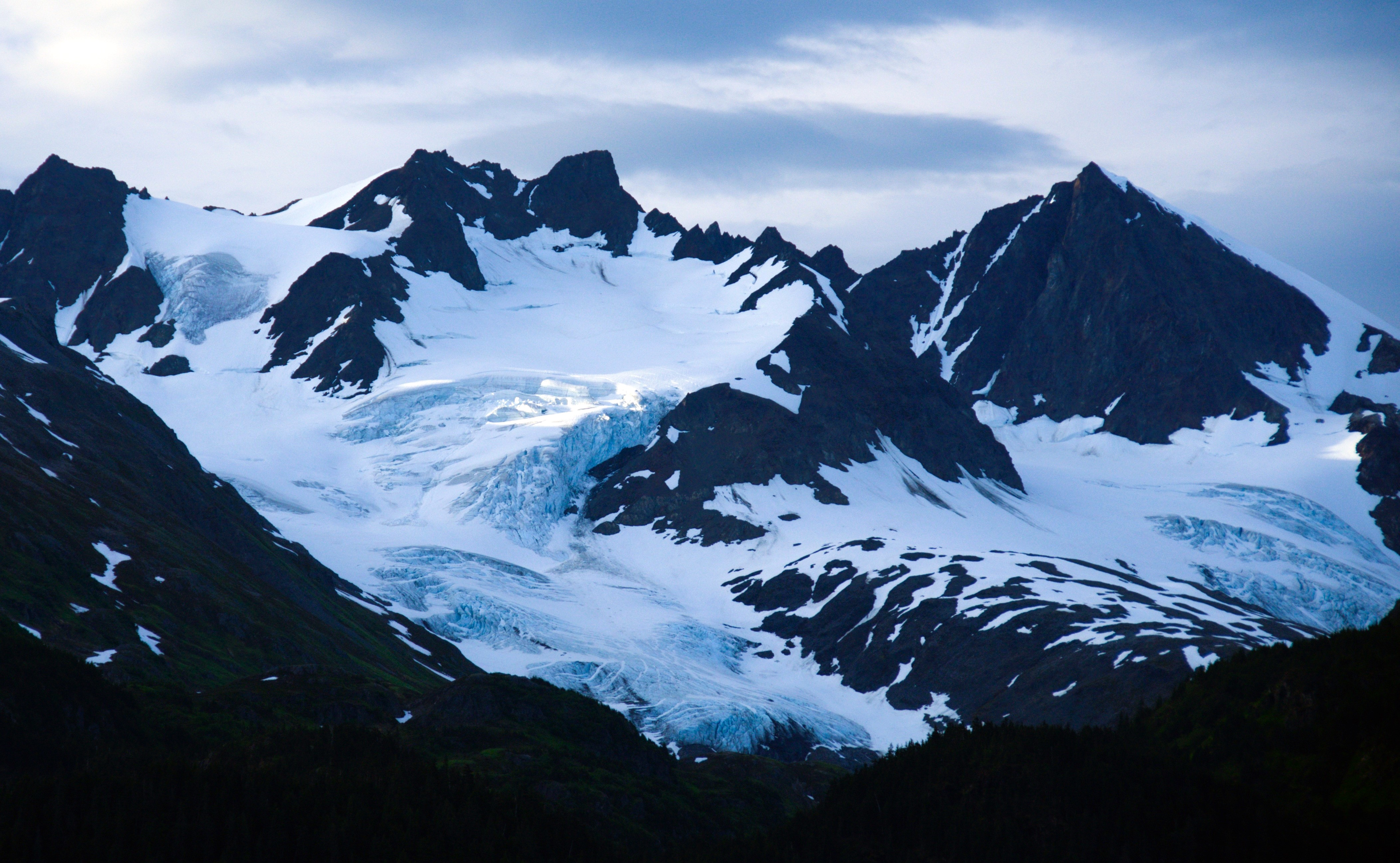
Summit to right, from northwest.

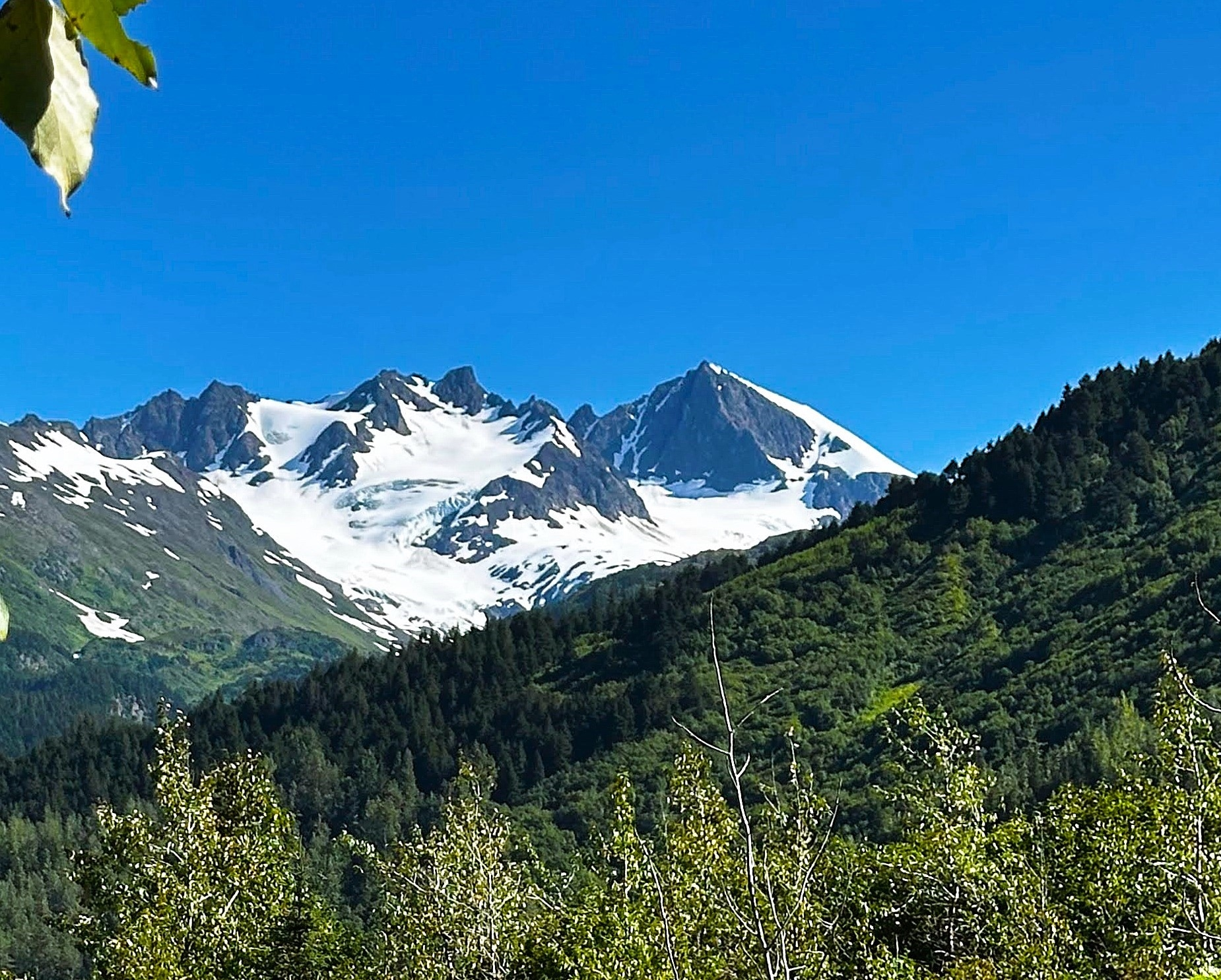
Summit to right of center, from northwest.

== See also ==
- List of mountain peaks of Alaska
- Geology of Alaska
