= Geology of Alaska =

The geology of Alaska includes Precambrian igneous and metamorphic rocks formed in offshore terranes and added to the western margin of North America from the Paleozoic through modern times. The region was submerged for much of the Paleozoic and Mesozoic and formed extensive oil and gas reserves due to tectonic activity in the Arctic Ocean. Alaska was largely ice free during the Pleistocene, allowing humans to migrate into the Americas.

== Geologic history, stratigraphy and tectonics ==
Compared with other areas of the North American continent, Alaska formed in the recent geologic past. Until 200 million years ago, western North America terminated at the Rocky Mountains, 120 miles further inland than the current shoreline, until the addition of the Yukon–Tanana terrane.

The Birch Creek Schist is the oldest rock in Alaska's interior and forms the core of the Yukon-Tanana Terrane with muscovite-quartz schist, mica quartzite and graphite schist. This intensely folded and rock unit extends from Fairbanks into the Yukon Territory in Canada and formed between 800 and 600 million years ago in the Proterozoic, due to the metamorphism of shale, sandstone and mudstone along the western margin of the continent.

A different schist belt may underlie the Brooks Range and is known from deep boreholes in the vicinity of Prudhoe Bay, reaching greenschist and blueschist on the sequence of metamorphic facies. Precambrian metasedimentary gneiss is found in the Kigluaik Mountains on the Seward Peninsula, while in southeast Alaska, additional Precambrian rocks underlie Prince of Wales Island.

=== Paleozoic (539-251 million years ago) ===
Throughout the Paleozoic, a marine shelf environment dominated the western edge of the proto-North American continent Laurentia, becoming deeper over time and experiencing widespread volcanism over 5000 square kilometers, as well as the deposition of carbonates, mudstone and sandstone. Volcanic rocks remain in the Keevy Peak Formation in the Northern Alaska Range and metamorphosed into the Totatlanika Schist in the interior, as well as in the Alexander terrane in the southeast.

=== Mesozoic (251-66 million years ago) ===
In the Mesozoic, North America separated from the supercontinent Pangea which had formed in the late Paleozoic. Oceanic plates in the Pacific Ocean subducted in trenches offshore, carrying volatiles such as water and carbon dioxide with them, leading to rock melting and volcanic activity. Intense volcanism built up Alaska's mountains until a slowing of eruptions in the late Cretaceous around 80 million years ago.

During the Middle Triassic three large terranes—Wrangellia, Alexander and Stikine—remained offshore as separate island arcs not yet joined to the continent. The Wrangellia and Alexander terranes merged offshore by the Middle Jurassic and experienced folding and faulting during a collision with Alaska in the Cretaceous. The addition of the terranes generated metamorphism and led to the intrusion of huge amounts of granite in the Coastal Ranges. By the end of the Cretaceous, a fourth landmass—the Chugach terrane—docked with Alaska. Geologists have interpreted the Alexander terrane as a volcanic island chain surrounded by coral atolls, given volcanic rocks, chert and limestone from the Paleozoic. Rocks in Glacier Bay and the Heceta-Tuxekan Islands to the west of Prince of Wales Island preserve clam shells and reef life. In many locations, Alexander terrane limestone rests on top of conglomerate made up of beach boulders. Volcanic rocks, carbonates and phyllite overlie these lower rock units, intruded by Jurassic igneous rocks. Many sections of the terrane are highly metamorphosed and broken into smaller blocks by faults, such as the Chatham Strait Fault, which offsets rocks up to 120 miles. The Stikine terrane includes Paleozoic volcanic rocks interbedded with marine shale, limestone and sandstone, overlain by Jurassic and Cretaceous sedimentary and igneous rocks. Thrust faults and the Chatham Strait Fault separate the small Taku terrane from neighboring terranes. It is marked by metamorphosed andesite, rhyolite and basalt with small amounts of limestone, marble and conglomerate. On top of the Coast Range batholith are remnant metamorphic rocks from the gneiss, schist and marble dominant Tracy Arm terrane.

The Wrangellia terrane, as one of the largest in Alaska formed beginning 300 million years ago in the Pennsylvanian and built up with basalt, carbonate and phyllite during the Triassic (these rocks are exposed from the Alaska Range to the Wrangell Mountains). Originating as a volcanic island arc, Wrangellia exhausted its magma supply and began to sink, although renewed volcanism built up basalt and the Nikolai greenstone above the water level, until the new land sank again covered over by limestone and deep water sediments. The Chugach terrane, by contrast, is made up of turbidite deposits from the Mesozoic, along with conglomerate, shale and volcanic rocks. Apatite and zircon thermochronology data demonstrates that magmatic arcs began cooling from Late Jurassic to Early Cretaceous followed by a long slow cooling phase and little uplift.

During the Cretaceous, tectonic activity in the Arctic Ocean created a series of sediment filled basins, which now host oil and gas deposits, underlying the continental shelf of northern Alaska. Organic-rich shale overlies a major unconformity in the area, acting as the source rock for hydrocarbons. Plate rotation produced the Brooks Range with a plate collision visible at the surface in the Kobuk River. Paleozoic and Mesozoic rocks separated from the descending slab, leaving mineral deposits in the Brook Range related to older rock units.

=== Cenozoic (66 million years ago-present) ===
The Talkeetna Mountains north of Anchorage preserve granite formed from igneous activity during the Cenozoic accretion of the Chugach terrane. During the Eocene, the Prince William terrane was joined to Alaska. The Eocene brought a change in the motion of the Pacific Plate, marked by a bend in the Emperor Seamount–Hawaiian Islands linear chain of volcanoes. The small Kula plate, which was being overridden by the Eurasian and North American plates in the Mesozoic, became "jammed" in place, creating the Bering Sea shelf. The St. George and Navarin extensional basins formed in the Bering Strait and filled with sediments.

Thermochronology data helps to constrain the time of terrane accretion, cooling of magmatic bodies and exhumation of continental crust. Following gradual cooling of Late Mesozoic volcanic bodies of the Wrangellia Composite Terrain, a secondary cooling phase in the forearc initiated in the Late Paleocene to Early Eocene coincident with spreading ridge subduction. This initiated a significant reorganization of plate boundaries and motion resulting in a regional cessation of magmatism, rapid uplift and unroofing north of the Denali fault zone, formation of transform transgressional faults, and subduction of the pacific and Yakutat microplates under the North American margin. Collision of the micro plate starting in the Eocene has resulted in deformation and exhumation of volcanic and metamorphic rocks from depths of at least 10 km. The rate at which this uplift has proceeded is estimated at around 5 km per million years, much faster than regional averages.

For much of the Cenozoic, Alaska experienced very cold conditions, preserved by fossils in the 5000 foot thick terrestrial sediments of the Chickaloon Formation in the Cook Inlet. By 10 to 13 million years ago, mountain glaciers had formed. A steady supply of moisture from the Pacific Ocean supported coastal glaciers beginning five million years ago, recorded by the glacial mudstone of the Yakataga Formation along the Gulf of Alaska.

During the Pleistocene, the interior of Alaska remained ice free, except for the Yukon-Tanana Upland west of Fairbanks, which experienced six phases of glaciation (the western Alaska Range experienced the same number, while the Brooks Range experienced four). North of the Brooks Range, a polar desert developed with windblown sand dunes. Mammoth steppe allowed humans to cross into North America from Siberia.

A return to cold conditions 3000 years ago in the Holocene brought major glacial advances in Glacier Bay and Icy Strait, reaching new maximums by 1750 before going into retreat.

Currently, Alaska is experiencing an ongoing terrane collision, with the uplift of the Saint Elias Mountains by the Yakutat Block, volcanism and deep granite formation.
