= Kenai Mountains =

Mountain range in Alaska, United States

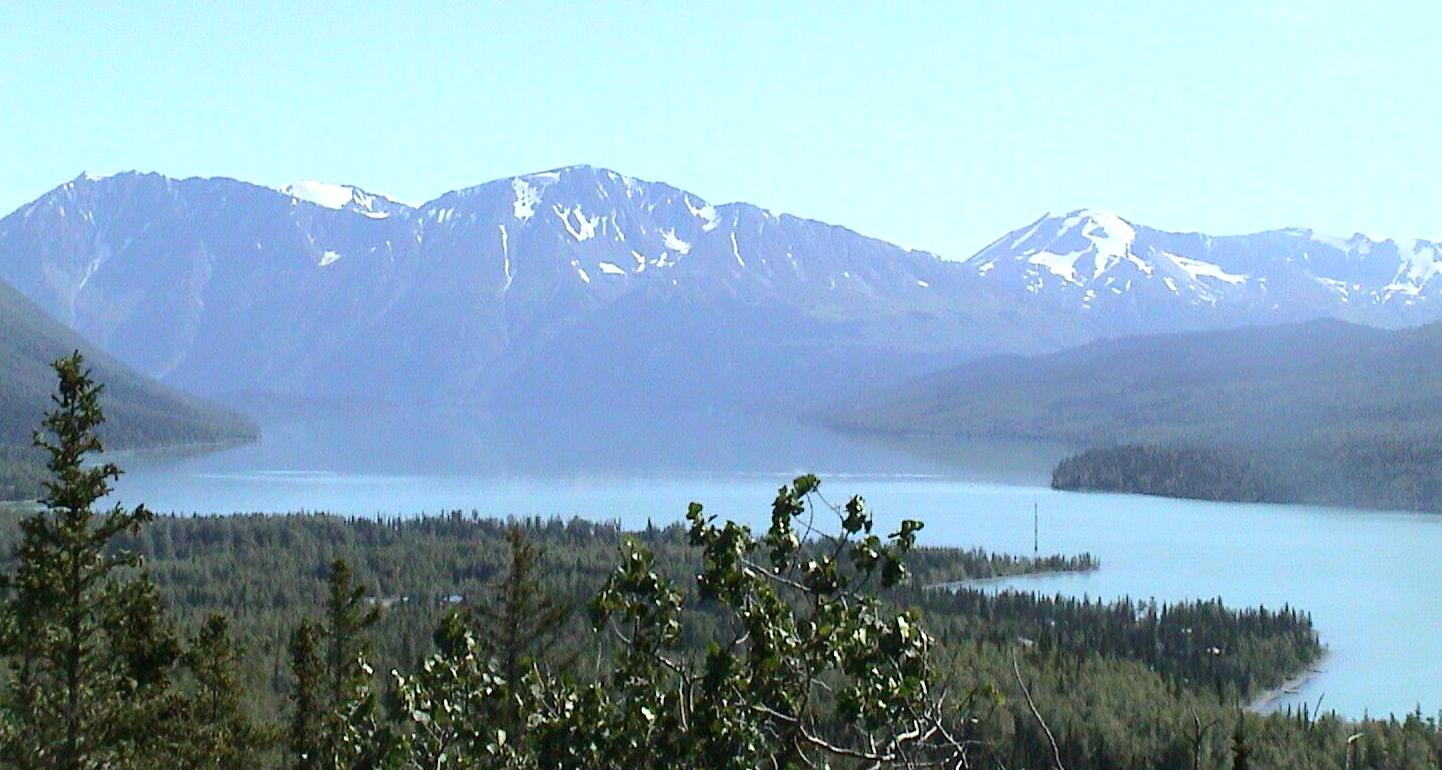

Highest point
- Elevation: 4,980 ft (1,520 m)
- Coordinates: 59°41′32″N 150°36′56″W

Naming
- Native name: Yaghanen Dghili (Denaʼina)

Geography
- Country: United States
- State: Alaska
- Borough: Kenai Peninsula Borough
- Range coordinates: 59°41′32″N 150°36′56″W
- Parent range: Chugach Mountains
- Topo map: USGS Seldovia C-2 NW

The Kenai Mountains (Dena'ina: Yaghanen Dghili) are a mountain range in the U.S. state of Alaska. They extend 120 miles (190 km) northeast from the southern end of the Kenai Peninsula to the Chugach Mountains, and have an average elevation of 3,000 to 5,000 feet.

The Harding and Sargent Icefields, as well as the many glaciers that emanate from them, originate in the Kenai Mountains. Several prime fish-producing rivers, including the Kenai River and the Russian River, also flow from the mountains.

The Dena'ina call the mountains Yaghanen Dghili, meaning "good land mountains". The name "Kenai" was first published by Constantin Grewingk in 1849, who obtained his information from I. G. Wosnesenski's account of a voyage to the area in 1842.

== Gallery ==
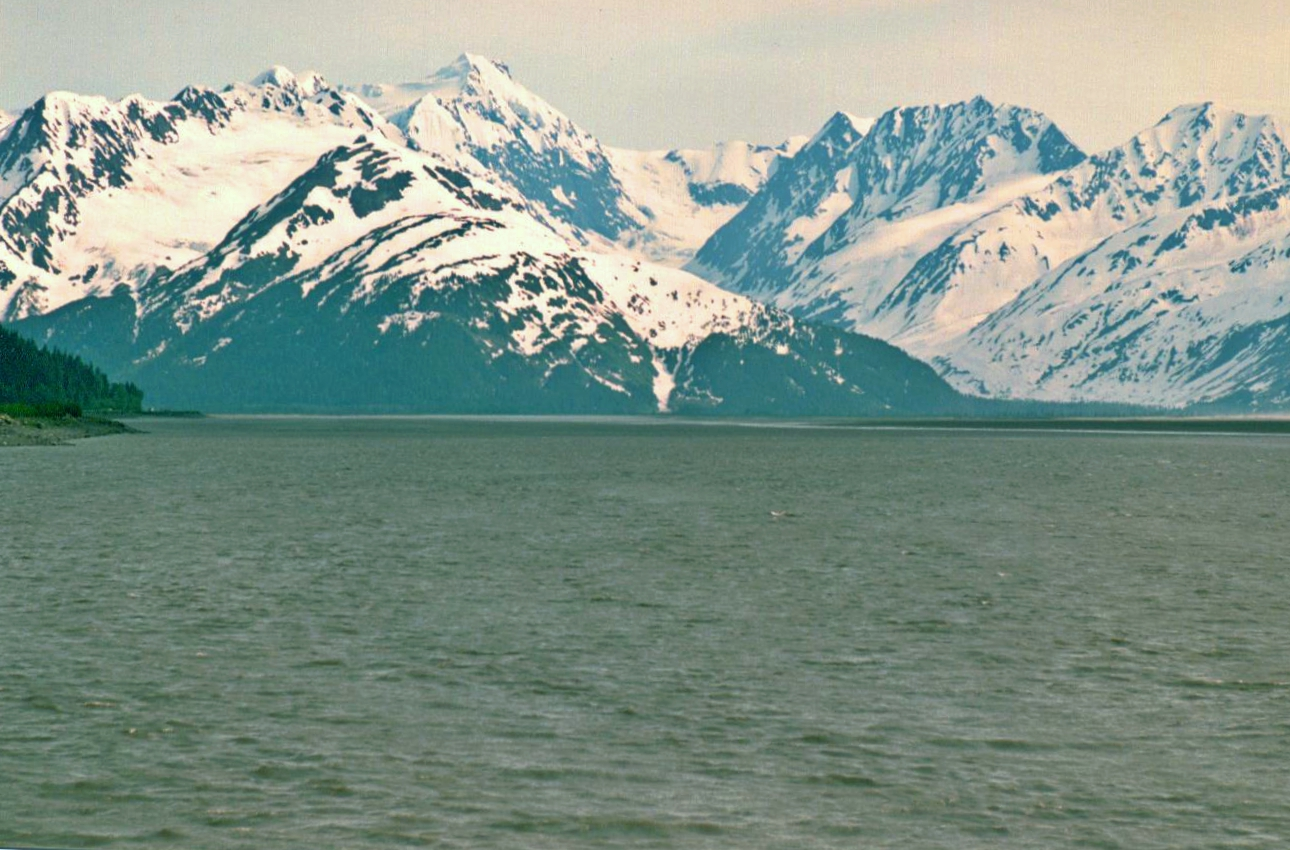
Carpathian Peak seen from Turnagain Arm

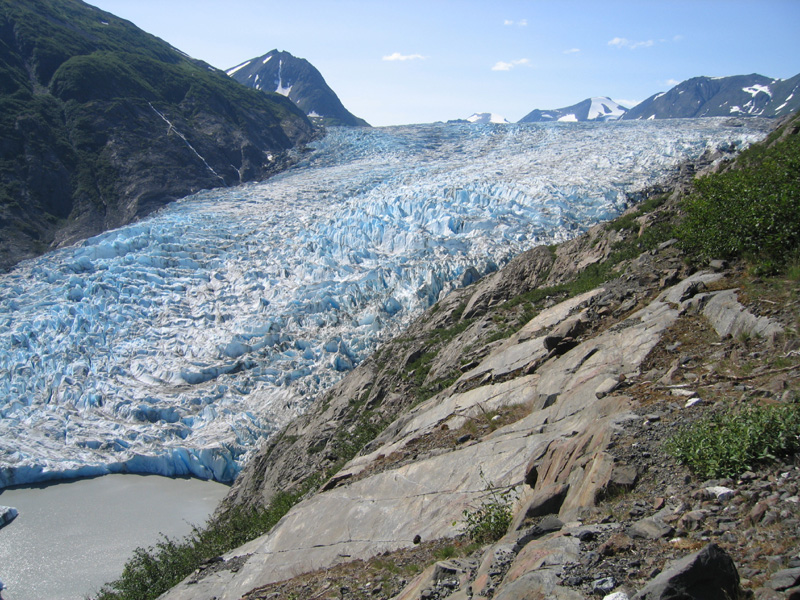
Skilak Glacier in the Kenai Mountains

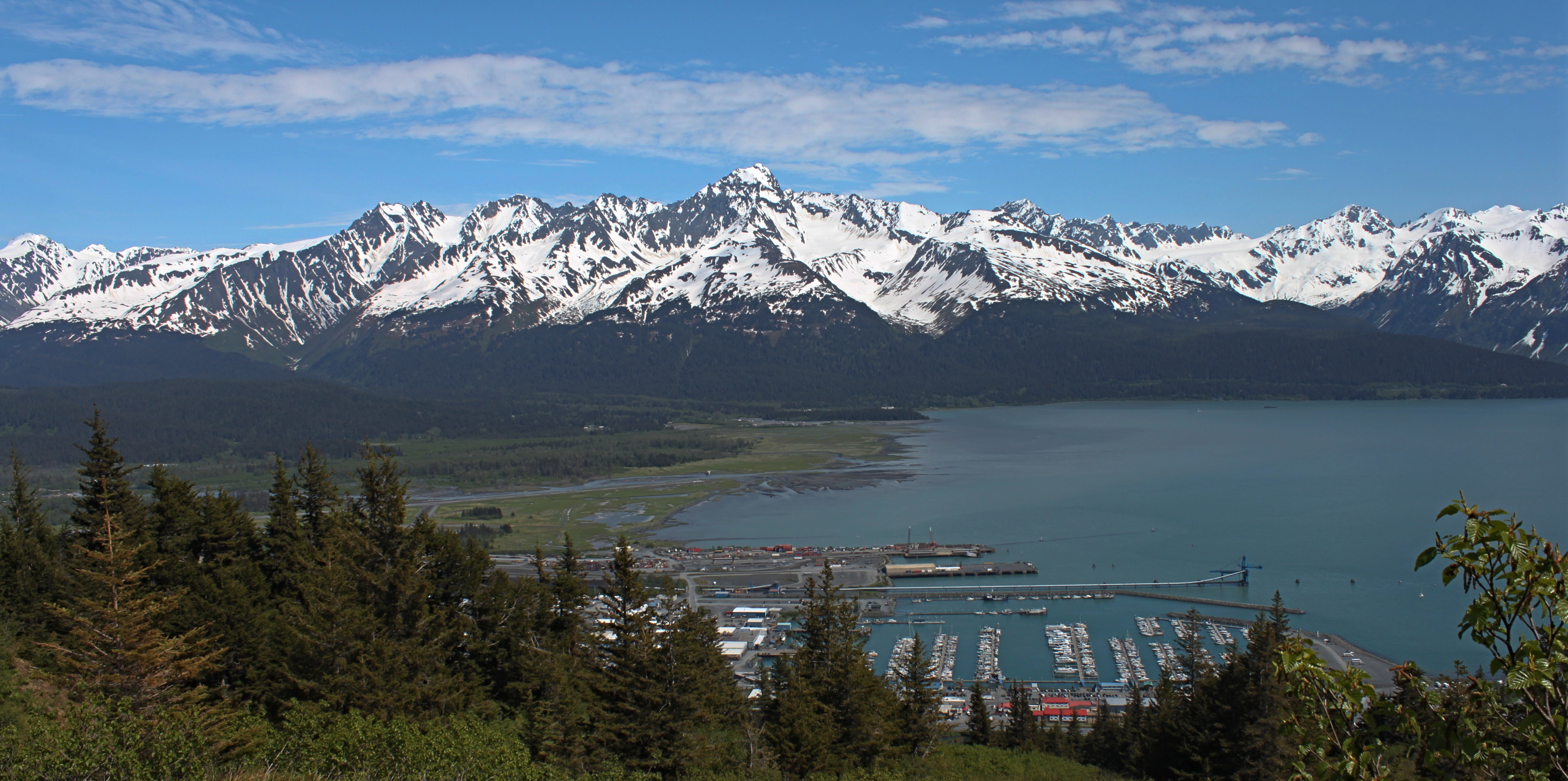
Mount Alice seen from Mount Marathon

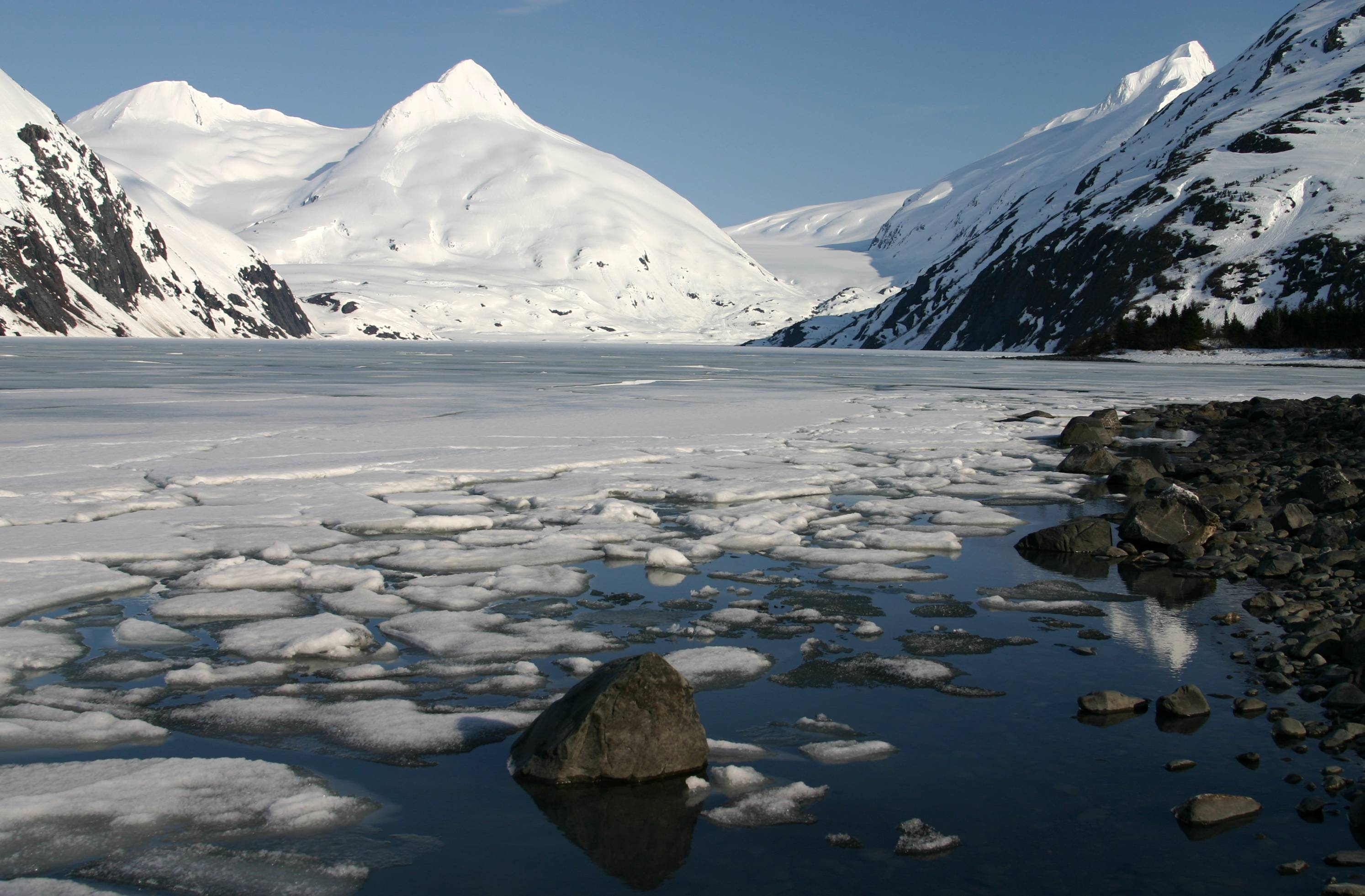
Looking across Portage Lake toward Bard Peak

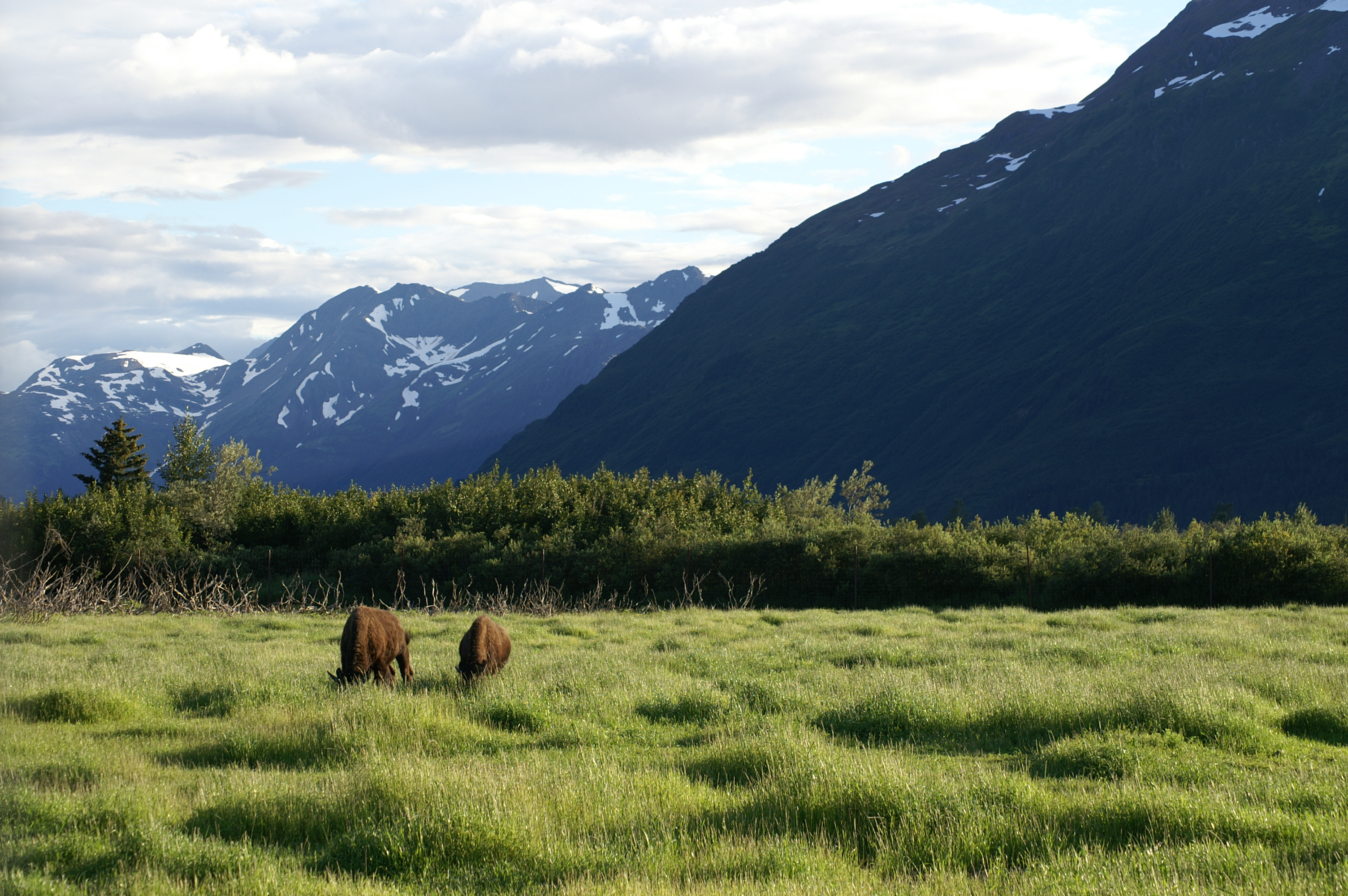
Wood Bison grazing near Kenai Mountains

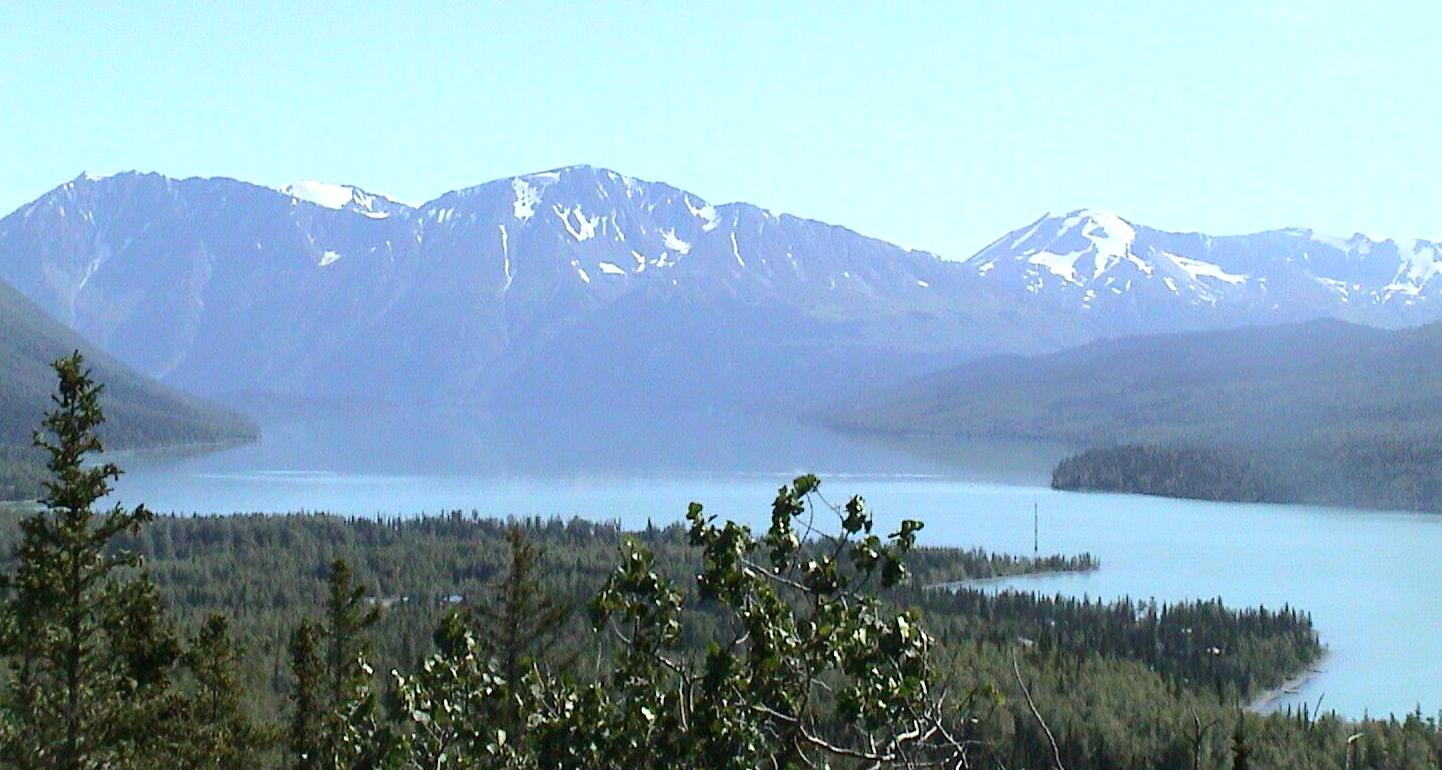
The Kenai Mountains and River
