= Paradise Peak (Kenai Mountains) =

Mountain in Alaska, United States

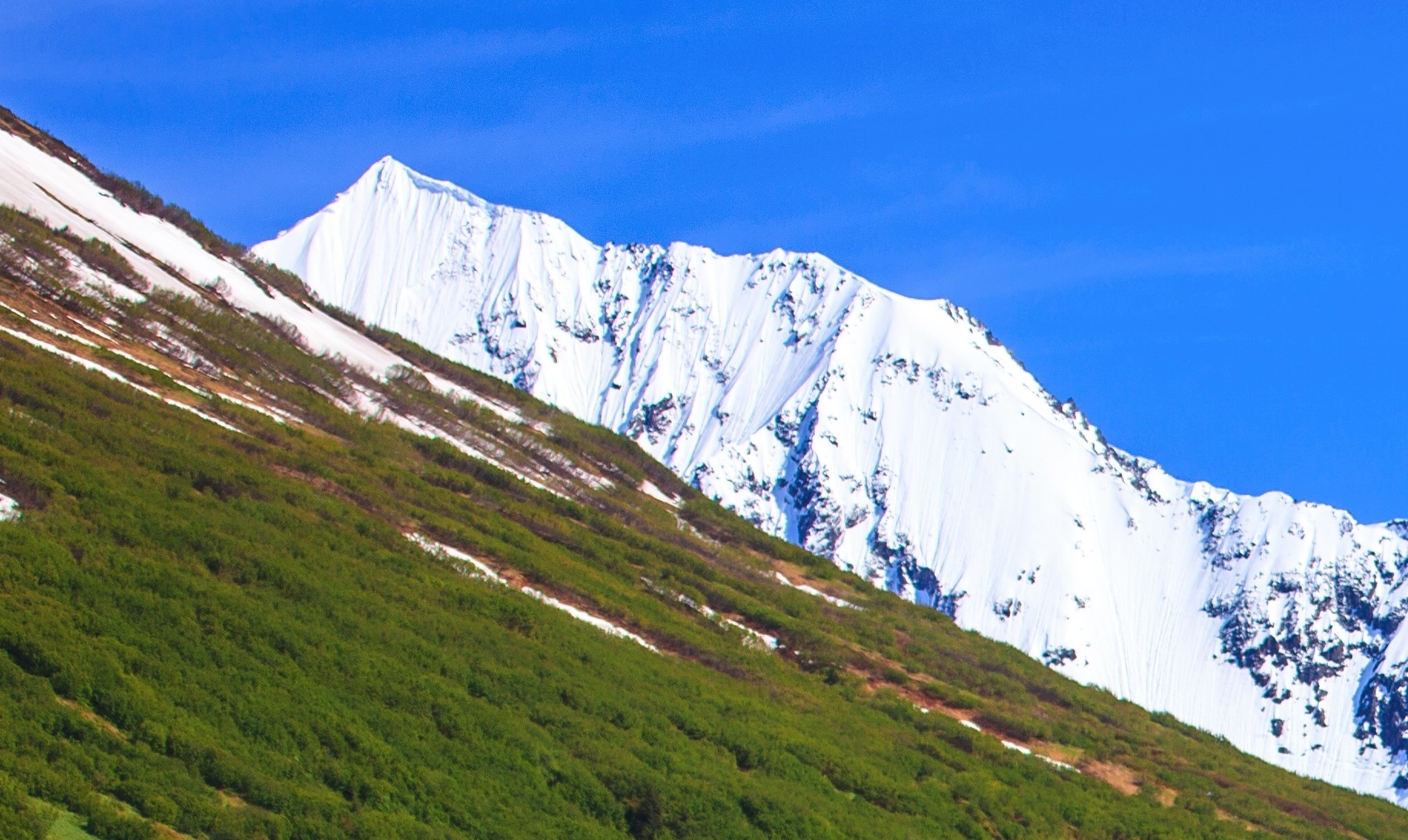
- Northwest aspect

Highest point
- Elevation: 6,050 ft (1,844 m)
- Prominence: 1,100 ft (335 m)
- Parent peak: Hearth Mountain (6,182 ft)
- Isolation: 2.54 mi (4.09 km)
- Coordinates: 60°16′00″N 149°11′34″W

Geography
- Location within Alaska
- Interactive map of Paradise Peak
- Country: United States
- State: Alaska
- Borough: Kenai Peninsula
- Protected area: Chugach National Forest
- Parent range: Kenai Mountains
- Topo map: USGS Seward B-6

Climbing
- First ascent: 1969 Grace Hoeman

Paradise Peak is a 6,050-foot-elevation (1,844-meter) mountain summit in Alaska, United States.

== Description ==
Paradise Peak is located 14 miles (23 km) northeast of Seward in the Kenai Mountains, on land managed by Chugach National Forest. Precipitation runoff and glacial meltwater from the mountain's slopes drains to Kenai Lake via the Snow River. Although modest in elevation, topographic relief is significant as the summit rises over 4,800 feet (1,463 m) above Paradise Valley in 1.5 miles (2.4 km). The mountain is named in association with Paradise Valley which it borders, and the toponym was officially adopted in 1971 by the United States Board on Geographic Names. The first ascent of the summit was made on June 29, 1969, by Grace Hoeman via the West Ridge.

== Climate ==
Based on the Köppen climate classification, Paradise Peak is located in a tundra climate zone with long, cold, snowy winters, and mild summers. Weather systems coming off the Gulf of Alaska are forced upwards by the Kenai Mountains (orographic lift), causing heavy precipitation in the form of rainfall and snowfall. Winter temperatures can drop below 0 °F with wind chill factors below −10 °F. This climate supports several glaciers on the peak's slopes, two of which are unofficially named Fireside Glacier and Hearth Glacier.

== Gallery ==
West aspect

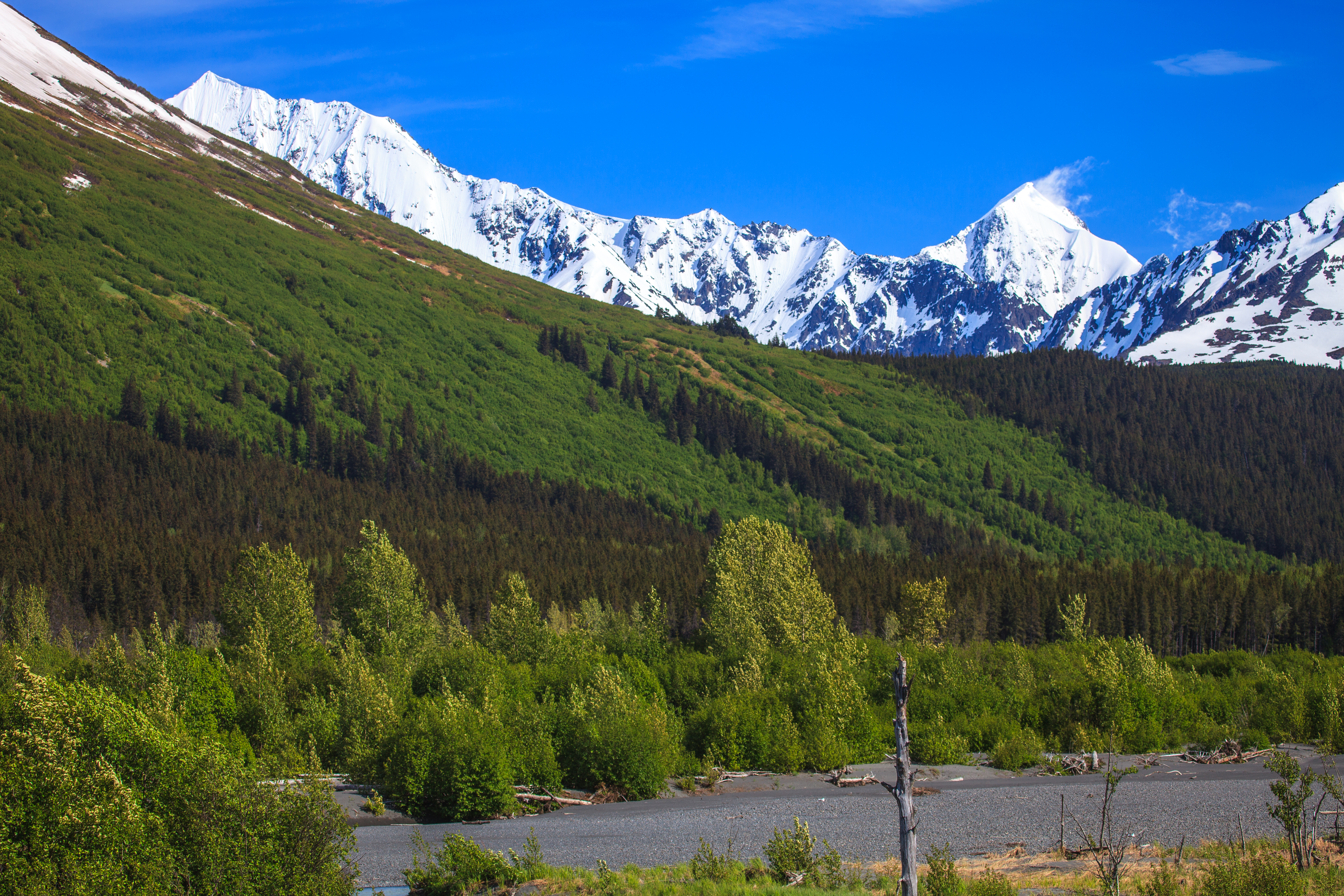
Paradise Peak (left) and Hearth Mountain (right)

== See also ==
- List of mountain peaks of Alaska
- Geography of Alaska
