= Mount Grace (Chugach Mountains) =

Mountain in Alaska, U.S.

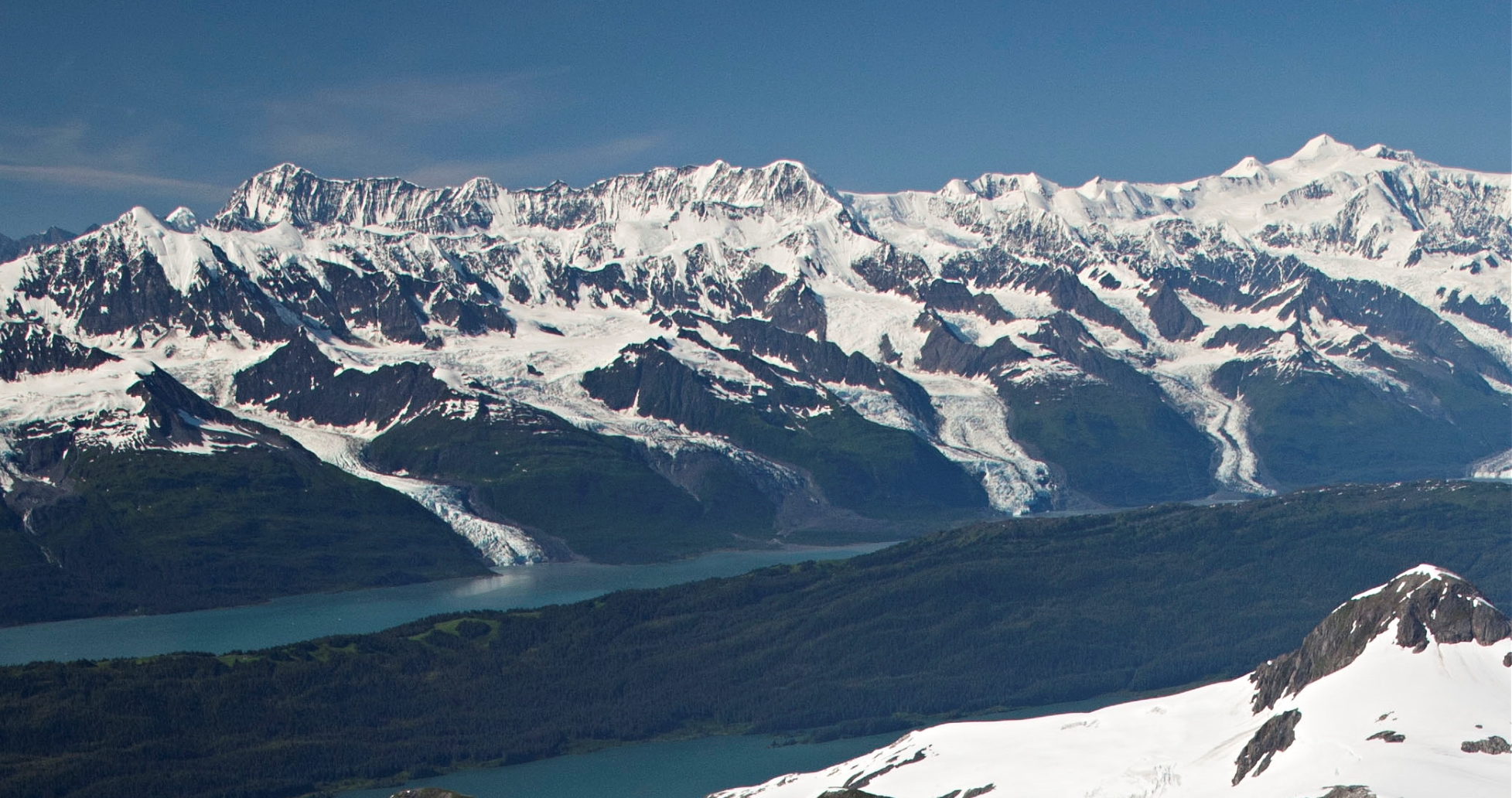
- Mount Grace centered, from the south (Mt. Goode on left, Mt. Marcus Baker to right)

Highest point
- Elevation: 10,540 ft (3,210 m)
- Prominence: 990 ft (300 m)
- Parent peak: Mount Goode
- Isolation: 3.31 mi (5.33 km)
- Coordinates: 61°19′06″N 147°53′12″W

Geography
- Location within Alaska
- Interactive map of Mount Grace
- Location: Chugach National Forest; Chugach Census Area; Alaska, United States
- Parent range: Chugach Mountains
- Topo map: USGS Anchorage B-3

Mount Grace is a remote 10,540-foot (3,213 m) glaciated mountain summit located in the Chugach Mountains, in the U.S. state of Alaska. The unofficially named peak is situated 63 mi (101 km) east of Anchorage, 6 mi (10 km) north of College Fjord, 3.35 mi (5 km) east of Mount Goode, and 9.37 mi (15 km) southwest of Mount Marcus Baker, on land managed by Chugach National Forest.

== Grace Hoeman ==
Dr. Grace (Jansen) Hoeman (1921–1971) was an accomplished mountaineer and physician in Anchorage. She climbed in excess of 120 peaks in Alaska, many with her husband, Vin Hoeman, who died in an avalanche on Nepal's Dhaulagiri two years before she met a similar fate. She perished in an avalanche on Eklutna Glacier in the Chugach Mountains near Anchorage on April 12, 1971. She made 20 first ascents in Alaska, several solo. In 1970 she led an all-women expedition to the summit of Denali via the West Buttress route. Mt. Grace is connected to Mt. Goode by a high ridge, and the first ascent of Goode was made in April 1966 by Vin Hoeman.

== Climate ==
Based on the Köppen climate classification, Mount Grace is located in a subarctic climate zone with long, cold, snowy winters, and cool summers. Weather systems coming off the Gulf of Alaska are forced upwards by the Chugach Mountains (orographic lift), causing heavy precipitation in the form of rainfall and snowfall. Temperatures can drop below −20 °C with wind chill factors below −30 °C. This climate supports the Knik Glacier which surrounds the mountain. The months May through June offer the most favorable weather for climbing.

== Gallery ==
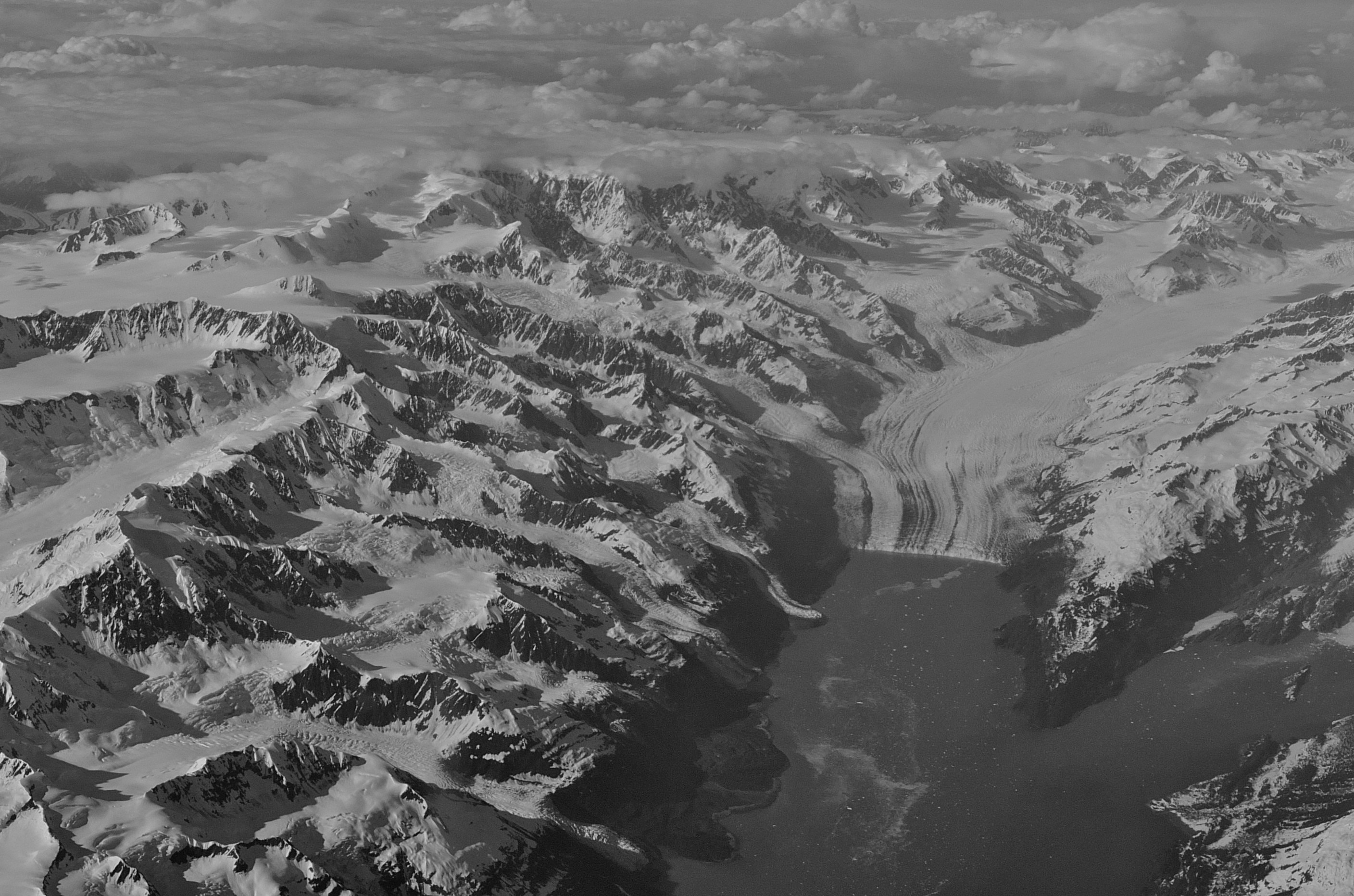
Mount Grace to left

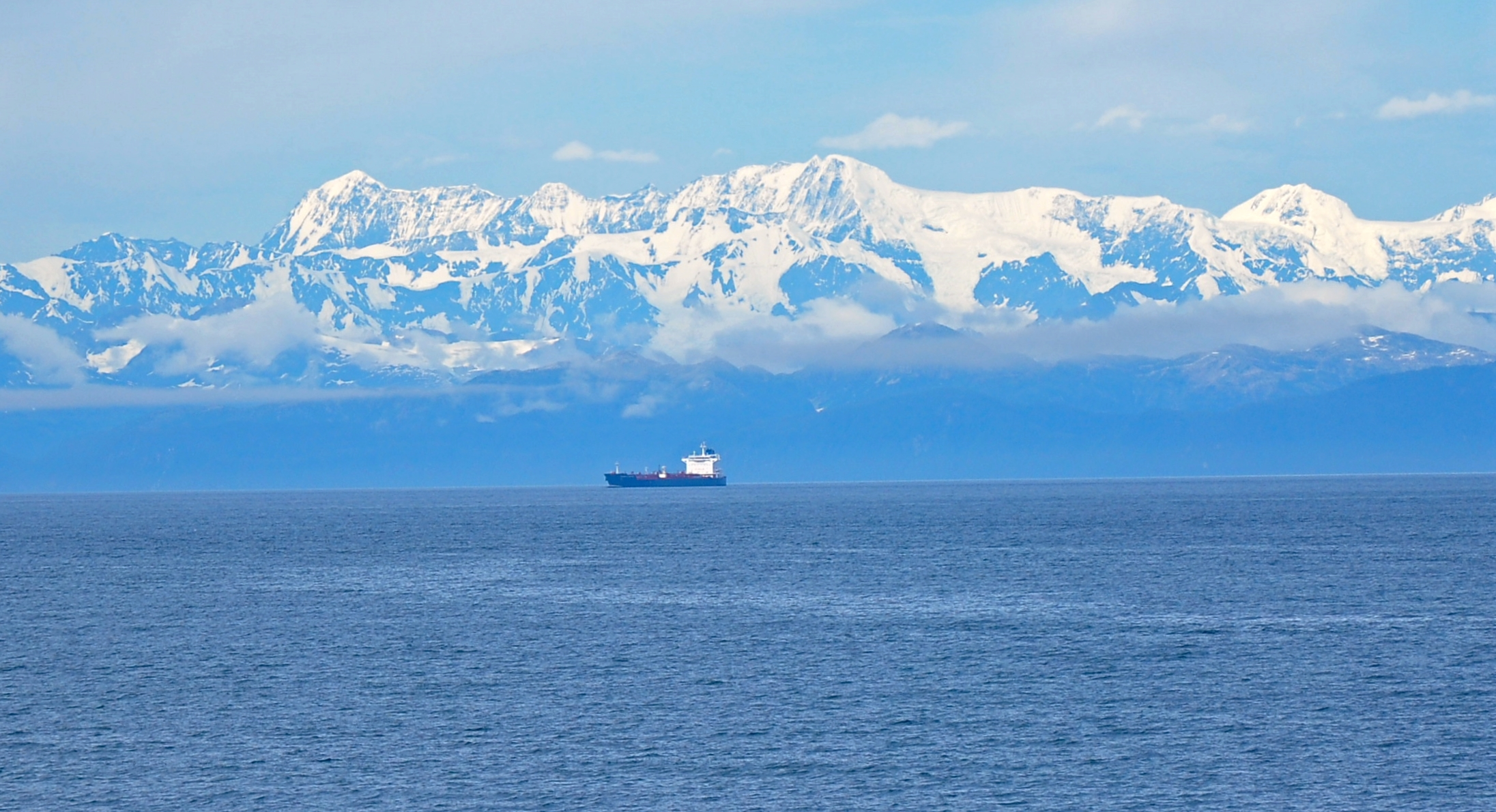
Mount Grace from Prince William Sound

== See also ==
- List of mountain peaks of Alaska
- Geography of Alaska
