= Mount Goode =

Mountain located in the Chugach, Alaska

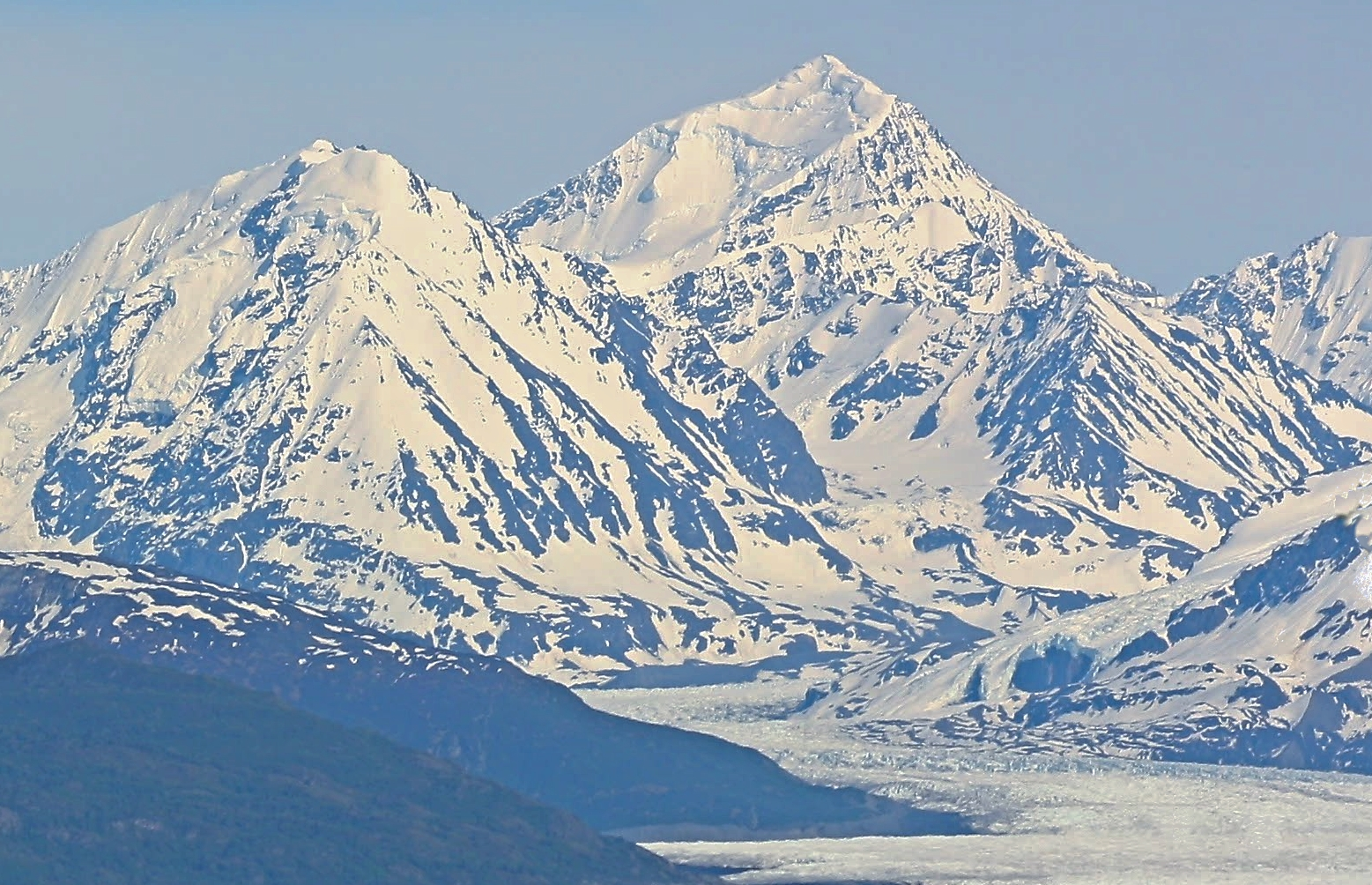
- Mount Goode, west aspect

Highest point
- Elevation: 10,610 ft (3,230 m)
- Prominence: 2,160 ft (660 m)
- Parent peak: Mount Marcus Baker
- Isolation: 7.57 mi (12.18 km)
- Coordinates: 61°19′35″N 147°59′09″W

Geography
- Location within Alaska
- Interactive map of Mount Goode
- Location: Chugach National Forest; Chugach Census Area; Alaska, United States
- Parent range: Chugach Mountains
- Topo map: USGS Anchorage B-3

Climbing
- First ascent: 1966
- Easiest route: East Ridge (Alaska Grade 1)

Mount Goode, pronounced like "good", is a prominent 10,610-foot (3,234 m) glaciated mountain summit located in the Chugach Mountains, in the U.S. state of Alaska. The peak is situated 60 mi (97 km) east of Anchorage, 10 mi (16 km) northwest of College Fjord, 3.35 mi (5 km) west of Mount Grace, and 10.9 mi (18 km) southwest of Mount Marcus Baker, on land managed by Chugach National Forest.

== History ==
This mountain is called Skitnu Dghelaya, meaning Brush River Mountain, in the Denaʼina language. The Mount Goode name was officially adopted March 5, 1924, by the U.S. Board on Geographic Names to commemorate Richard Urquhart Goode (1858-1903), geographer for the United States Geological Survey, in charge of the Pacific Division, Topographic Branch, at the time when work in the Alaska area was first conducted. The first ascent of the peak was made in April 1966 by John Vincent Hoeman and Helmut Tschaffert.

== Climate ==
Based on the Köppen climate classification, Mount Goode is located in a subarctic climate zone with long, cold, snowy winters, and cool summers. Winter temperatures can drop below −20 °C with wind chill factors below −30 °C. This climate supports the Knik Glacier which surrounds the mountain. The months May through June offer the most favorable weather for climbing.

== Gallery ==
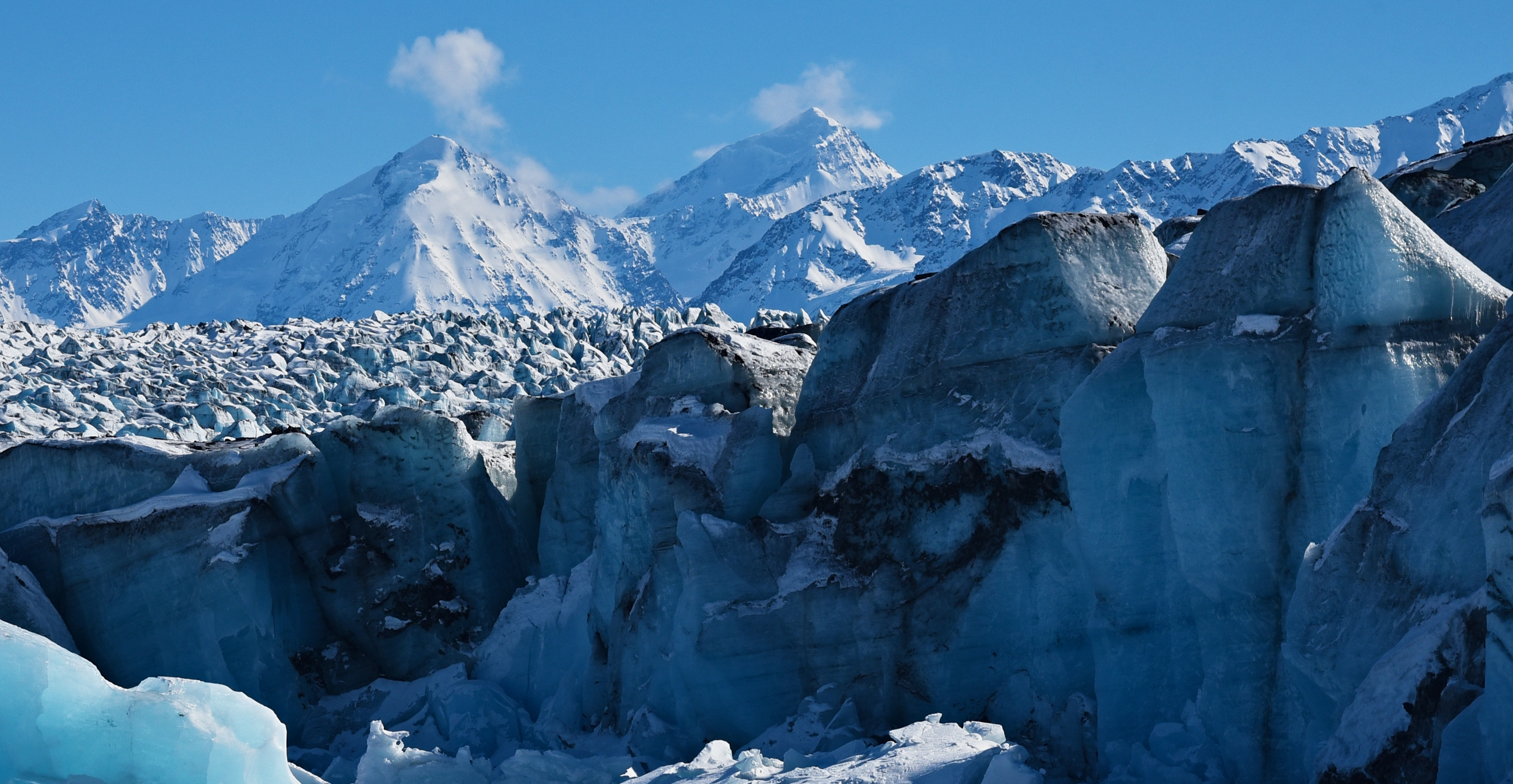
Mount Goode centered beyond Knik Glacier

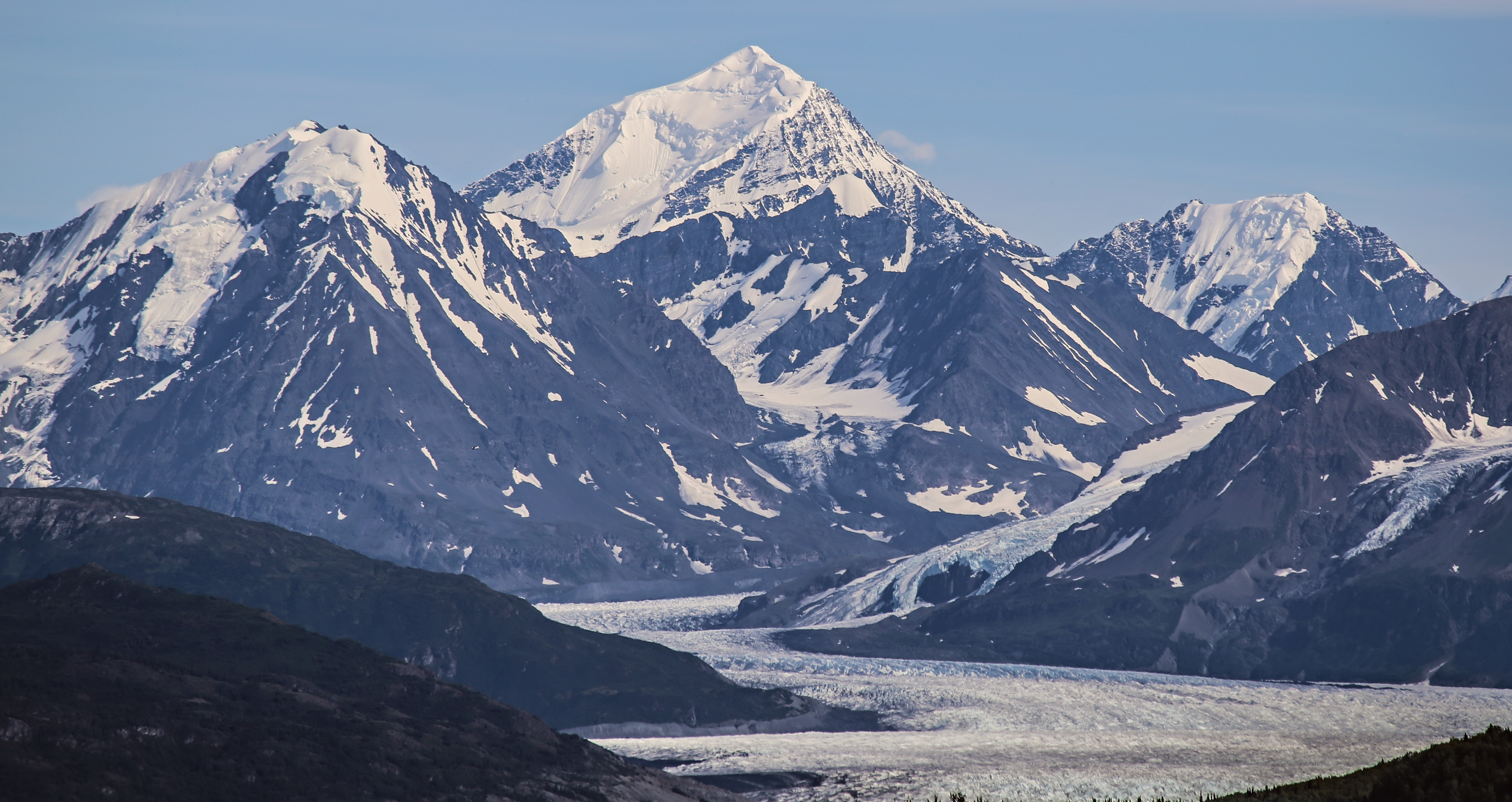
Mount Goode and Knik Glacier

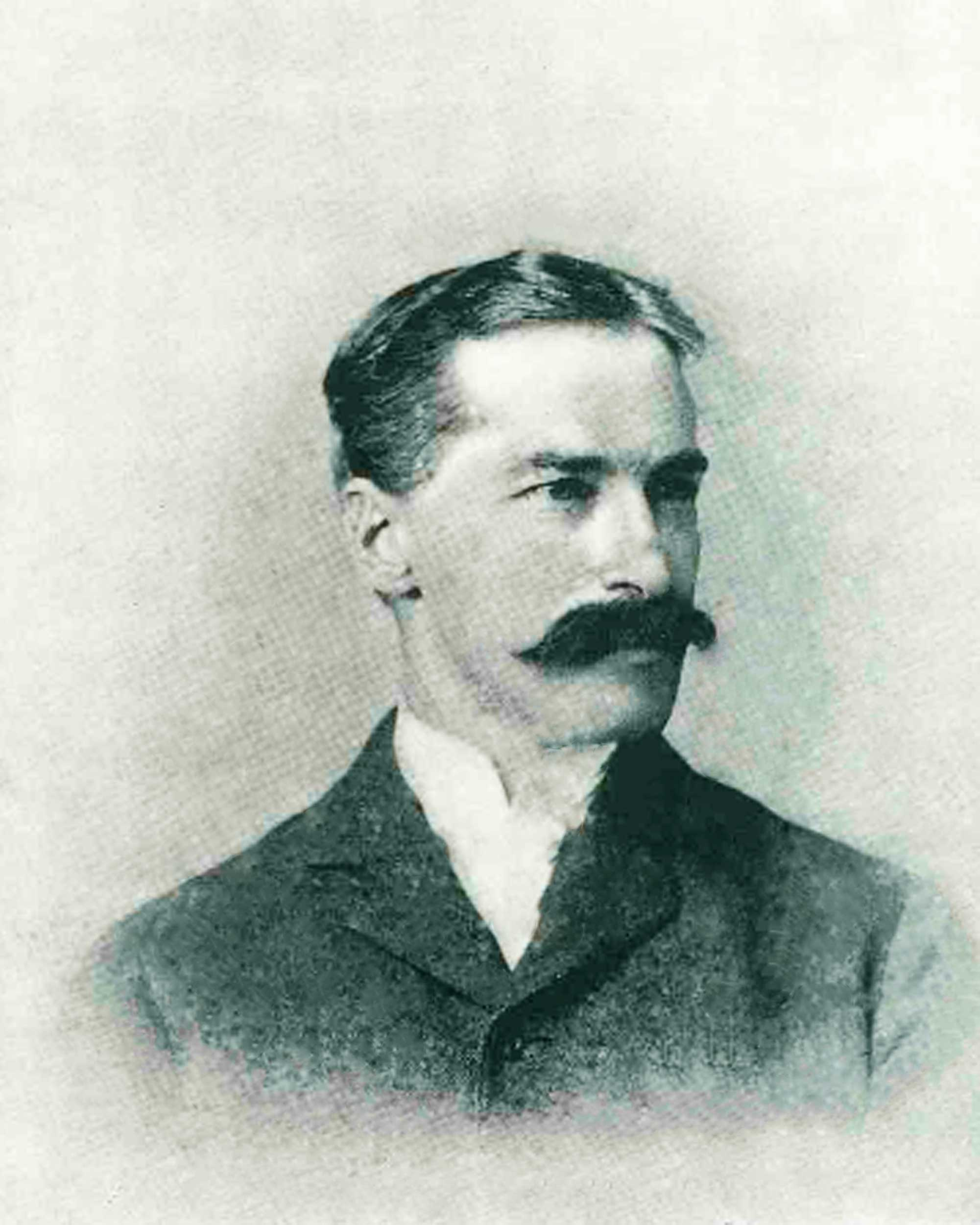
Richard U. Goode

== See also ==
- List of mountain peaks of Alaska
- Geography of Alaska
