= James W. Bagley =

American photographer (1881–1947)

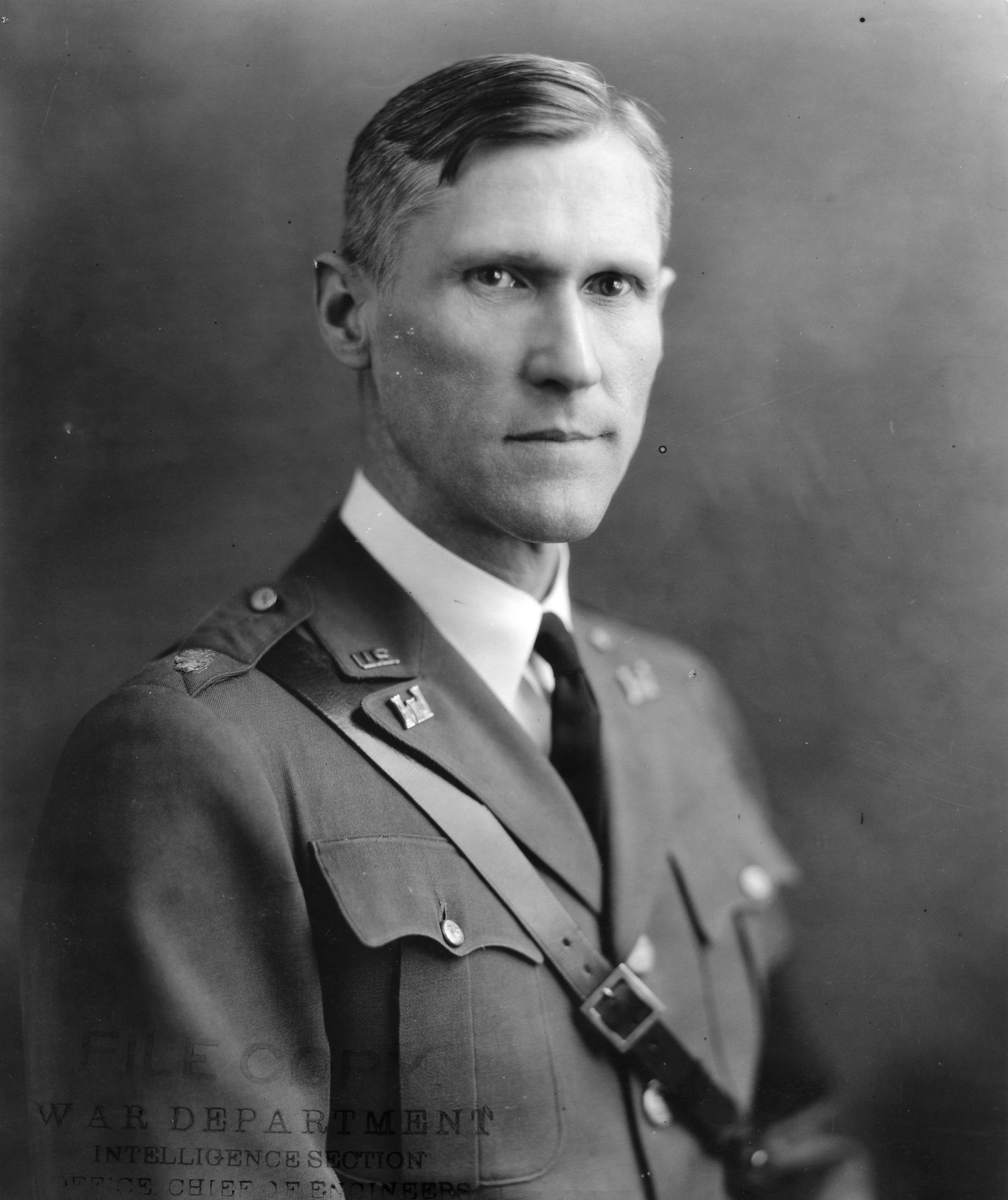
- Bagley, U.S. Army Corps of Engineers topographic engineer, and commander of the 29th Engineer Regiment
- Born: James Warren Bagley; October 31, 1881; Fayetteville, Tennessee
- Died: February 19, 1947 (aged 65); Chattanooga, Tennessee
- Occupation: topographic engineer
- Known for: topographic engineering, aerial photography, invention of cameras

Major James Warren Bagley (October 31, 1881 – February 19, 1947) was an American aerial photographer, topographic engineer and inventor.

== Early life ==
Bagley was born in Fayetteville, Tennessee. He took an early interest in mathematics and engineering, and attended Washington and Lee University, where he graduated in 1903. Edwin Raiz said in his obituary of Major Bagley, "James Warren Bagley was born on October 31, 1881, at Fayetteville. Tennessee, into a distinguished southern family. Even as a student he showed a marked interest in mathematics and engineering. He pursued his studies at Washington and Lee University, where he received a Phi Beta Kappa key. He was graduated in 1903."

Bagley was a popular athlete at his university, and during a football game between Washington and Lee and the Virginia Military Institute, he was badly injured while playing guard, and was carried unconscious from the field. There was a resulting rampage by the students that continued off the field, and into the town of Lexington and on to the campus of VMI. As a result, all games between these two schools were banned for the next fifty years.

== US Geological Survey ==
Bagley was an employee of the US Geological Survey from 1905 to 1917, when he was called into service for World War I. During his time with the USGS, he helped develop a panoramic camera used to document the topography and geology Alaska.

In 1911, James Bagley was instructed to return to Washington from his work in Alaska, and to come through Ottawa. He was instructed "to investigate the method of photo-topographic surveys in use by the Canadian government, with a view of obtaining information which will be useful in introducing these methods for some of the Alaskan surveys." That winter, Bagley, F. H. Moffit and J. B. Mertie, two geologists, developed their ideas for the construction of a tri-lens camera and transformer in 1916.

"The USGS surveyor most closely associated with the development and use of the panoramic camera system in Alaska was Maj. James W. Bagley. In 1917, Bagley wrote USGS Bulletin 657, The Use of the Panoramic Camera in Topographic Surveying. In retrospect, the history, justification, technical information, documentary evidence, and mathematical formulas found in this bulletin make it one of the most important publications ever produced on the scientific uses of the panorama. While most swing-lens panoramic cameras were used for scenic or group shots, Bagley found a way to use it for precise topographic measurements that would be used by geographers during this crucial period in Alaska's history."

"Major J. W. Bagley, assisted by Fred H. Moffit and for a part of the time by J. B. Mertie (all of the Division of Alaskan Mineral Resources) pursued experiments towards designing and constructing a tri-lens camera for taking airplane pictures on a continuous roll of film and a rectifying printer for restoring the scale of the wing exposures. This work was executed under the direction of the Chief of Engineers, U.S. Army, and the Director of the US Geological Survey. Sixteen engineer officers, most of whom were sent to different aviation fields in the country, were trained in the use of these instruments, and about 40 enlisted men assisted them in mapping areas, which included among others the airplane mail route from Washington to New York,, and the airplane route from Washington to Langley Field, Virginia."

Alfred H. Brooks also complimented Major Bagley in his preface to his USGS Bulletin: "The plate camera has heen used for many years in topographic surveying in the United States and Canada, as well as in many European countries, and since 1910 J. W. Bagley, a topographic engineer of the United States Geological Survey, has been employing the panoramic film camera in conjunction with the plane table in surveys in Alaska. Mr. Bagley has devised some new instruments and methods and has proved conclusively that the panoramic camera is extremely valuable in certain kinds of topographic work. Some of the results of his phototopographic surveys are presented in the maps accompanying this bulletin. These maps give conclusive evidence of the refinements that are made possible by the use of that instrument. The methods and instruments here described have thus far been used only in Alaska, but they promise to have a wider application in topographic surveys; hence this bulletin has been prepared. As the camera is used in conjunction with the plane table the bulletin includes also a brief account of the uses of the plane table. Mr. Bagley shows clearly that the field cost of surveys made by the use of the panoramic camera and plane table is far lower than that of surveys made by the plane table alone, and though the compilation of the field data in the office is more laborious the final cost of the completed map is nevertheless lower. The methods here described are especially applicable to regions where the field season is short, the field cost high, and the climatic conditions adverse to topographic work."

"Major Bagley was by no means the only USGS surveyor in Alaska using the panoramic camera. He was simply the most prolific, influential, and technically astute photographer the USGS had in these remote locations. His panoramic legacy may have been embodied and preserved in USGS Bulletin 657, but even as this went to press, Bagley had his sights set elsewhere. The last chapter of this 1917 bulletin discusses "the Application of Photogrammetry to Aerial Surveys." Even as panoramic land-based photography would continue at the USGS until at least 1932, Major Bagley already had his surveyor's eye trained at the skies and to the potential of aerial photography. The panoramic negatives and prints taken by Major Bagley and the others associated with this project eventually found their way to the USGS Photographic Library in Denver, Colorado."

Mr. Gerald Fitzgerald, Chief of the Topographic Branch of the US Geological Survey, said, "Do you have a copy of USGS Bulletin 657? that your father wrote? You must obtain a copy! That bulletin laid the groundwork for the entire field of photogrammetric surveying and map-making!"

"His first work was with the United States Geological Survey, from 1905 to 1917. His assignments took him all over the United States and to Alaska, where he mapped the Chugach Range. In connection with this work he developed a panoramic camera which enabled a surveyor to photograph the entire circle of the horizon in only three sections."

Part of his work at the USGS in Alaska was summarized in an article published some time later. In the article, Mr. Birdseye described the use and development of aerial photography and overlapping camera fields by Major Bagley.

== Aerial Photography in World War I ==
Bagley brought his recently invented tri-lens camera to France, where it was used to make one vertical and two oblique images from airplanes. These images were used to overprint enemy trenches and gun emplacements over existing maps for precision targeting. An example of this camera is held at the Smithsonian Institution: "This object is on display in the Boeing Aviation Hangar at the Steven F. Udvar-Hazy Center in Chantilly, VA. Fairchild Aerial Camera Corporation built the production model of the T 2 and T-2A four-lens camera, which improved upon the T-1 tri-lens mapping camera developed by Maj. James Bagley of the U.S. Army Signal Corps. The T-2A had one vertical lens and three oblique lenses set at 35 degrees, which provided a 120-degree field of view at right angles to the direction of flight. Four lens caps are also displayed."

Mr. Raiz said about his military career: "During the first World War he became captain and later major in the Corps of Engineers. Together with Captain Fred H. Moffit he developed the three-lens camera by which a much larger field could be photographed at a single flight than was possible with the single-lens camera. His chief interest was in airplane photography, to which field he contributed the "Bagley five lens camera." He retired as Lieutenant Colonel in 1936, and in the following year became a Lecturer at the Institute of Geographical Exploration. His famous textbook, Aerophotography and Aereosurveying, was written here."

After the war, he was placed in charge of an Engineer unit at Wright Field, Ohio, to further develop aerial photography for military applications, and to produce a nucleus of expert photogrammetrists. During this time, Major Bagley produced a five lens camera, the T-3A, which could be used by topographers who already knew the distance between any two points, to then compute the remaining measurements and prepare a two-dimensional or planimetric map. This camera saw extensive use during World War II.

"Freedom from dependence upon ground surveys was forecast during World War I, when Major James W. Bagley, a former civilian employee of the US Geological Survey and a pioneer in American photo-mapping, brought his recently invented tri-lens camera to France. Bagley's camera took one vertical and two oblique photographs and in that way produced a much larger picture than a single lens camera previously used. Study of these photographs enabled topographic engineers to overprint the site of enemy trenches and gun emplacements on existing base maps."

The use of the T-3A cameras, when mounted side by side, produced a field of about 400 square miles. From the provisional maps prepared from the planimetric maps, multiplex operators determined elevations and filled in contours by stereocomparagraph. This technique allowed an Army topographic battalion to produce maps of over 100 square miles of contour maps a day, a vital improvement in marking and targeting the modern battlefield.

"In 1918, Major James W. Bagley (a USGS employee prior to U.S. entry into the war) was assigned to the European theatre to conduct field tests with an experimental three-lensaerial camera (Air Service History, Vol. 13, p. 58.) Bagley's earlier USGS work applied photogrammetric principals to topographic mapping using terrestrial photography, and outlined applications of his techniques to aerial photography (Bagley, 1917). Although Bagley's team arrived in Europe too late to complete the planned trials under wartime conditions, the camera was evaluated after the Armistice to photograph sectors of the St-Mihel and Meuse-Argonne battlefields to assess its effectiveness for military reconnaissance. Bagley's design was judged to be effective, although opinion favored the use of a longer focal length camera for military use (Air Service History, Vol. 13, p. 65). After the war, the Bagley design became a key component of civil aerial survey.

== Wright Field ==
"Soon after the Armistice, Bagley was placed in charge of a small Engineer detachment at Wright Field (then McCook Field) to work with the US Army Air Service in applying aerial photography to military mapping. Although the Wright Field detachment seldom exceeded two officers, six enlisted men and a few civilians, it gradually provided a nucleus of expert photogrammetrists."

Some of the archives from his time in Wright Field are kept by the National Air and Space Museum of the Smithsonian Institution. Their description of their holdings records say: "The U.S. Army began aerial photography after World War I to free them from the time consuming and costly survey parties. Major James W. Bagley was placed in charge of the small engineer detachment at Wright Field to supply aerial photography for military mapping. The experiments of this time period produced methods of aerial mapping that opened up vast areas which would have been denied to a ground surveyor during World War II. This collection contains bibliographies, correspondence, reports, articles, pamphlets and drafts of papers on aerial mapping and photography (one authored by Maj. James Bagley). It also contains a dictionary of photographic terms (in German) and material on various cameras and other equipment including Adam Hilger Ltd.'s Survey Stereoscope; Fairchild's Solar Navigator; Brigg's Gyroscope Vertical Indicator; J.G. Saltzman, Inc.'s, lighting and enlarging equipment; Messter Topograph; the Nistri Photocartograph and the Santoni Photogrammetric method (in both English and Italian); and the aerocartograph (blue prints and quadrangle mapping)."

Major Bagley was appointed battalion commander of the 29th Engineers in 1923 and was director of the United States Lake Survey with its headquarters in Detroit, Michigan. He was then made chief of the military intelligence section of the Office of the Chief of Engineers. In 1936 he was advanced to Lieutenant Colonel and retired in the same year.

He was a commander of the 29th Engineers Topographic Battalion from 1928 until his retirement in 1936. In 1937 he became a lecturer at Harvard University, and wrote several articles and a book.

In an article published by Harvard University, Major Bagley commented on his research: ""An aerial photography unit has a two-fold purpose in an Air Corps during military operations. First, it supplies military maps of enemy territory and, second, furnishes detailed information concerning the movement of enemy troops and equipment," Major Bagley continued, "and such units were found of tremendous value during the War. Since the War, the developments in aerial photography have been, for the most part, along the lines of improved mapping cameras to give accurate results which can furnish pictures with more detail and correctness. In the field of gathering information concerning troop movements, the aim has been to spot them with greater speed and accuracy. For this purpose larger cameras have been constructed to keep pace with improved aircraft which have a higher ceiling, and since more and more efficient planes are being constructed, photography must not fall behind. One of the most important developments has been in connection with night work, and, a remarkable speed in developing and printing pictures has been attained, to complete the process of photography."

== Tributes ==
Dr. Erwin Raisz said of him that he was "[a] gentleman by tradition, a scientist by education and an inventor by nature."."

The Bagley Icefield in southeastern Alaska in named for Major James W. Bagley.

In 2007, the Army Geospatial Center added a plaque in his honor on the "Topographic Engineer Wall of Fame" at their headquarters in Ft. Belvoir, VA.

== Personal life ==
Bagley married Agnes Stevens in 1911. They had three children: Samuel, Charles and Lucy. The Bagleys had four grandchildren at the time of his death. "In 1911 James Warren Bagley married Agnes Stevens, who has been a most charming and loyal companion all through life. Three children also survive him: Samuel Stevens, who is on the family estate; Charles Thomas, a member of the faculty of the University of Tennessee; and Lucy Warren, a U.S. Department of Agriculture Extension Service employee and later a farmer in Vermont. There are four grandchildren."

Incidentally, Bagley tried to name a mountain in Alaska after his wife. Mount Marcus Baker was originally called "Mount Saint Agnes"; according to Bradford Washburn, James W. Bagley of the USGS named it after his wife Agnes, adding the "Saint" in hopes of making the name stick. The name was later changed to honor a cartographer and geologist named Marcus Baker.

== Bibliography ==
- Bagley, James Warren. 1941. Aerophotography and aerosurveying. New York: McGraw-Hill Book Co. OCLC: 938332.
- Talley, B. B. (1935). Mapping by the use of aerial photographs [with discussion by majors charles H. cunningham and james W. bagley]. The Military Engineer, 27(155), 357-361.
- Concerning Aerial Photographic Mapping: A Review: La topographie moderne et les applications de la photographie aux leves topographiques by H. Noirel; Experiments in Aeroplane Photo Surveying by C. G. Lewis; H. G. Salmond; Mapping from Air Photographs by M. N. Macleod; Applications de la photographie aerienne aux leves topographiques de precision by H. Roussilhe; Rapport sur les etudes techniques effectuees in 1919 et 1920 by H. Roussilhe; The Use of Aerial Photographs in Topographic Mapping by H. Roussilhe. Review by: James W. Bagley. Geographical Review, Vol. 12, No. 4 (Oct., 1922), pp. 628–635. American Geographical Society. Article Stable URL: https://www.jstor.org/stable/208595.
- Bagley, J.W. "Topographic Surveying from the Air" Military Engineer. Nov.–Dec. 1923
- Bagley, J.W. "Stereophotography in Aerial Mapping" Military Engineer. May–June 1924
- Bagley, J.W. "Study of Searchlight Triangulation" Military Engineer. July–Aug. 1926
- Bagley, J.W. "Surveying with the Five-Lens Camera" Military Engineer. Mar.–Apr. 1932
- Bagley, J.W. "The Tri-Lens Camera in Aerial Photography and Photographic Mapping. Discussions". The Military Engineer. May–June, 1920.
- Bagley, James Warren. 1917. The use of the panoramic camera in topographic surveying: with notes on the application of photogrammetry to aerial surveys. US Geological survey Bulletin #657. Washington: Government Printing Office.
- Geological Survey (U.S.), James Warren Bagley, and C. E. Giffin. 1915. Alaska, Prince William Sound region, Port Valdez District. [Washington, D.C.?]: The Survey. Relief shown by contours and spot heights. Title, upper center margin: Topography. "Alaska Sheet no. 602 B." "Entire area within Chugach National Forest." "Control by Coast and Geodetic Survey. Surveyed in 1911 and 1912." Includes index to the mines and prospects in the area and location map. OCLC: 11830033.
- Geological Survey (U.S.), James Warren Bagley, and Alfred Hulse Brooks. 1915. Topographic map of Moose Pass and vicinity, Kenai Peninsula, Alaska. [Washington]: U.S. Geological Survey.
- Geological Survey (U.S.), James Warren Bagley, R. H. Sargent, and C. E. Griffin. 1930. Valdez and vicinity. [Washington, D.C.?]: The Survey.
- Bagley, James Warren. 1939. Topographic reconnaissance map of the Chitina Valley and adjacent areas: Alaska. [Washington, D.C.]: U.S.G.S.
- Geological Survey (U.S.), and James Warren Bagley. 1924. The Alaska Railroad. [Washington, D.C.]: The Survey.
- Bagley, James Warren, Gerard Hendrick Matthes, Joseph Henry Wheat, and Harold Chamberlayne Fiske. 1923. Surveys for tactical maps in war.
- Bagley, James Warren, Leo Bond Roberts, and Eric Haquinius. 1923. Topographic surveying from the air.
- Bagley, James Warren, Joseph Henry Wheat, and William Edward Parker. 1920. The tri-lens camera in aerial photography and photographic mapping.
- Bagley, James Warren. 1924. "Stereophotography in aerial mapping." In The Military Engineer. Washington, 1924. 30 cm.Q.vol. xvi, no. 88, p. 303-306 incl. illus. diagrs.
- Bagley, James Warren. 1929. Aerial photographic mapping: map reading and map making. Fort Humphreys, VA: Engineer School.
- Bagley, James Warren. 2000. The use of panoramic camera in topographic surveying: with notes on the application of photogrammetry to aerial surveys. Charleston, SC: Bibliobazaar. Facsim reprint. Originally published: Washington : G. P. O., 1917.
- Capps, Stephen Reid, and James Warren Bagley. 1912. Geologic reconnaissance map of the Bonnifield Region, Alaska. Bulletin (Geological Survey of United States). (501). [Washington, D.C.]: Geological Survey.
- Wilson, Herbert M., Van. H. Manning, James Warren Bagley, and T. H. Moncure. 1908. Mississippi Florence quadrangle. Washington, D.C.: U.S. Geological Survey.
- Judd, P. H., H. F. Johnson, James Warren Bagley, and F. G. Ray. 1930. Lake Michigan deep sea soundings. Survey of the northern and northwestern lakes, sheet no. 1.
- Bagley, James Warren. 1912. Reconnaissance map of the Bonnifield Region, Alaska. Bulletin (Geological Survey of United States). (501). [Washington, D.C.]: Geological Survey.
