= Goode Mountain =

Mountain in Washington (state), United States

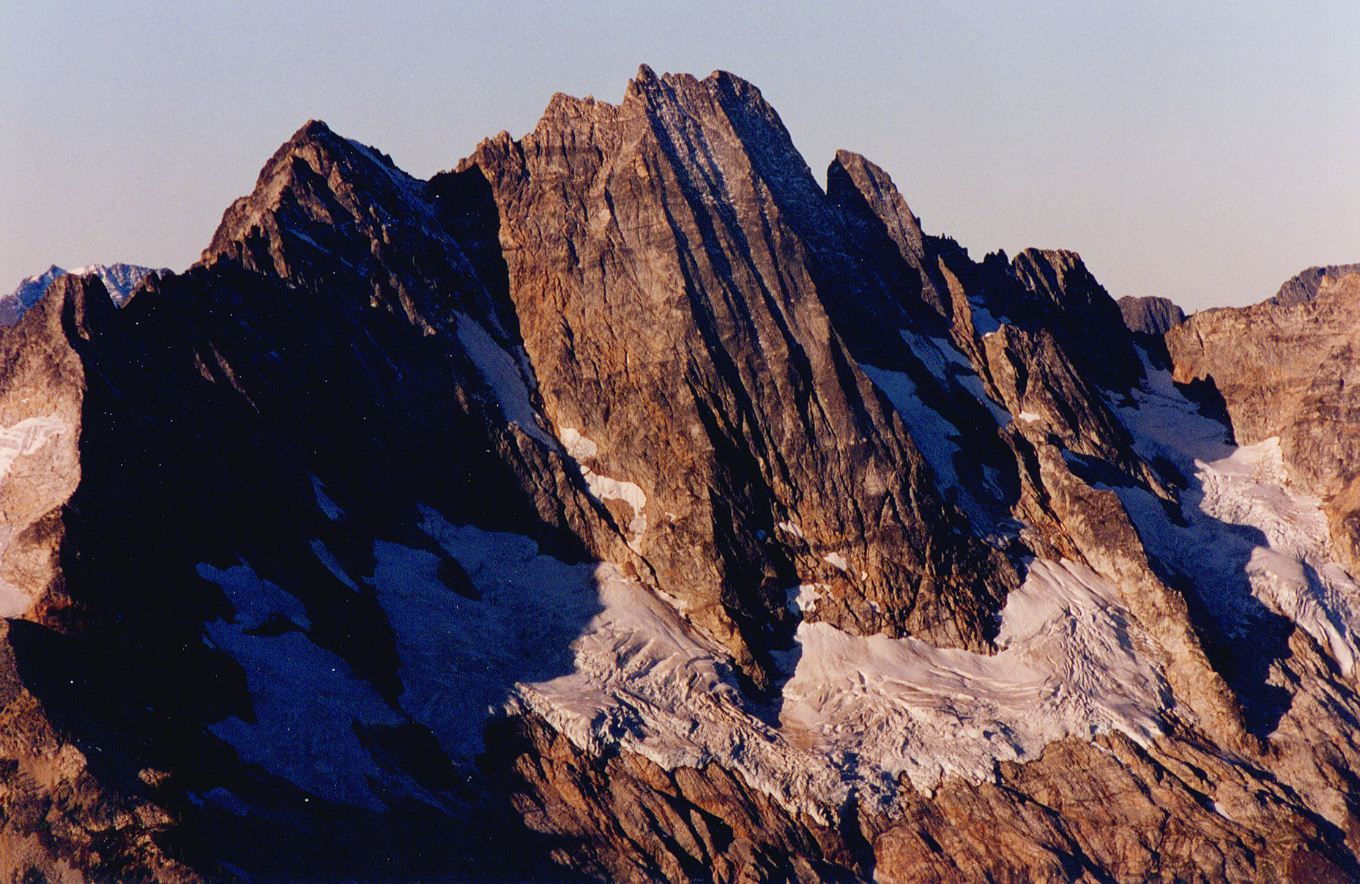
- Goode Mountain

Highest point
- Elevation: 9,220+ ft (2,810+ m)
- Prominence: 3,808 ft (1,161 m)
- Coordinates: 48°28′58″N 120°54′39″W

Naming
- Etymology: Richard Urquhart Goode

Geography
- Location: Chelan County, Washington, U.S.
- Parent range: Cascade Range, North Cascades
- Topo map: USGS Goode Mountain

Climbing
- First ascent: July 5, 1936 by Wolf Bauer, Philip Dickett, Joe Halwax, Jack Hossack, George MacGowan
- Easiest route: Southwest Couloir (Simple climb, with exposure, class 4)

Goode Mountain is one of the major peaks of the North Cascades in the U.S. state of Washington. Named for topographer Richard Urquhart Goode of the United States Geological Survey, it is the highest peak located in North Cascades National Park, between the Skagit River and Lake Chelan. It is the fourth-highest non-volcanic peak in Washington, and the twelfth-highest summit overall.

Goode Mountain is a massive mountain, rising over 6,000 feet (1,800 m) from its footings, and almost 7,000 feet (2,100 m) from the bottom of Bridge creek valley. The mountain is made up of one main peak, and two smaller sub-peaks, The West Tower, and southeast peak. Both are over 8,700 feet (2,700 m). On the northeast side it accomplishes this rise in only 1.6 horizontal miles (2.6 km). However, due to its isolated location in the rugged North Cascades, it is not visible from any major road. Goode Glacier is also located on the northeast slopes of the mountain, in addition to many small snowfields located at higher elevations. Goode Glacier is a hanging glacier and sitting more than 2,800 ft (850 m) below the summit is broken into several sections descending from 7,200 to 5,800 ft (2,200 to 1,800 m). Other major features of the mountain are Greenview Lake elevation 5,455 feet (1,700 m), Memaloose Ridge over 7,200 feet (2,200 m), and Goode Ridge 7,640 feet (2,300 m).

The mountain was first climbed in 1936 via the Southwest Couloir/Southeast Ridge Route, which is still the least technical route. More popular now is the Northeast Buttress, pioneered by well-known climber Fred Beckey and Tom Stewart on August 6, 1966. It involves some snow, possible ice, and rock climbing up to class 5.5. One of the most impressive routes is The Megalodon Ridge first ascent was September 6, 2007 by Blake Herrington and Sol Wertkin. A IV+ 5.10 route, along a ridge over 5,000 feet (1,500 m) feet long, which took 12 hours to ascend by Blake Herrington and Sol Werkin. The route has 4,000 to 5,000 feet (1,200 to 1,500 m) of exposure, it's considered one of the toughest established routes on the mountain.

== Routes ==
- Southwest Couloir/Southeast Ridge: first ascent July 5, 1936 by Wolf Bauer, Othello Philip (Phil) Dickert, Joe Halwax, Jack Hossack, George MacGowan
- Northeast Buttress IV 5.5: first ascent August 6, 1966 by Fred Beckey and Tom Stewart.
- Megalodon Ridge IV+ 5.10: first ascent September 6, 2007 by Blake Herrington and Sol Wertkin

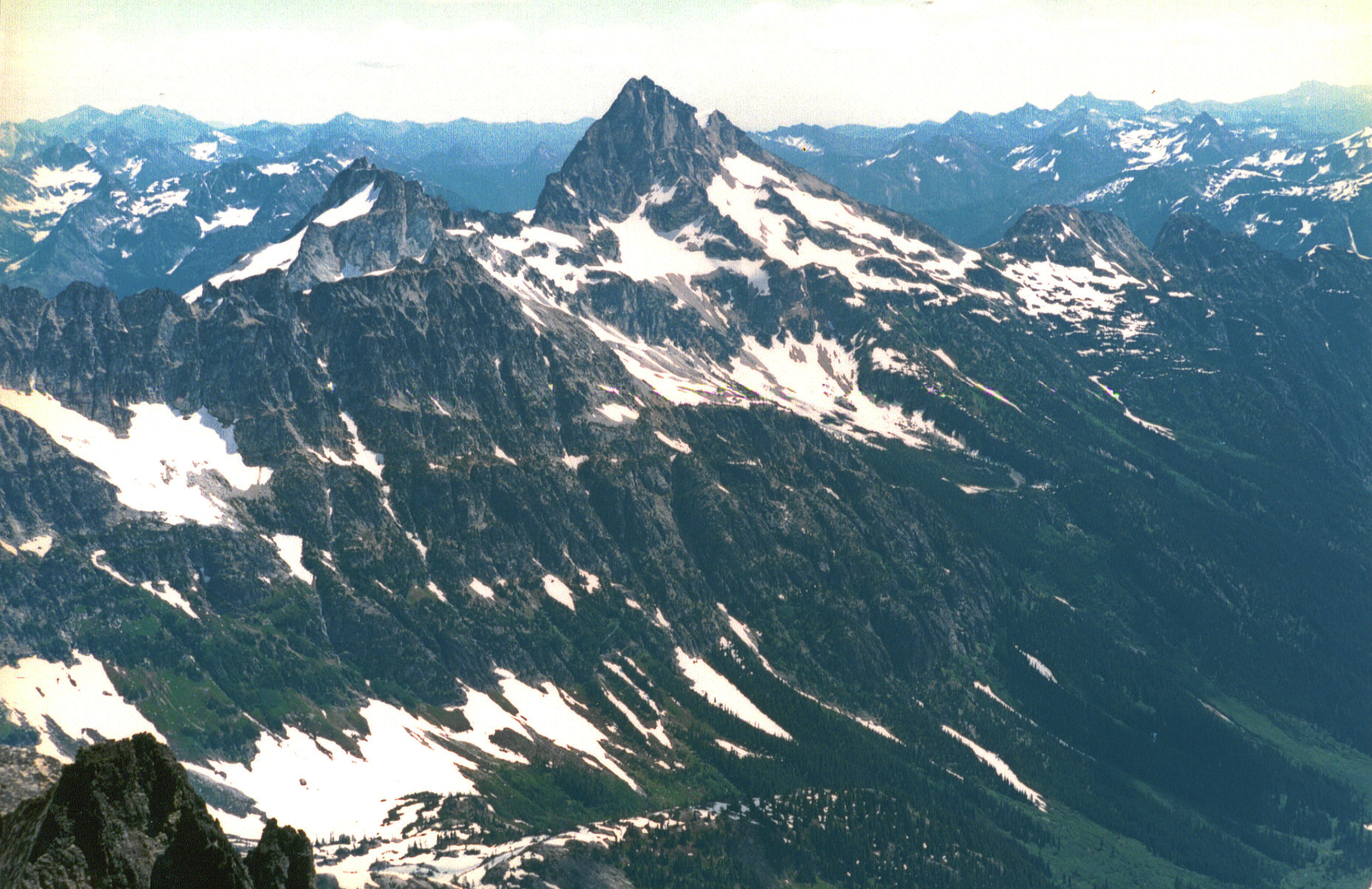
Goode seen from Buckner

== See also ==
- List of highest mountain peaks in Washington
