= Hearth Mountain =

Mountain in Alaska, United States

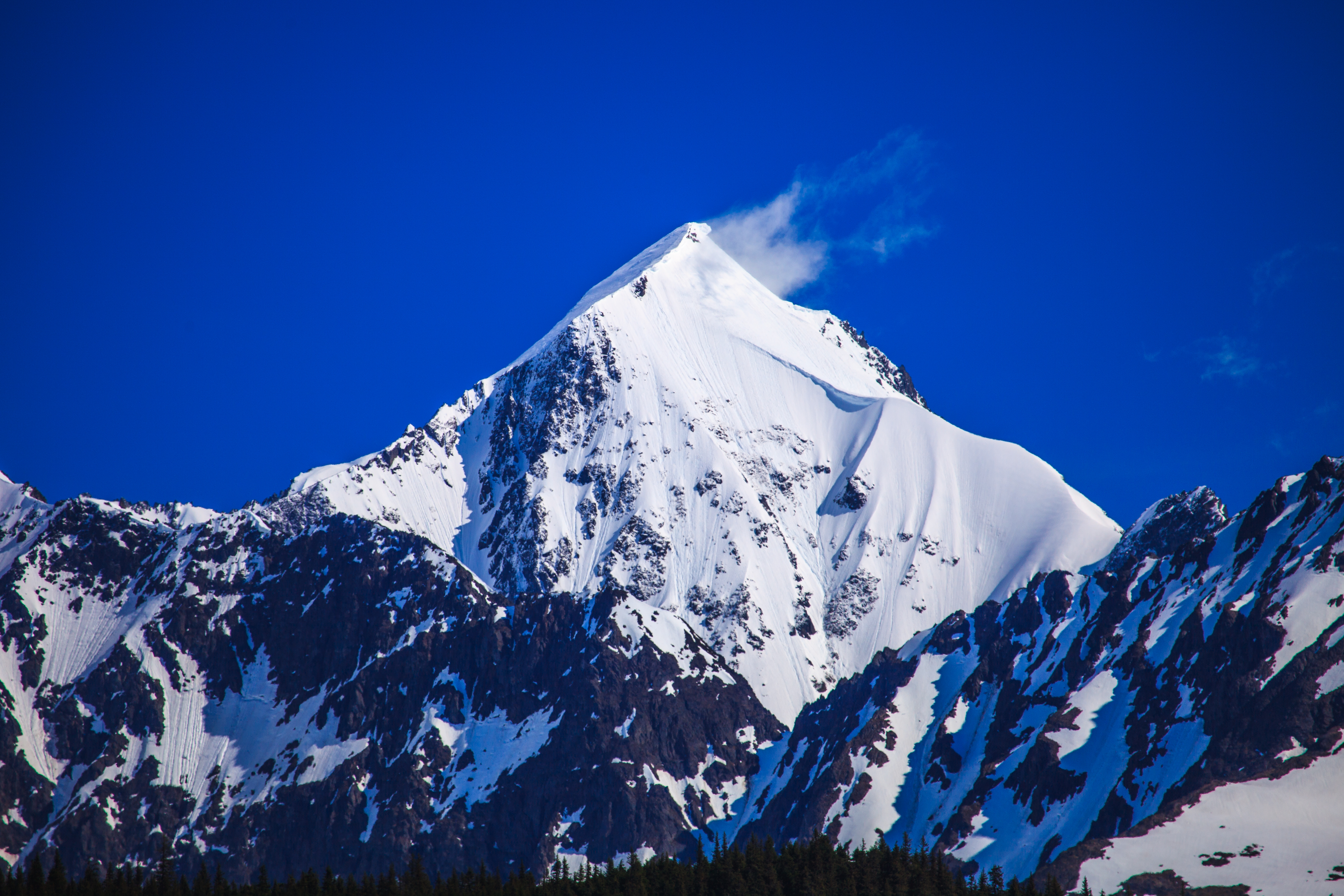
- North aspect

Highest point
- Elevation: 6,182 ft (1,884 m)
- Prominence: 3,482 ft (1,061 m)
- Isolation: 7.64 mi (12.30 km)
- Coordinates: 60°13′52″N 149°11′21″W

Geography
- Location within Alaska
- Interactive map of Hearth Mountain
- Country: United States
- State: Alaska
- Borough: Kenai Peninsula
- Protected area: Chugach National Forest
- Parent range: Kenai Mountains
- Topo map: USGS Seward A-6

Hearth Mountain is a 6,182-foot-elevation (1,884-meter) mountain summit in Alaska, United States.

== Description ==
Hearth Mountain is located 12 miles (19 km) northeast of Seward in the Kenai Mountains, on land managed by Chugach National Forest. Precipitation runoff and glacial meltwater from the mountain's slopes drains to Kenai Lake via the Snow River. Although modest in elevation, topographic relief is significant as the summit rises 5,380 feet (1,640 m) above the South Fork Snow River in 2 miles (3.2 km). The mountain is visible from the Seward Highway. The mountain's name "hearth" was applied by mountaineer Vin Hoeman in the 1960s and follows a "fireplace" naming theme for landforms in the immediate area. Other fireplace-related landforms nearby include Kindling Mountain, North Andiron, Fireside Glacier, and Hearth Glacier. The mountain's toponym has not been officially adopted by the United States Board on Geographic Names.

== Climate ==
Based on the Köppen climate classification, Hearth Mountain is located in a tundra climate zone with long, cold, snowy winters, and mild summers. Weather systems coming off the Gulf of Alaska are forced upwards by the Kenai Mountains (orographic lift), causing heavy precipitation in the form of rainfall and snowfall. Winter temperatures can drop below 0 °F with wind chill factors below −10 °F. This climate supports several glaciers on the peak's slopes, two of which are unofficially named Fireside Glacier and Hearth Glacier.

== Gallery ==
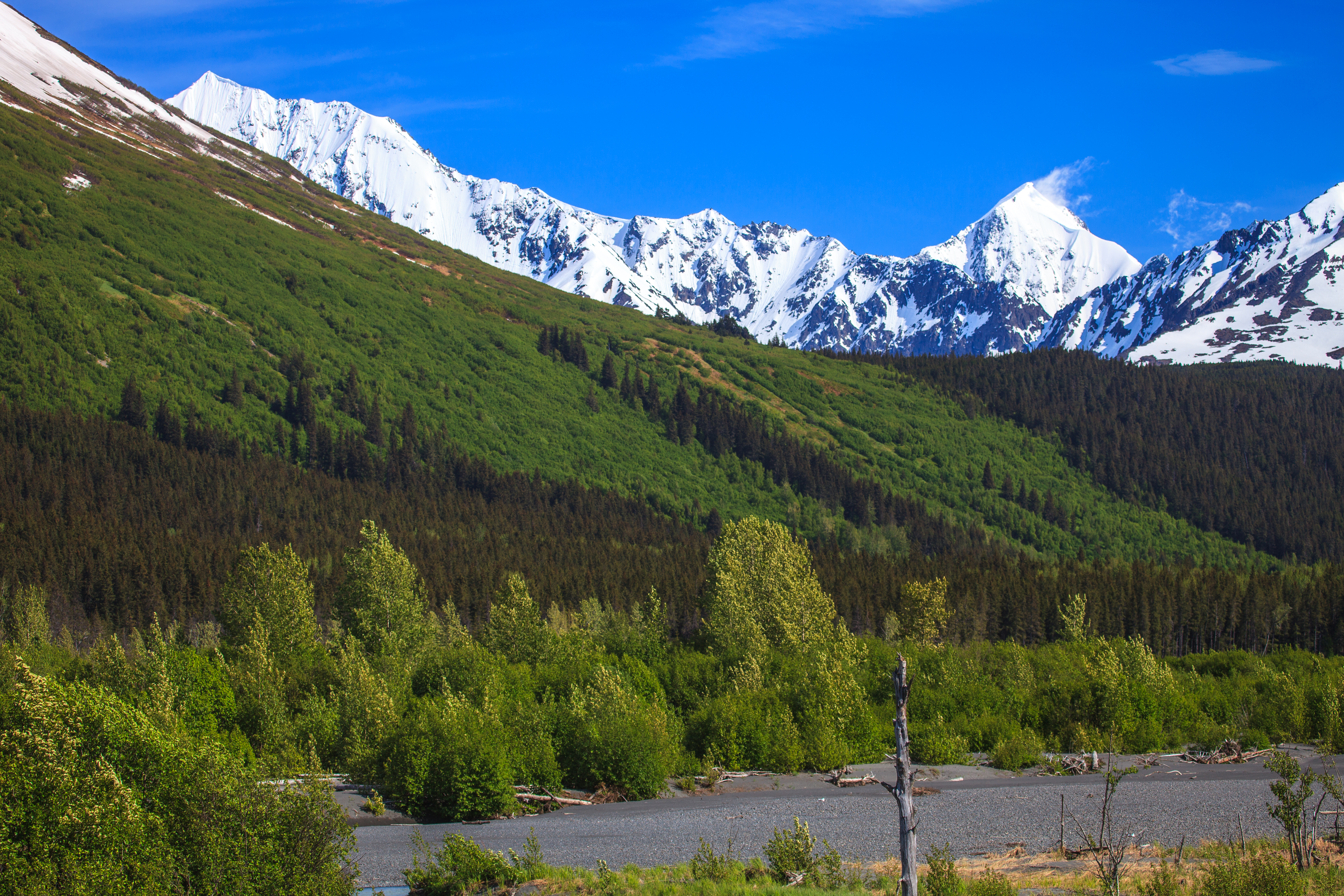
Paradise Peak (L), Hearth Mountain (R)

== See also ==
- List of mountain peaks of Alaska
- Geography of Alaska
