= Peril Peak (Alaska) =

Mountain in Alaska, United States

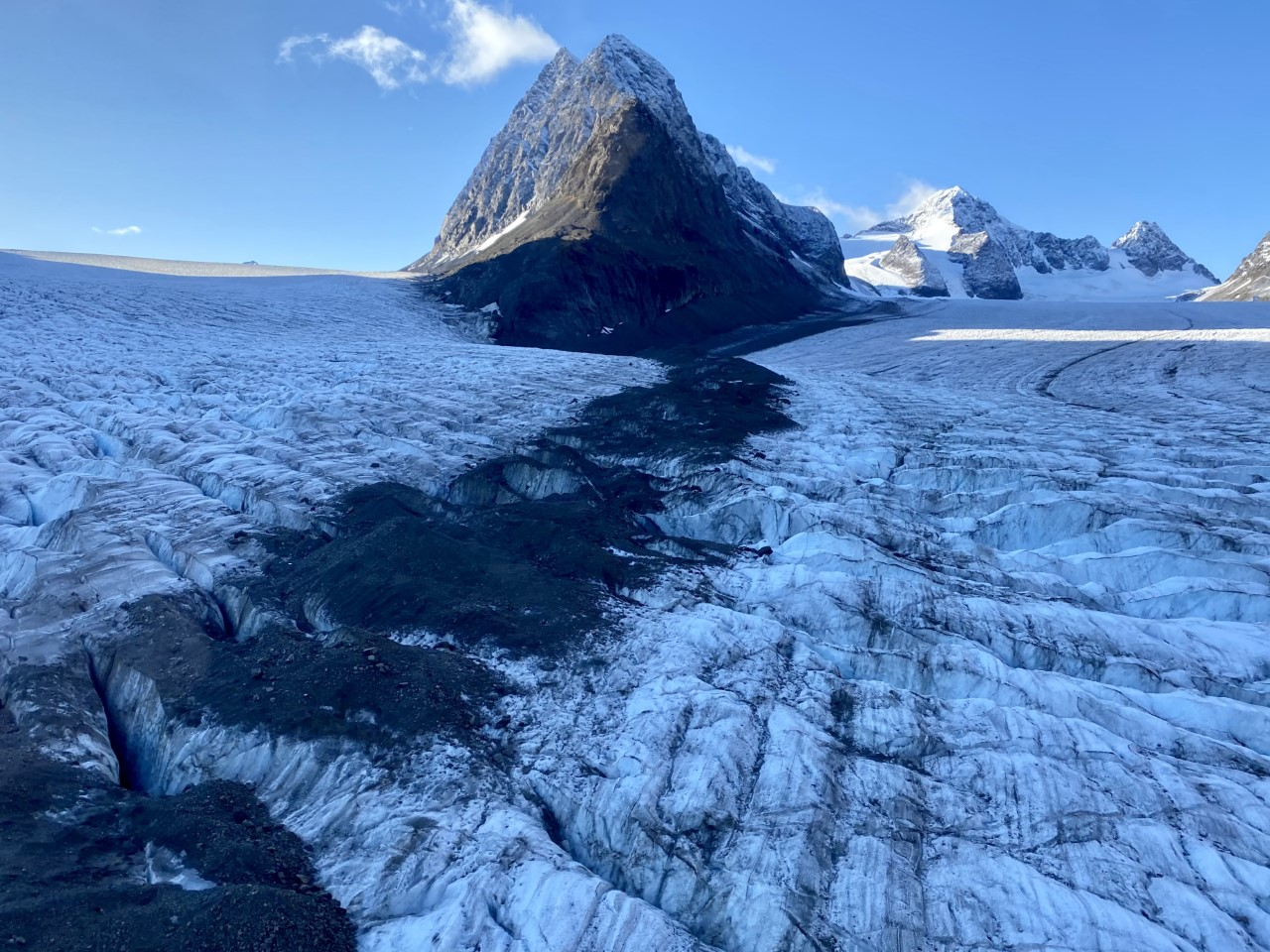
- North aspect centered above Eklutna Glacier (Mt. Beelzebub to right)

Highest point
- Elevation: 7,040 ft (2,146 m)
- Prominence: 1,214 ft (370 m)
- Parent peak: Mount Beelzebub (7,280 ft)
- Isolation: 2.15 mi (3.46 km)
- Coordinates: 61°12′57″N 148°59′11″W

Geography
- Location within Alaska
- Interactive map of Peril Peak
- Country: United States
- State: Alaska
- Borough: Anchorage
- Protected area: Chugach State Park
- Parent range: Chugach Mountains
- Topo map: USGS Anchorage A-6

Climbing
- First ascent: 1964

Peril Peak is a 7,040-foot (2,146 m) mountain summit in Alaska, United States.

== Description ==
Peril Peak is located 30 miles (48 km) east of Anchorage in the western Chugach Mountains. It ranks as the 14th-highest summit within Chugach State Park. Precipitation runoff from the mountain drains to Knik Arm via the Eklutna River. Although modest in elevation, topographic relief is significant as the summit rises 2,500 feet (762 m) above the Eklutna Glacier in 0.25 mi (0.40 km).

== History ==
The peak was so named in 1963 by the members of the Mountaineering Club of Alaska because of the danger and difficulty involved in climbing it. The mountain's toponym was officially adopted in 1964 by the United States Board on Geographic Names. "Jane Russell Peaks" and "Marilyns Twins" were names rejected by the board, as the landform appears to have twin summits when viewed from the north.

The first ascent of the summit was made on May 23, 1964, by Gregg Erickson, Helga Bading, Jim Frazer, and Hans Van der Laan, from the south.

== Climate ==
Based on the Köppen climate classification, Peril Peak is located in a tundra climate zone with long, cold, snowy winters, and cool summers. Weather systems coming off the Gulf of Alaska are forced upwards by the Chugach Mountains (orographic lift), causing heavy precipitation in the form of rainfall and snowfall. Winter temperatures can drop below −10 °F with wind chill factors below −20 °F. This climate supports the Eklutna Glacier surrounding the peak.

== See also ==
- List of mountain peaks of Alaska
- Geography of Alaska
