= Tiehacker Mountain =

Mountain in Alaska, United States

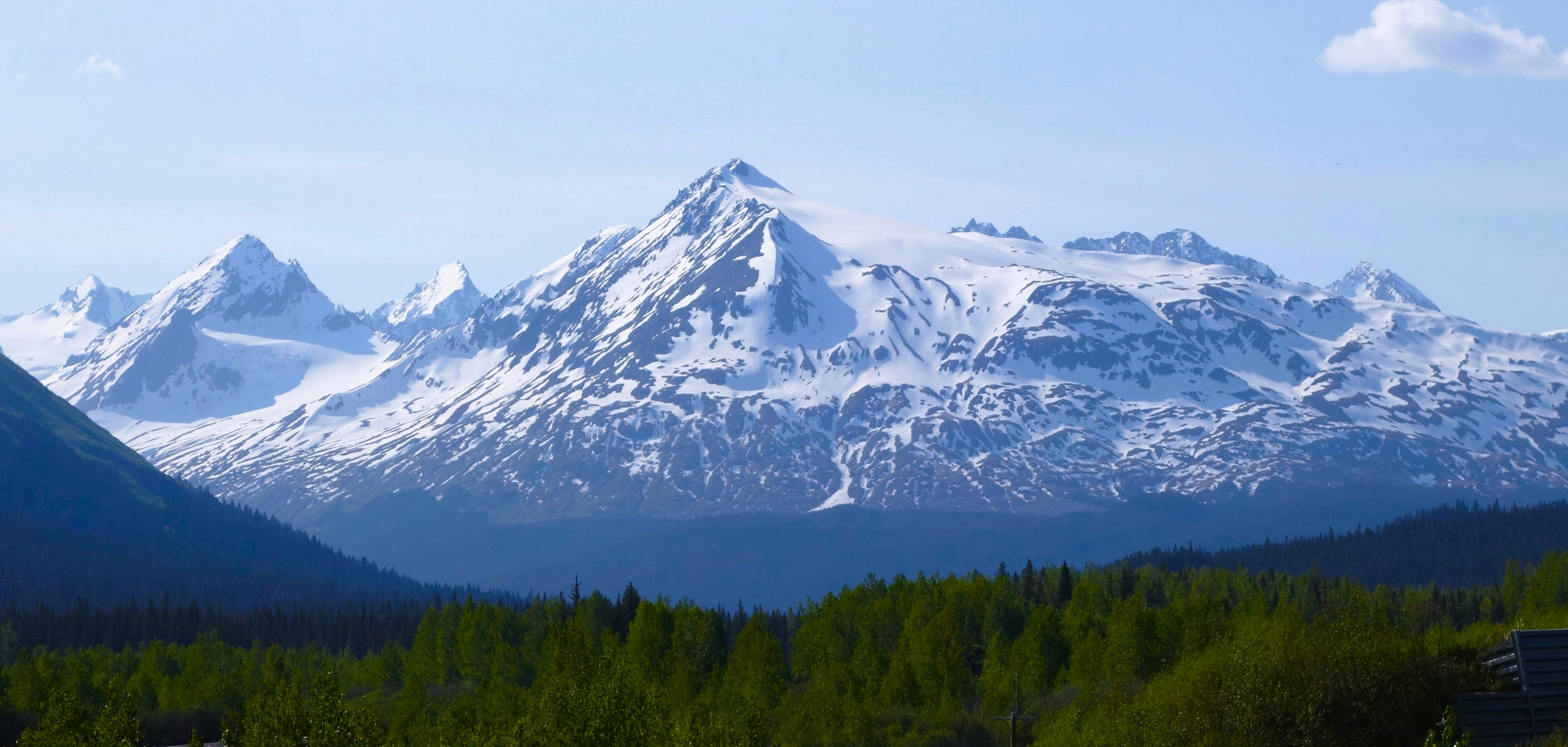
- North aspect

Highest point
- Elevation: 4,435 ft (1,352 m)
- Prominence: 885 ft (270 m)
- Isolation: 1.89 mi (3.04 km)
- Coordinates: 60°11′44″N 149°16′36″W

Naming
- Etymology: Tiehacker

Geography
- Location within Alaska
- Interactive map of Tiehacker Mountain
- Country: United States
- State: Alaska
- Borough: Kenai Peninsula
- Protected area: Chugach National Forest
- Parent range: Kenai Mountains
- Topo map: USGS Seward A-7

Climbing
- Easiest route: Scrambling

Tiehacker Mountain is a 4,435-foot-elevation (1,352-meter) mountain summit in Alaska, United States.

== Description ==
Tiehacker Mountain is located seven miles (11 km) northeast of Seward in the Kenai Mountains, on land managed by Chugach National Forest. Precipitation runoff and glacial meltwater from the mountain's south and west slopes drains to Resurrection Bay via Salmon Creek, whereas the north and east slopes drain to Kenai Lake via the South Fork Snow River. Although modest in elevation, topographic relief is significant as the summit rises over 3,600 feet (1,097 m) above the South Fork in 1.3 miles (2.1 km). The mountain's toponym was officially adopted in 2002, by the United States Board on Geographic Names. The mountain's toponym "tiehacker" is a nickname for lumberjacks who fashioned railroad ties from trees as a source of winter income during the construction of the Alaska Railroad in the early 1900s. The rail line passes three miles to the west of the peak, being separated by Bear Lake, and the trees were harvested from Tiehacker Mountain. The Iditarod National Historic Trail traverses the western base of the mountain and the mountain is visible from the Seward Highway.

== Climate ==
Based on the Köppen climate classification, Tiehacker Mountain is located in a tundra climate zone with long, cold, snowy winters, and mild summers. Weather systems coming off the Gulf of Alaska are forced upwards by the Kenai Mountains (orographic lift), causing heavy precipitation in the form of rainfall and snowfall. Winter temperatures can drop below 0 °F with wind chill factors below −10 °F. This climate supports the Bear Lake Glacier on the south slope and a small unnamed glacier on the northwest slope.

== Gallery ==
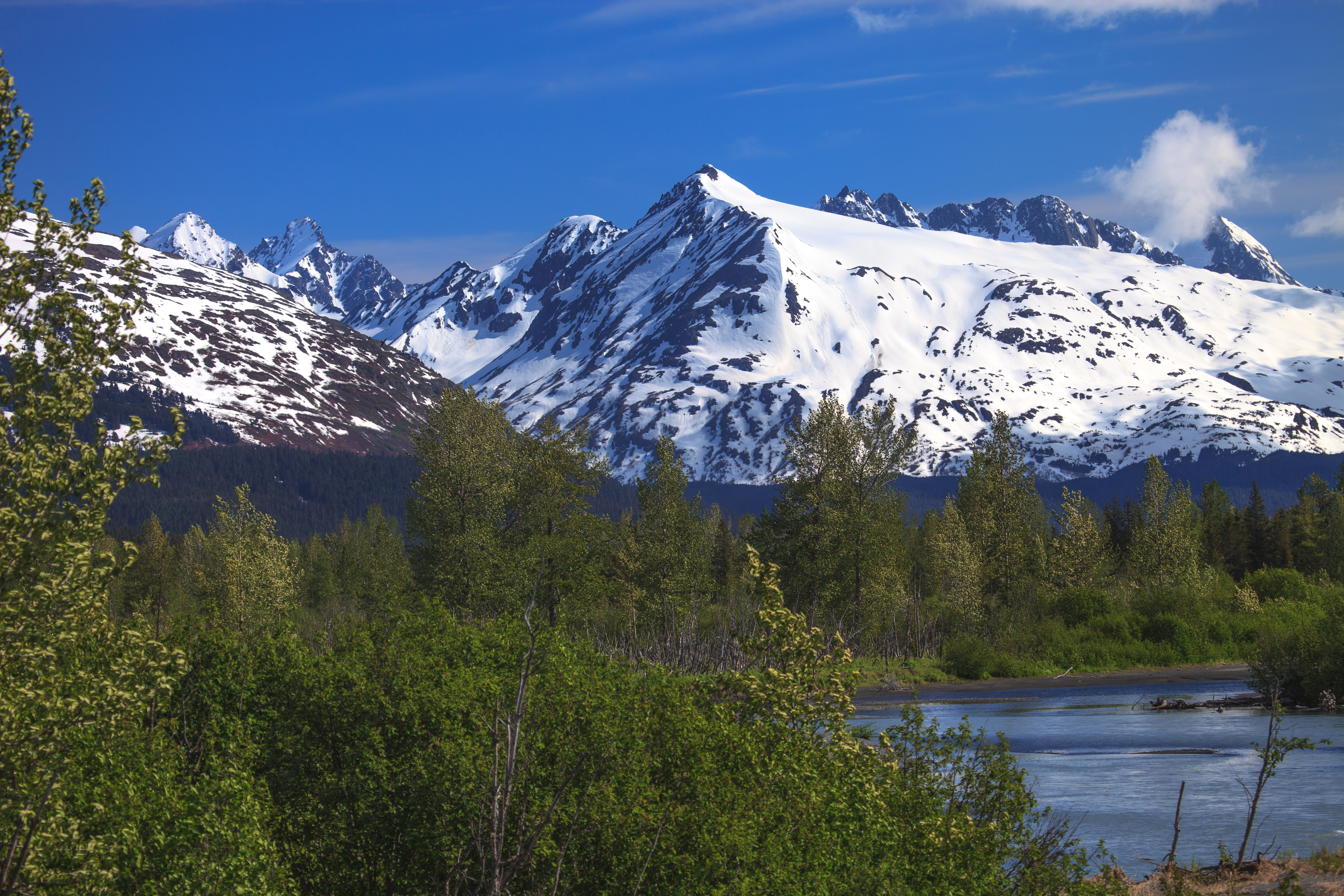
North aspect

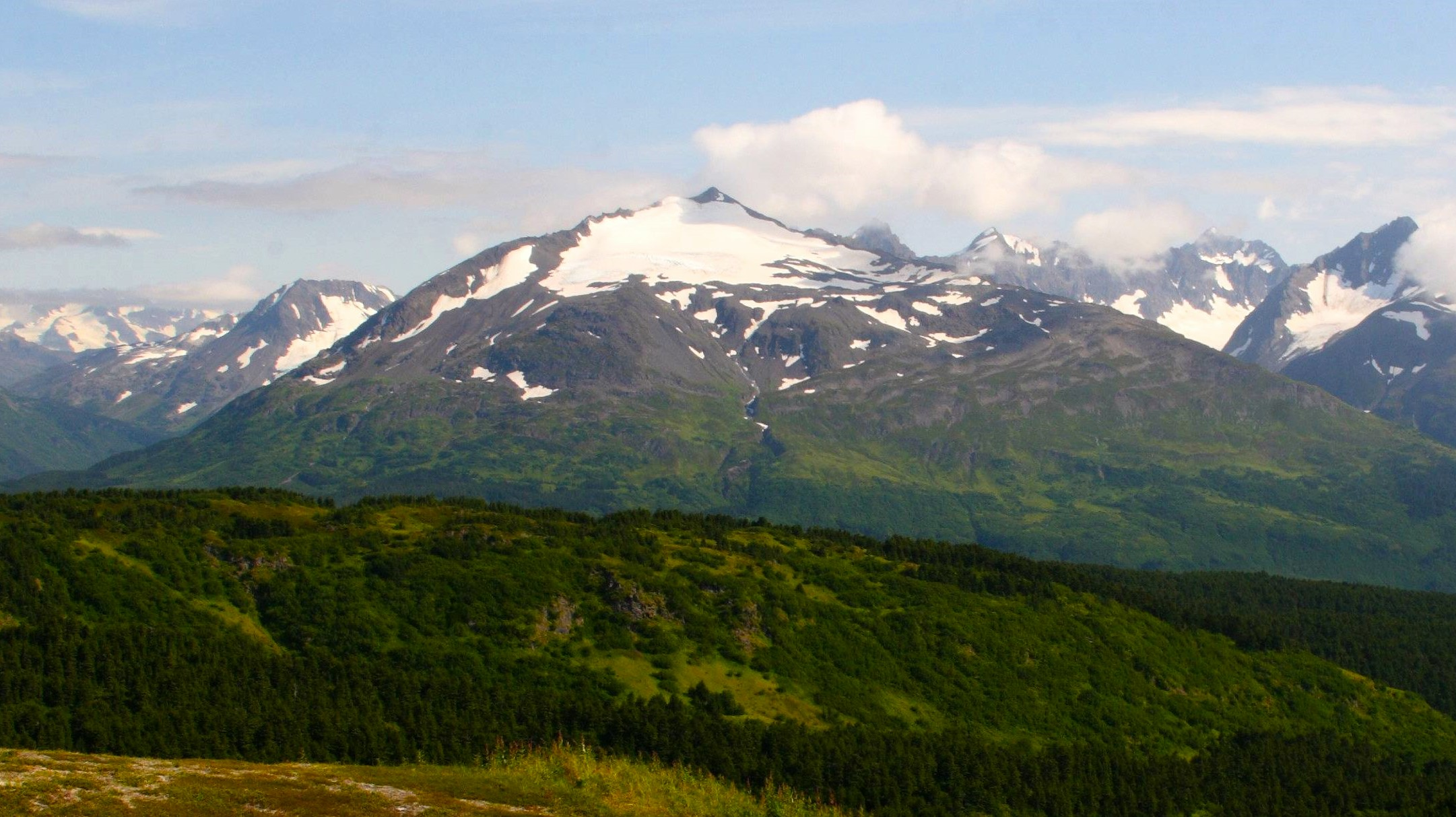
West aspect

== See also ==
- List of mountain peaks of Alaska
- Geography of Alaska
