= Richard Urquhart Goode =

American geographer (1858–1903)

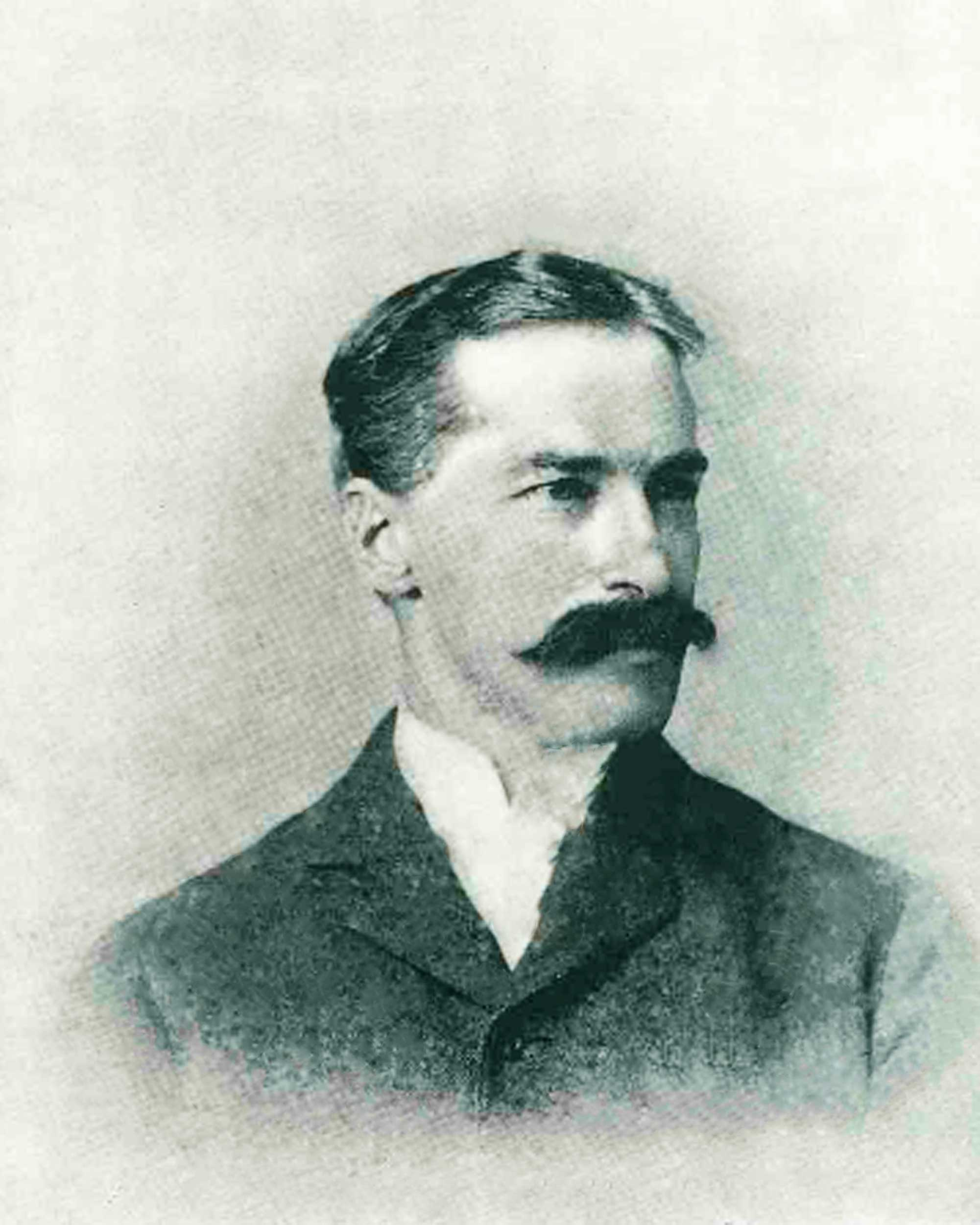
- Richard U. Goode, shortly before his death
- Born: December 8, 1858; Bedford, Virginia, U.S.
- Died: June 9, 1903 (aged 44); Rockville, Maryland, U.S.
- Burial place: Rock Creek Cemetery
- Monuments: Mount Goode, California; Goode Mountain, Washington; Goode Glacier, Washington; Mount Goode, Alaska
- Education: University of Virginia
- Occupation: Geographer
- Employer: United States Geological Survey
- Organization(s): Cosmos Club; National Geographic Society; Washington Academy of Sciences
- Known for: USGS Topographic Maps; Panama Canal Survey; Northern Transcontinental Railroad Survey

Richard Urquhart Goode (December 8, 1858 – June 9, 1903) was an American geographer and topographer with the United States Geological Survey (USGS) Northern Transcontinental Railroad Survey, and the Panama Canal Company. Goode was in charge of the Western Division of the USGS. which included all lands west of the Mississippi River, and worked on the boundary between the United States and Canada.

Goode was one of the first employees of the newly created USGS in 1879. As a USGS topographer, he conducted geographic surveys of unmapped areas of the United States, resulting in what are now called USGS Topographic Maps. Goode is credited with the triangulation for more than 100 topographic maps; the data that he collected is still in use on current USGS maps. In 1894, Goode was placed in charge of the USGS Pacific Section and became head of the Western Division in June 1903.

Goode temporarily left the USGS to work on two nationally important projects. From 1882 to 1884, he was a topographer for the Northern Transcontinental Railroad Survey in Montana and Washington. In 1888, Goode was an engineer and astronomer for the Panama Canal Company, conducting topographic surveys that addressed property rights on the Isthmus of Darian (now called the Isthmus of Panama).

Goode was a member of the National Geographic Society and wrote several articles for National Geographic. He is the namesake of Mount Goode in Alaska, Goode Glacier in Washington, Mount Goode in Kings Canyon National Park of California, and Goode Mountain in North Cascades National Park.

== Early life ==
Goode was born in Bedford, Virginia, on December 8, 1858. He was the son of Sarah "Sallie" (née Urquhart) and John Goode Jr., a Virginia lawyer, politician and Solicitor General of the United States under President Grover Cleveland. His mother was the daughter of a wealthy planter, Dr. Richard Alexander Urquhart of Strawberry Plains plantation in Isle of Wight County, Virginia. Goode's siblings were Mary Urquhart Goode (1856–1926), John Breckinridge Goode (1864–1917), Annie Walton Goode (1869–1871), and James Urquhart Goode (1873–1944). According to the 1860 United States census, his father enslaved seven individuals.

Goode attended the Hanover Academy in Norfolk, Virginia, and the Norfolk Military Academy also in Norfolk, with his cousin Frank Urquhart. Later, he attended the University of Virginia for several terms where he studied geography. He graduated from the university in 1878.

== Career ==
Goode served as an assistant in the Army's Engineer Corps (now U.S. Army Corps of Engineers) from 1877 to 1878. In 1879, Goode received an appointment from the U.S. Secretary of the Interior to be a topographer with the newly created United States Geological Survey (USGS). He was assigned to conduct geographic surveys in Arizona and Utah, resulting in what are now called the USGS Topographic Maps. In 1880, he was promoted to supervisor, charged with a survey of the Colorado Plateau. In 1881, he was assigned to oversee the primary triangulation of the area near Fort Wingate in New Mexico.

On May 1, 1882, Goode temporarily resigned from the USGS to be a topographer for the Northern Transcontinental Railroad Survey (also called the Northern Pacific Topographical and Scientific Survey), working in Montana and Washington from 1882 to 1884. On July 23, 1884, Goode rejoined the USGS and supervised surveys in Kansas and Missouri. In 1886, he supervised surveys in Texas, working alongside another team supervised by his cousin Charles Fox Urquhart. In May and June 1888, Goode and Urquhart did the triangulation for Rhode Island, for a collaborative mapping project between the state and the USGS.

Later in 1888, Goode took another leave of absence from the USGS—this time as an engineer and astronomer to conduct important topographic surveys addressing property rights on the Isthmus of Darian (now called the Isthmus of Panama) for the Panama Canal Company.

In 1889, Goode rejoined the USGS and was promoted to the position of geographer in charge of the Southern Central Division of Topography. In September 1890, the USGS restructured its Topographic Branch into two divisions—Eastern and Western—and Goode was placed in charge of the Kansas-Texas section of Western Division. In August 1894, Goode was placed in charge of the more important Pacific Section, including California, Oregon, Arizona, Colorado, Nevada, Washington and Alaska.

Goode worked on the boundary between the United States and Canada in 1898. In 1898, he spoke about "The Bitterroot Forest Preserve," now the Bitterroot National Forest, at a meeting of the National Geographic Society (NGS) at the Columbian University (later George Washington University). In 1900, Goode presented a lecture, "The Topographic Work of the United States Geological Survey," at the California Academy of Sciences.

In June 1903, Goode was placed in charge of the Western Division of the USGS which included all lands west of the Mississippi River. His offices were in Washington, D.C., requiring Goode to return to the East Coast when it was not the summer mapping season. Goode oversaw the Western Division until he died in 1903.

== Professional affiliations ==
Goode was a member of the Washington Academy of Sciences, the NGS, and the Cosmos Club, where he was also an officer. From 1901 to 1903, he was the chairman of the Committee on Technical Meetings at the NGS.

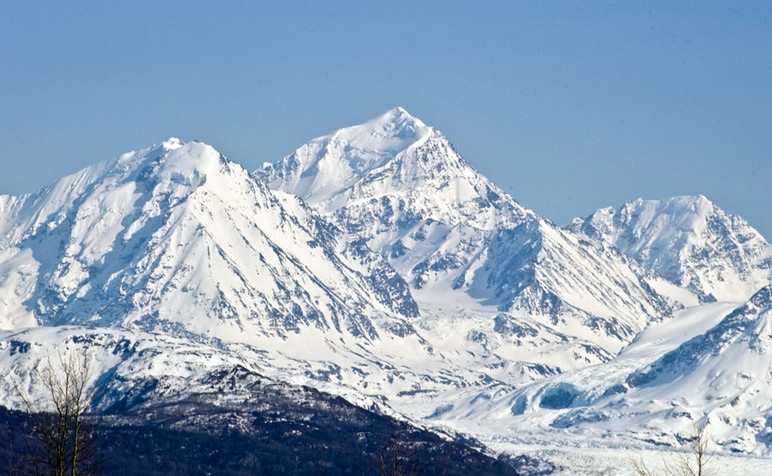
Mount Goode, Alaska

== Honors ==
Several geographical features were named in his honor:

- Mount Goode, a 10,610-foot (3,230 m) summit located in the Chugach Mountains of Alaska was named after him in 1924.
- Goode Mountain, the highest peak in North Cascades National Park and fourth highest in Chelan County, Washington—which Goode surveyed in 1883.
- Goode Glacier, rises over 1 mile (1.6 km) vertically above the North Fork Bridge Creek valley floor on the northeast face of Goode Mountain, Northern Cascades National Park.
- Mount Goode, a 13,085-foot (3,988 m) summit on the crest of the Sierra Nevada in Kings Canyon National Park of California, officially named in 1926.

== Personal ==
On January 2, 1889, Goode married Sophie Jackson Parks (born November 20, 1860) of Norfolk, Virginia, in Saint Paul's Episcopal Church. Parks was the daughter of Marshall Ott Parks—Commodore in the Confederate Navy, member of the Virginia legislature, a hotelier, railroad man, president of the Dismal Swamp Canal Company, and Supervising Inspector of Steamboats under President Grover Cleveland.

In 1894, the couple hired architect Victor Mindeleff to design a three-story stone and brick Colonial Revival style house in the Washington, D.C., neighborhood of Lanier Heights. They had three children: Sophie Parks Goode, Sallie Urquhart Goode, and Richard Alexander Goode. In 1898, Goode was elected to the vestry of St. Margaret's Episcopal Church in Washington, D.C.

At the age of 44 years, Goode died unexpectedly of pneumonia at the Woodlawn Hotel in Rockville, Maryland, on June 9, 1903. His funeral was held at St. Margaret's and he was buried in Rock Creek Cemetery. His pallbearers included Charles D. Walcott, head of the USGS.

== Selected publications ==
=== Books ===
- Report of the Rhode Island Map Commission to the General Assembly, at its January session, 1893. With Daniel Webster Hoyt. Providence: State of Rhode Island / E.L. Freeman & Son, 1893.
- The Goode Diary: A Personal Journal of the Northern Transcontinental Survey, 1883. W. S. Dawson, 1990. ISBN 9781878515292

=== Monographs ===
- "Magnetic Declination." West Virginia Geological and Economic Survey, vol. 1, 1899.
- Analyses of Rocks from the Laboratory of the United States Geological Survey 1880–1899. With Frank Wigglesworth Clarke, Henry Gannett, and Fred Boughton Weeks. United States Geological Survey, 1900.
- "Boundaries of the United States and of the Several States and Territories, with an Outline of the History of All Important Changes of Territory," with Henry Gannett. United States Geological Survey Issues, no. 170–172, 1900.
- "Survey of the Boundary Line between Idaho and Montana, from the International Boundary to the Crest of the Bitterroot Mountains," Bulletin of the United States Geological Survey, no. 170, 1900.
- "Triangulation, Primary Traverse and Spirit Leveling: 1896/97-1899." with Herbert Michael Wilson, John Henry Renshawe, and E. M. Douglas. Annual Report of the United States Geological Survey to the Secretary of the Interior, 1900.
- "Results of Spirit-Leveling, Fiscal Year 1900-1901", Bulletin of the United States Geological Survey, no. 185, 1901.
- "Results of Primary Triangulation and Primary Traverse, Fiscal Year 1901-2" with H. M. Wilson, J. H. Renshaw, and E. M. Douglas. Bulletin of the United States Geological Survey, no. 201, 1902.
- "The Geography and Geology of Alaska: A Summary of Existing Knowledge," with Alfred Hulse Brooks and Cleveland Abbe. United States Geological Survey Professional Paper, no. 45, 1906.

=== Journal articles ===
- "A Trip to Panama and Darien." National Geographic Magazine, vol. 1, no. 4, 1889.
- "Height of Mt. Rainier." National Geographic Magazine, vol. 9, no. 3, March 1898, pp. 97–98.
- "Bitter Root Forest Reserve," National Geographic Magazine, vol. 9, no. 9, September 1898, pp 11–24.
- "The Idaho-Montana Boundary Line," National Geographic Magazine, vol. 11, no. 1, January 1900, pp. 23–28.
- "The Northwestern Boundary between the United States and Canada," Journal of the American Geographical Society of New York, vol. 32, no. 5, 1900, pp. 465–470.

=== Maps ===
==== General maps ====
- Map of Northern Virginia, USGS, 1894

==== USGS topographic maps ====
The following is an incomplete listing of maps by Goode. The following topographic maps were issued by the United States Geological Survey and were documented in WorldCat and the Internet Archive. Note that Goode is credited for his original triangulation or work on all future editions of maps that rely on that data.

- Alaska Juneau Special Map, 1904
- Arizona-California Needles Special Map, 1911
- California-Arizona Colorado River Valley Surveys, 1903
- California-Arizona Yuma Quadrangle, 1911
- California Anaheim Quadrangle, 1905
- California Arroyo Grande Quadrangle, 1897
- California Calabasas Quadrangle, 1908
- California Capistrano Quadrangle, 1909
- California Carquinez Quadrangle, 1901
- California Concord Quadrangle, 1915
- California Corona Quadrangle, 1902
- California Cucamonga Quadrangle, 1903
- California Cuyamaca Quadrangle, 1936
- California Dardanelles Quadrangle, 1898
- California Deep Creek Quadrangle, 1902
- California Elsinore Quadrangle, 1901
- California Fairoaks Quadrangle, 1902
- California Fernando Quadrangle, 1900
- California Goleta Special, 1911
- California Haywards Quadrangle, 1915
- California Hesperia Quadrangle, 1902
- California Hueneme Quadrangle, 1904
- California Indio Quadrangle, 1904
- California Kaiser Quadrangle, 1904
- California Karquines Quadrangle, 1901
- California Kaweah Quadrangle, 1909
- California La Jolla Quadrangle, 1903
- California Las Bolsas Sheet, 1908
- California Los Angeles Sheet, 1897
- California Mother Lode District, 1899
- California Mt. Diablo Quadrangle, 1898
- California Mt. Hamilton, 1897
- California Mt. Pinos Quadrangle, 1903
- California Napa Quadrangle, 1902
- California Pasadena Sheet, 1900
- California Piru Quadrangle, 1944
- California Pomona Quadrangle, 1904
- California Port Harford Sheet, 1897
- California Ramona Quadrangle, 1903
- California Randsburg Quadrangle, 1947
- California Redlands Quadrangle, 1901
- California Redondo Sheet, 1927
- California Riverside Quadrangle, 1901
- California Rock Creek, 1916
- California San Antonio Quadrangle, 1943
- California San Diego Quadrangle, 1904
- California San Fernando Quadrangle, 1924
- California San Gorgonio Quadrangle, 1902
- California San Jacinto Quadrangle, 1901
- California San Luis Quadrangle, 1903
- California San Pedro Sheet, 1926
- California Santa Ana Quadrangle, 1945
- California Santa Cruz Quadrangle, 1902
- California Santa Paula Quadrangle, 1942
- California Santa Susana Quadrangle, 1908
- California Santa Ynez Quadrangle, 1905
- California Sequoia and General Grant National Parks, 1910
- California Southern Sheet no. 1, 1900
- California Tamalpais Quadrangle, 1897
- California Tejon Quadrangle, 1903
- California Triunfo Pass Quadrangle, 1921
- California Tujunga Quadrangle, 1909
- California Ventura Quadrangle, 1904
- California Yosemite Quadrangle, 1909
- Idaho Sandpoint Quadrangle, 1901
- Idaho-Montana Central Part of Bitterroot Range, 1904
- Idaho-Montana Coeur d'Alene District, 1939
- Idaho Rathdrum Quadrangle, 1903
- Kansas Garden City Quadrangle, 1949
- Kansas Garnett Sheet, 1951
- Kansas-Missouri-Indian Territory Joplin Sheet, 1920
- Kansas Parkerville Sheet, 1930
- Massachusetts-New Hampshire. Groton Sheet, 1890
- Massachusetts-New Hampshire. Marlboro Sheet, 1890
- Massachusetts-New Hampshire. Winchendon Sheet, 1890
- Nevada Tonapah Mining Maps, 1910
- Oregon Baker City Quadrangle, 1901
- Oregon Coos Bay Quadrangle, 1900
- Oregon Port Orford Quadrangle, 1899
- Oregon Riddles Quadrangle, 1911
- Oregon Roseburg Quadrangle, 1898
- Texas El Paso Special Map, 1909
- Texas Nueces Quadrangle, 1897
- Utah Bingham Mining Map, 1901
- Utah Tintic Mining Map, 1898
- Virginia, Map of Northern, 1894
- Washington Chelan Quadrangle, 1917
- Washington Chiwaukum Quadrangle, 1950
- Washington Chopaka Quadrangle, 1948
- Washington Ellensburg Quadrangle, 1951
- Washington Glacier Peak Quadrangle, 1912
- Washington-Idaho Spokane Quadrangle, 1901
- Washington Methow Quadrangle, 1908
- Washington Mt. Aix Quadrangle, 1957
- Washington Mount Stuart Quadrangle, 1903
- Washington Osoyoos Quadrangle, 1951
- Washington Republic Quadrangle, 1944
- Washington Skykomish Quadrangle, 1905
- Washington Snoqualmie Quadrangle, 1909
- Washington Stehekin Quadrangle, 1965
- Washington Stillaguamish Quadrangle, 1928
- Washington Skykomish Quadrangle, 1902
