= Eklutna Glacier =

Glacier in Alaska

- Idlu Bena Li'a
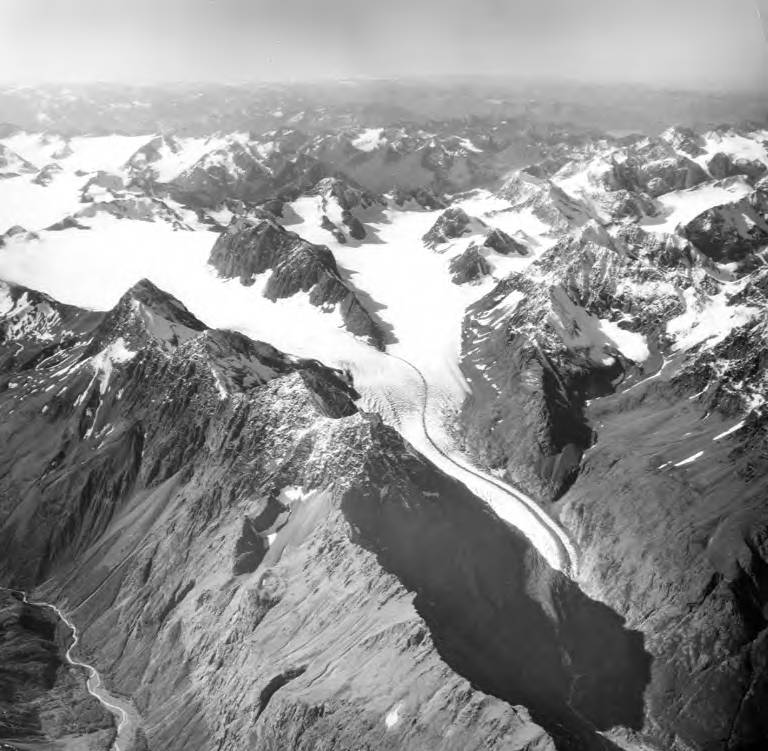
- Eklutna Glacier, valley glacier, August 25, 1964

- Location within Alaska
- Interactive map of Eklutna Glacier
- Coordinates: 61.264137°N 148.988343°W
- Area: 11.5 square miles (30 km^{2})
- Length: 6 miles (9.7 km)

Eklutna Glacier is a land terminating glacier in Chugach State Park and the Chugach Mountains near Anchorage, Alaska. Runoff from Eklutna Glacier contributes to Eklutna Lake, the main source of drinking water for the Anchorage community as well as hydroelectric power via the Eklutna Hydroelectric Project. However, Eklutna Glacier is shrinking in response to climate change which will inevitably affect downstream water resources. Eklutna Glacier is also known by the Dena'ina name: Idlu Bena Li'a.

== Geology ==
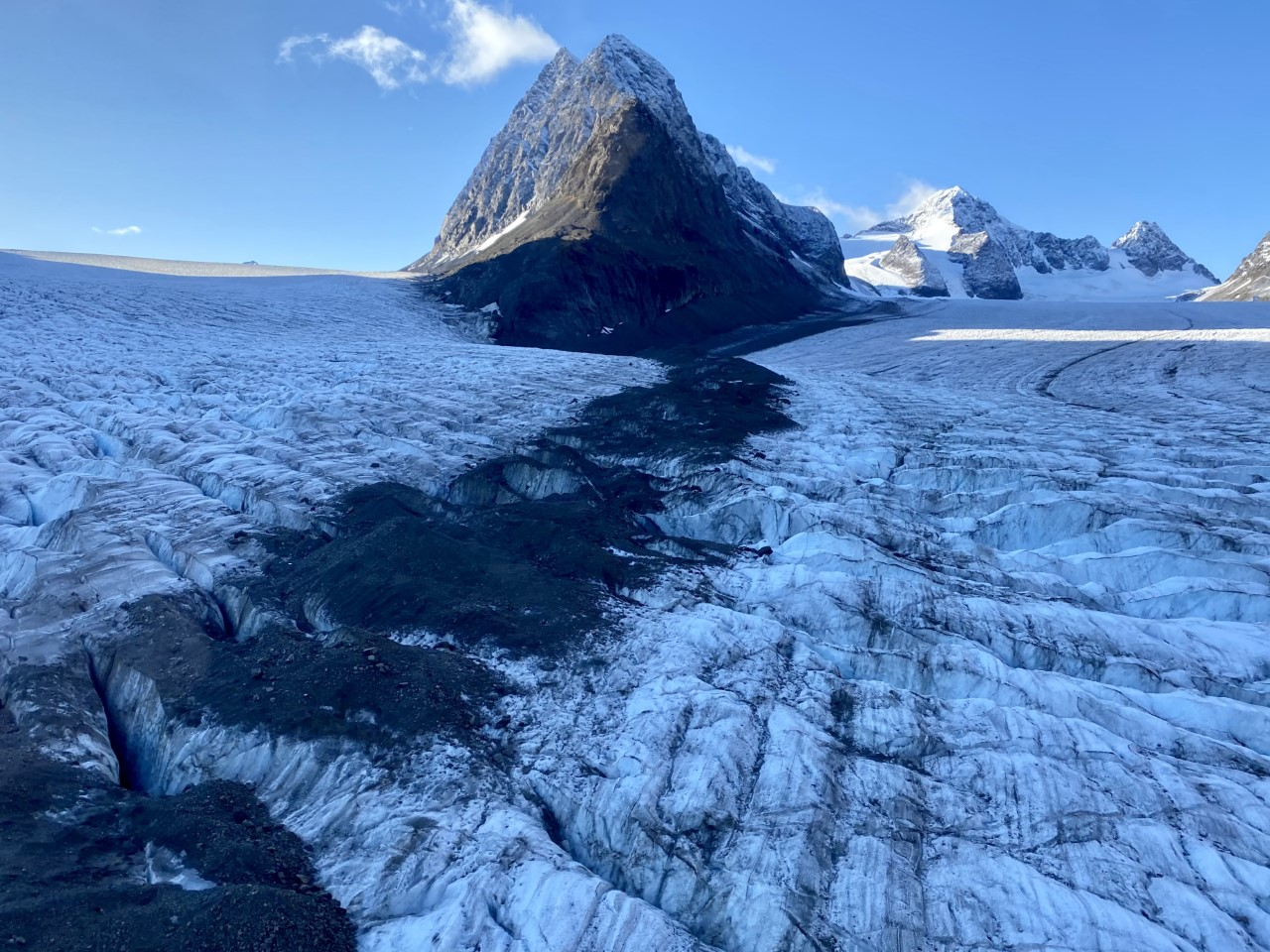
Photo of Eklutna Glacier looking up-glacier at the Main Branch (left) and West Branch (right), September 10, 2020. (Peril Peak centered)

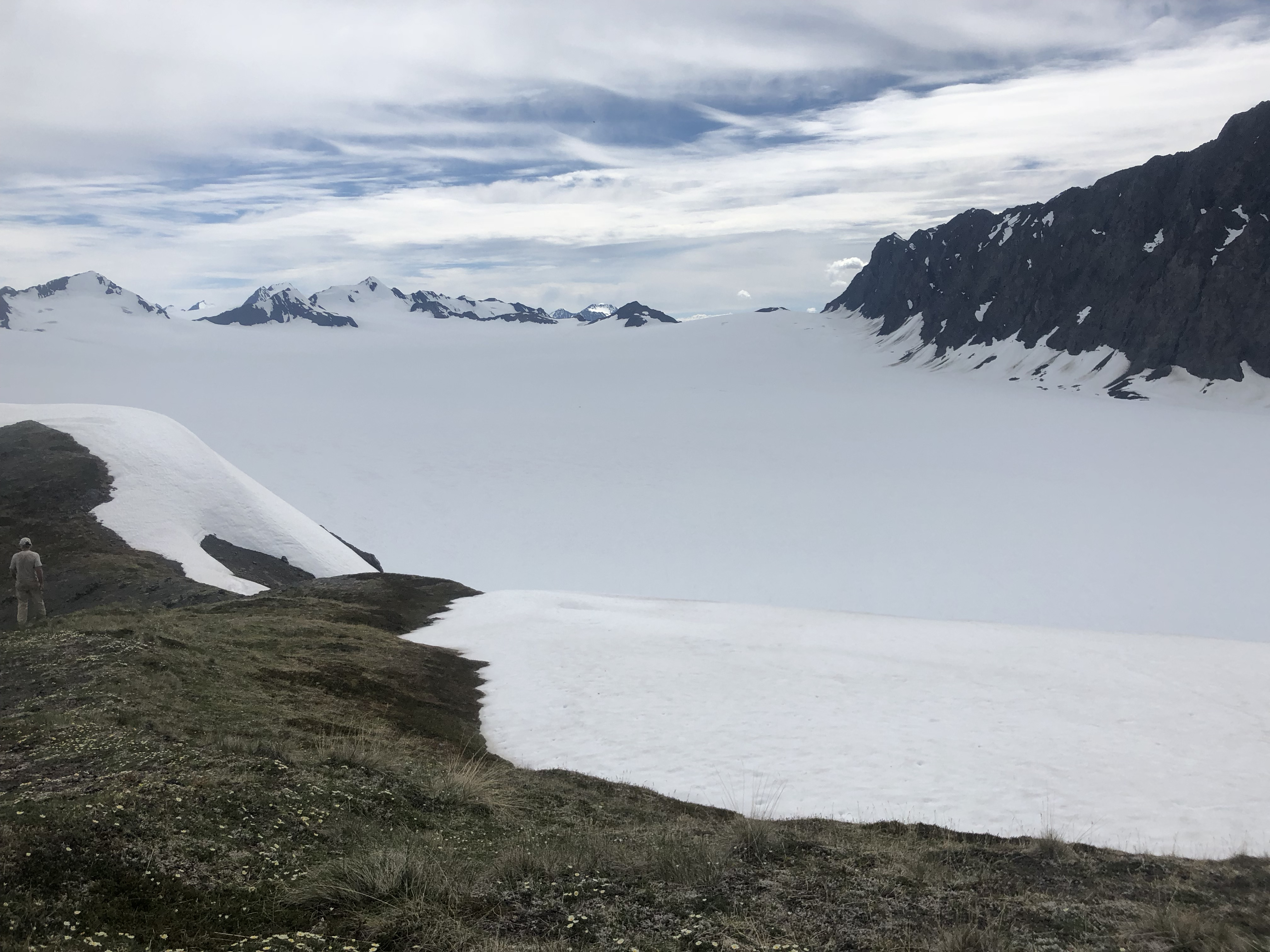
Photo of the Main Branch of Eklutna Glacier from a northeast bordering ridge looking south up-glacier, July 4, 2018.

Eklutna Glacier is a 10 km long, 29 square km, valley glacier originating from the Pleistocene epoch. The glacier has two branches that converge about 2.7 km above the glacier terminus. The Main Branch is characterized by a large, low-sloping basin compared to the smaller and steeper West Branch. Glacier elevation ranges from 580 m above sea level at the terminus to a maximum of 2100 m, according to 2010 statistics. The steep valley walls surrounding much of the glacier contain peaks over 2,500 m. Whiteout Glacier neighbors Eklutna Glacier at the southern edge of the main branch. Glacial melt heads the West Fork Eklutna River which flows north to Eklutna Lake, which was created by a natural damming at the northwest end of the glacially carved Eklutna River Valley by a recessional moraine.

== Climate Change ==
Like many Alaskan glaciers, Eklutna Glacier is shrinking due to climate warming. Eklutna Glacier is located within the maritime Cook Inlet climate zone. Land terminating, lower elevation glaciers in maritime climates are losing mass at higher rates than continental glaciers. Field observations of Eklutna Glacier between 1975 and 2015 found a terminus retreat of 1.6 km. However, surface thinning accounts for most of the mass loss, with an average rate of -0.85 m per year of surface elevation change between 2010 and 2015 compared to -0.6 m per year from 1957 to 2010. Eklutna Glacier has an overall negative mass balance, meaning more melt is occurring than snow accumulation. As climate warming continues to cause ice melt, the glacier will continue decreasing in mass and eventually recede so much that it will no longer release meltwater. This will cause significant changes in streamflow for the downstream water resources of Eklutna Lake that depend on extra inflow from Eklutna Glacier.

== History ==
Eklutna Glacier and neighboring Whiteout Glacier were used as a military training site between the 1950s and mid 1970s. Soldiers based out of Fort Richardson practiced skills for arctic warfare including tactical cross country skiing, rappelling into crevasses, and glacier travel safety. Training in Alaska's harsh winters served to prepare soldiers for any cold winter that might arise in Eurasian battle grounds.

== Research ==
Observations of Eklutna Glacier terminus retreat have occurred since the early 1900s and research of the glacier's dynamics have since become more robust. A USGS study in cooperation with the Municipality of Anchorage investigated glacial runoff and sediment contribution to the Eklutna Lake basin during the years 1985 to 1988. Glacial field work has been employed since the late 1980s by various agencies and research groups, focusing on accumulation and ablation measurements. This includes digging snow pits, setting stakes for ablation and accumulation measurements, climatological station deployment, and laser altimetry.

== Recreation ==
The Eklutna Traverse is a popular mountaineering and glacier navigating route that connects Eklutna Glacier, Whiteout Glacier, and Eagle Glacier. The retreat and thinning of Eklutna Glacier has made the once easy walk up the glacier terminus much more hazardous. Glacier skills and experience are advised for this technical traverse. The Mountaineering Club of Alaska maintains three historic huts along the Eklutna Traverse that can be used by travelers, including Pichler's Perch, built in 1964, on the northeast side of Eklutna Glacier near the terminus.

== See also ==
- Grace Hoeman, killed in 1971 by avalanche while traversing the Eklutna Glacier
