= Marcus Baker =

American naturalist and journalist (1849–1903)

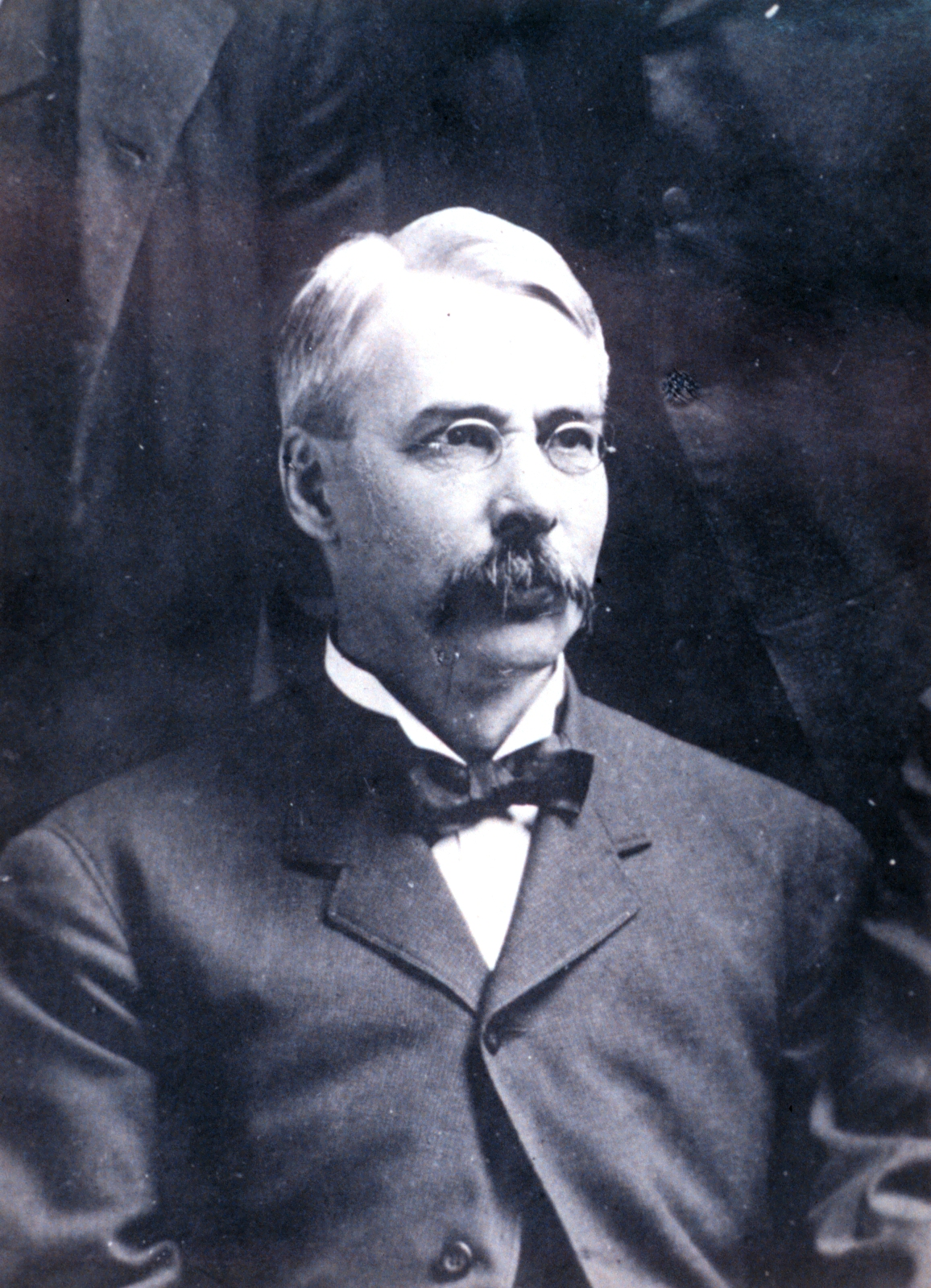
Studio portrait of Marcus Baker

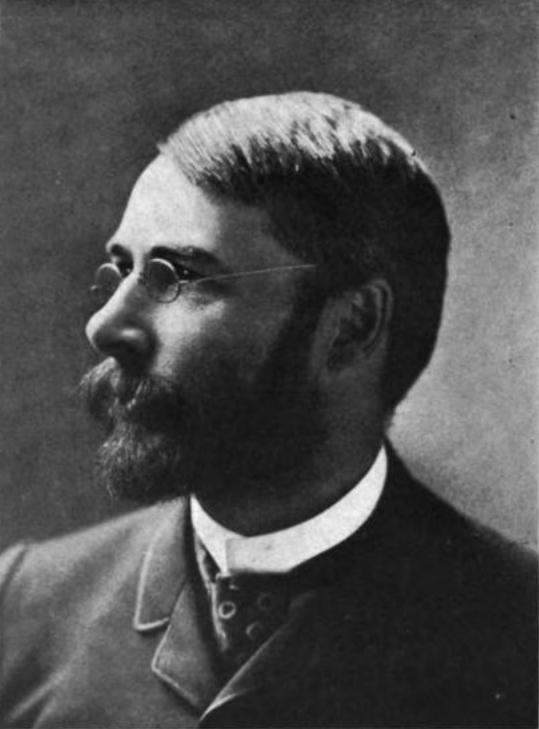
Photograph of Marcus Baker as a young man in wire-rim glasses with a dark beard. Probably from the early 1880s when Baker worked in Los Angeles.

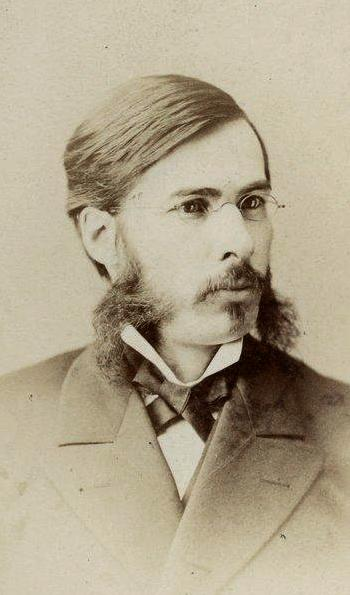
Marcus Baker's portrait

Marcus Baker (September 23, 1849 – December 12, 1903) was an American naturalist, explorer of Alaska, journalist, and newspaper editor.

== Early life and education ==
Baker was born September 23, 1849, in Kalamazoo, Michigan, and graduated from the University of Michigan. After graduating, he worked as an instructor of mathematics at the University of Michigan from 1871 to 1873. On May 25, 1899, he married Marian Una Strong in Kalamazoo, Michigan.

== Career ==
In 1872, he was hired by William Healey Dall to be a naturalist on an expedition to Alaska, where he collected topographic and hydrographical data. He would continue to go with Dall to Alaska every year until 1888, when he co-founded the National Geographic Society and became one of the first editors of the National Geographic Magazine. He was one of the 15 original signers of the articles of incorporation for the National Geographic Society in 1888. Baker was well known for his work in geology and cartography.

== Baker's home ==
Baker's home in DC was built in 1889 at 1905 16th Street NW. It is a 4,000 square foot five-bedroom townhouse with a two-bedroom, lower-level apartment. The house's molding and woodwork has been restored to preserve the house, however a media room with surround sound and a home theater, a garage, and outdoor decks have been added.

== Organizations ==
In 1890 Baker was named to the newly created US Board on Geographic Names by President Benjamin Harrison in Executive Order No. 28, as a member from the United States Geological Survey.

== Death ==
On December 12, 1903, he had a heart attack and died in Washington DC. Mount Marcus Baker in the Chugach Range of southern Alaska is named after him.
