= Grace Hoeman =

American mountaineer

Grace Hoeman M.D.
- Born: Grace Nieman; 1921; Silver Beach, Washington
- Died: April 12, 1971 (aged 49); Eklutna Glacier, Alaska
- Cause of death: Avalanche
- Monuments: Mount Grace (Chugach Mountains)
- Education: University of Berlin, Bachelors in Medicine; University of Utrecht, doctors of Medicine; Yale University, M.P.H.
- Occupation: Physician
- Organization: American Alpine Journal
- Known for: Led first female expedition to the summit of Denali
- Spouse: Vin Hoeman
- Children: 2

Grace Jansen Hoeman née Nieman (1921– April 12, 1971) was an American mountaineer and pioneering female mountain climber. A doctor, she made a number of first ascents in Alaska. Hoeman led the first all-female expedition to Denali in 1970. She died in an avalanche while climbing Eklutna Glacier in Alaska.

== Biography ==
Grace Nieman was born in Silver Beach, Washington. At age 4, she moved to Holland with her Dutch mother, Juul. Her stepfather taught her to ski when she was 9.

In 1942, she moved to Berlin to attend school and married a doctor who was conscripted to serve as a medic; he was killed in combat two years after they married. In 1944, she earned a bachelors of medicine degree from the University of Berlin. In Berlin, she trained in surgery and gynecology. After completing her studies, she survived myocarditis and tuberculosis. In 1948 she earned her doctorate in medicine from University of Utrecht.

=== Return to the United States ===
In 1950, Jansen returned to the United States and attended Yale University on scholarship. She met her second husband at Yale. In 1953 she earned a master's degree in Public Health. She went on to teach preventative medicine in Buffalo, New York, worked for the Erie County Health Department and later entered a residency at Syracuse University. Her second marriage ended in divorce at this time.

=== Alaska ===
In 1965, she began practicing anaesthesiology in Anchorage, Alaska where she began climbing mountains in earnest. On December 30, 1966, she married John Vincent Hoeman, a climber and naturalist. She made over 120 ascents in Alaska with her husband Vin Hoeman, including 20 first ascents. Five first ascents were made solo.

In 1968, Grace and her husband Vin summited three days after the first summit of Mount Igikpak. That year, she accompanied her husband on a four-person expedition of the first traverse of the Harding Icefield.

In 1969, she summited Mount Rainier, as well as Orizaba and Chimborazo. That year, she aimed to accompany her husband to Dhaulagiri where he would ultimately lead an unsuccessful climbing expedition that led to his death. Due to her gender, Grace Hoeman was unable to join the expedition.

Grace Hoeman was distraught after her husband's death, especially as she was unable to join him on the failed expedition. Hoeman dedicated her life to finishing her husband's unfinished work writing a guide to the highest peaks in all 50 states.

In June 1969 she made a first summit of Alaska's Mount Kimball.

=== "Denali damsels" ===
In 1970, Hoeman led a group of women to the first successful all-female summit of Denali via the West Buttress Route. Alongside Hoeman, the climbing party included Arlene Blum, Margaret Clark, Faye Kerr, Dana Joan Isherwood, and Margaret Young. They were known as the "Denali Damsels". During the descent, Hoeman collapsed at 19,500 feet, and was pulled to safety by her team. They later descended the mountain safely.

=== Final climb ===
In 1971, Hoeman and climbing partners John Samuelson and Hans van der Laan made a ski touring expedition traversing the Eklutna Glacier outside of Anchorage. The trio were well-prepared for the trek, which aimed to reach the community of Girdwood. Hoeman and van der Laan were killed on April 12 by an avalanche while traversing a slope. Hoeman and van der Laan's remains were found in the summer of 1971 when snow melted and exposed their bodies.

Hoeman was survived by two daughters from her first marriage and three grandchildren.

== See also ==
- Barbara Washburn, first woman to climb Denali
