= Mount Marcus Baker =

Mountain in the U.S. state of Alaska

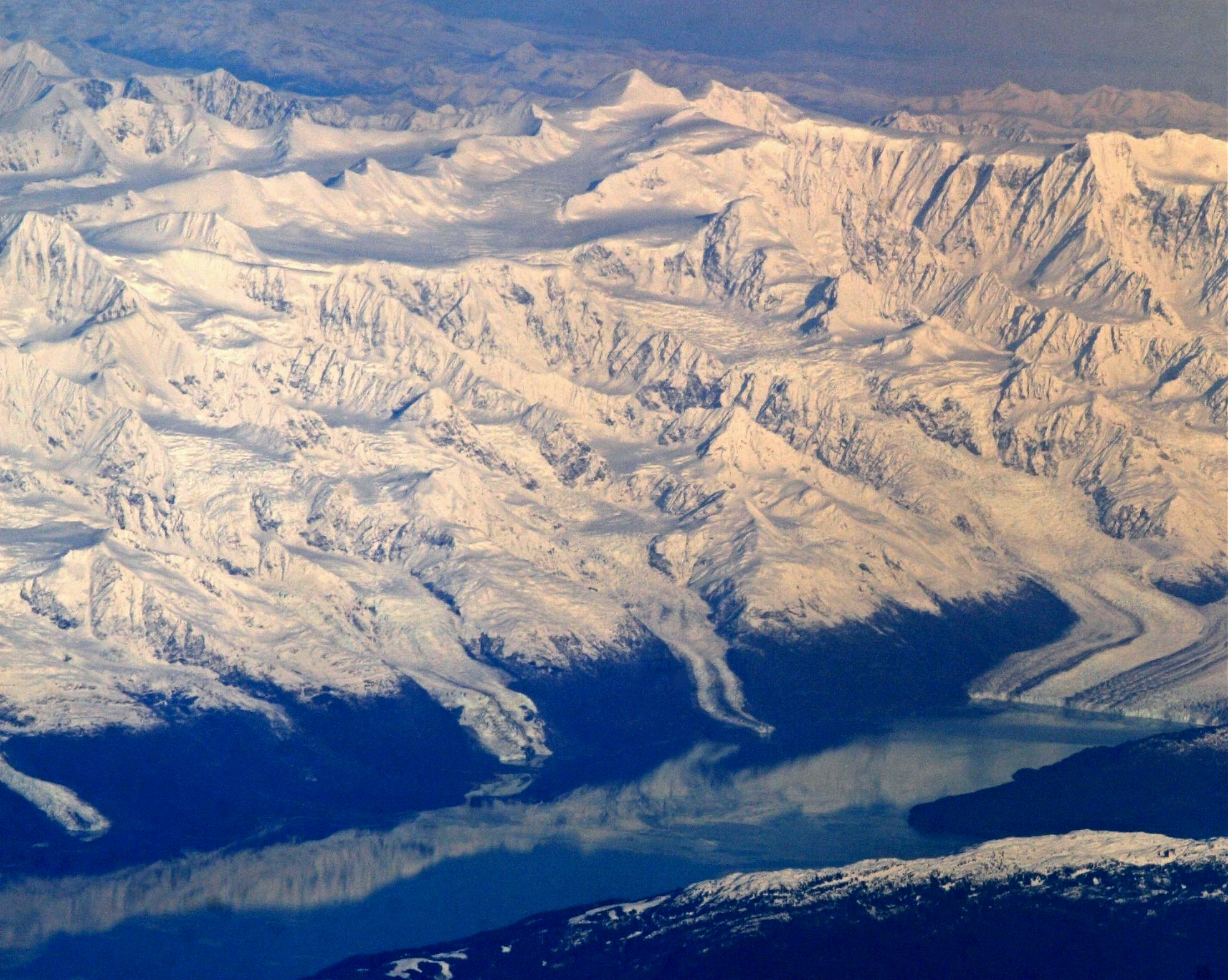
- Mt. Marcus Baker centered at top

Highest point
- Elevation: 13,176 ft (4,016 m) NGVD 29
- Prominence: 10,726 ft (3,269 m)
- Listing: World most prominent peaks 67th; North America highest peaks 117th; North America prominent peaks 13th; North America isolated peaks 103rd; US highest major peaks 97th; US most prominent peaks 8th; US most isolated peaks 39th; Alaska highest major peaks 23rd
- Coordinates: 61°26′16″N 147°45′02″W

Geography
- Location within Alaska
- Location: Matanuska-Susitna Borough, Alaska, U.S.
- Parent range: Chugach Mountains
- Topo map: USGS Anchorage B-3 Quadrangle

Climbing
- First ascent: 1938 by Norman Bright, Peter Gabriel, Norman Dyhrenfurth, Bradford Washburn
- Easiest route: Snow/ice climb (Alaska grade 2)

Mount Marcus Baker (Ahtna: Ts'itonhna Dghilaaye’; Dena'ina: Ch'atanhtnu Dghelaya) is the highest peak of the Chugach Mountains of Alaska. It is located approximately 75 miles (121 km) east of Anchorage. This peak is very prominent because of its proximity to tidewater and is only 12 miles (19 km) north of the calving face of Harvard Glacier. Mount Marcus Baker is ranked 67th in the world when measured by topographic prominence.

== History ==
Mount Marcus Baker was originally called "Mount Saint Agnes"; according to Bradford Washburn, James W. Bagley of the USGS named it after his wife Agnes, adding the "Saint" in hopes of making the name stick. The name was later changed to honor a cartographer and geologist named Marcus Baker.

The peak was first climbed on June 19, 1938 by a party led by famed explorer Bradford Washburn; the climb took almost two months owing to weather delays. Today's standard route is the North Ridge. Despite being much lower in elevation than Denali, Marcus Baker is a similarly serious ascent, due to the remoteness of the peak and resulting length of the approach and climb. A number of noted climbers have perished or sustained permanent injury in attempting to summit the peak as climbing conditions can change rapidly as storms arise. In early 1988, a State of Alaska Fish and Game biologist, 28-year-old Sylvia Jean Lane, succumbed to hypothermia as a two-day storm separated her from the two others in the climbing party attempting to dash to the top in a winter ascent.

== Gallery ==
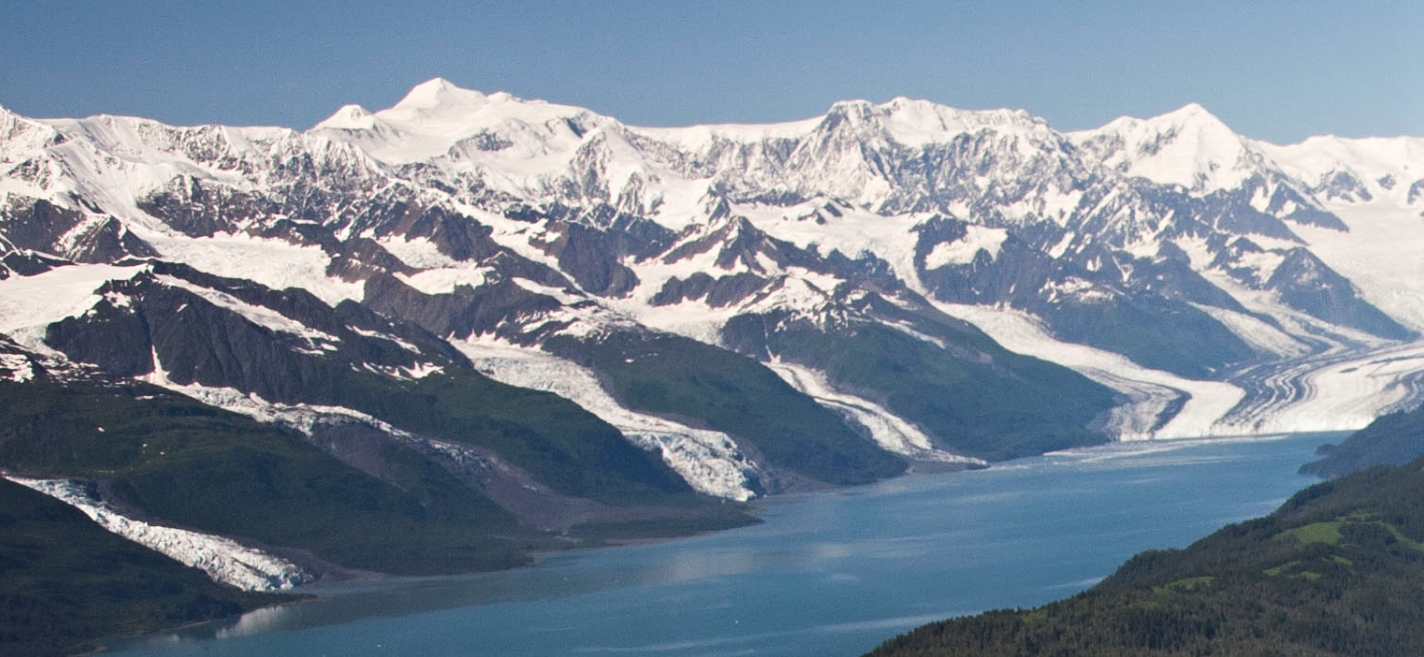
Mount Marcus Baker is the highest point in the distance left of center

== See also ==
- List of mountain peaks of North America
  - List of mountain peaks of the United States
    - List of mountain peaks of Alaska
- List of Ultras of the United States
