= Rabbit Creek (Anchorage, Alaska) =

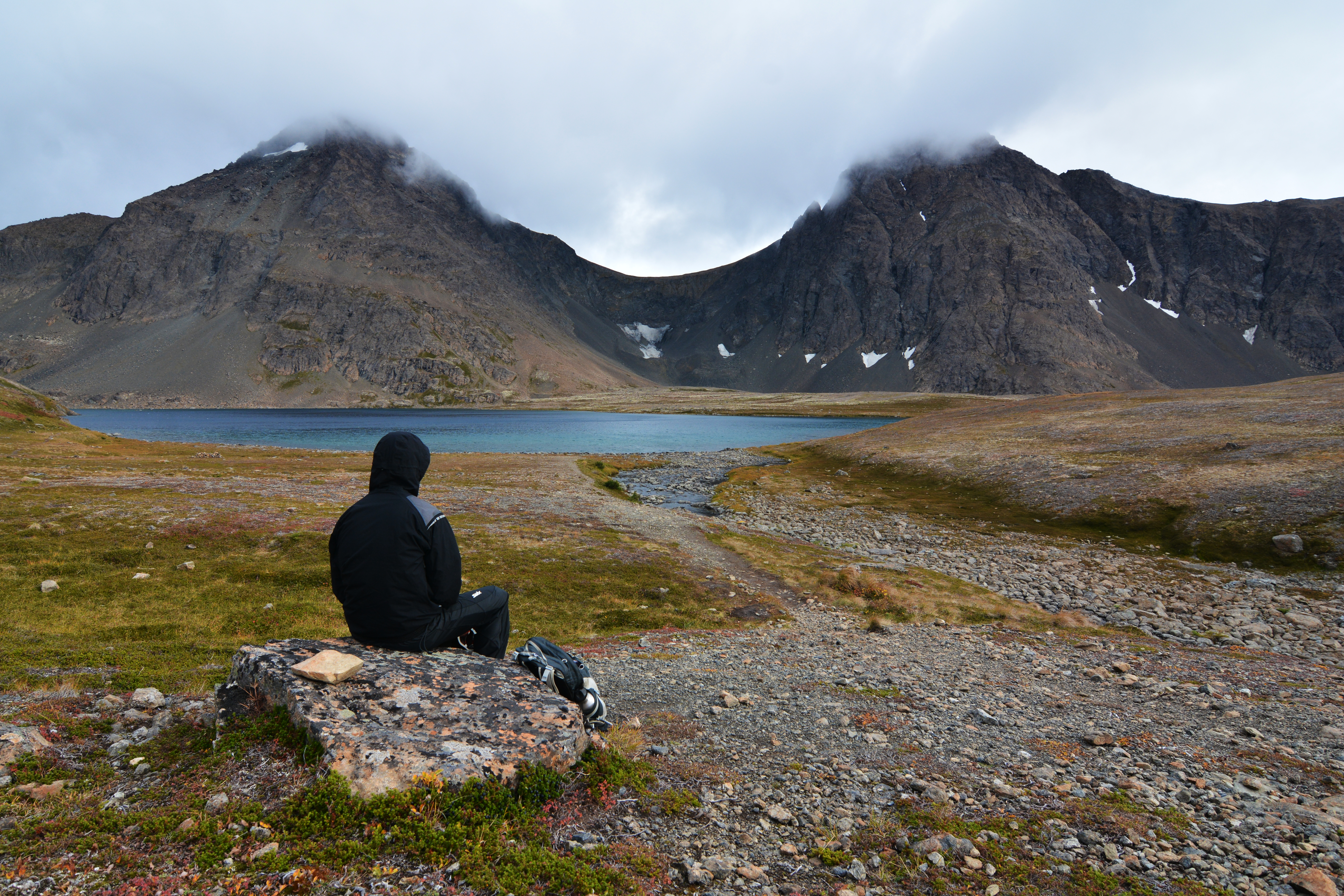
- The headwaters of Rabbit Creek at Rabbit Lake, with North and South Suicide Peaks in the background

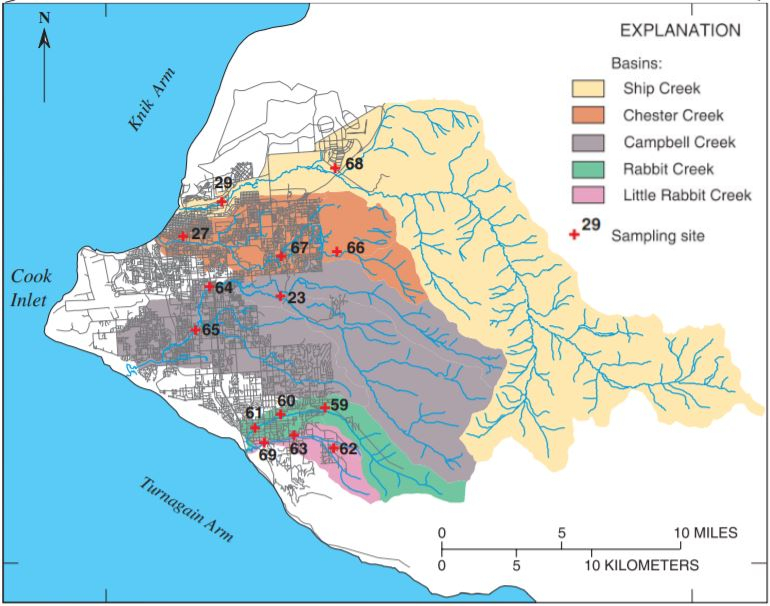
- Anchorage Watersheds with Rabbit Creek and Little Rabbit Creek in green and pink, respectively

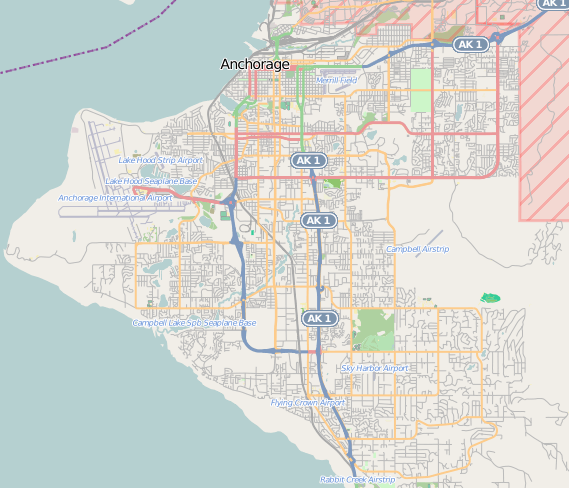
- Location of the mouth of Rabbit Creek in Alaska Rabbit Creek (Anchorage, Alaska) (Anchorage)
- Native name: Ggeh Betnu (Denaʼina)

Location
- Country: United States
- State: Alaska
- Municipality: Anchorage

Physical characteristics
- Source: Rabbit Lake
  - location: Chugach Mountains
  - coordinates: 61.0419444°N 149.5855556°W
  - elevation: 3,153 ft (961 m)
- Mouth: Turnagain Arm, Anchorage
  - coordinates: 61.0780556°N 149.8236111°W
  - elevation: 13 ft (4.0 m)
- Length: 15 mi (24 km)
- Discharge
  - location: Turnagain Arm

Basin features
- Tributaries
  - left: Little Rabbit Creek

Rabbit Creek is one of several streams that flow through the city of Anchorage, Alaska. It runs for 15 miles from the Chugach Mountains to Turnagain Arm. Before English-speaking settlers arrived in Anchorage, the Dena'ina called the creek "Ggeh Betnu."

== Course ==
The headwaters of Rabbit Creek originate at 3,153 ft (961 m) at Rabbit Lake, a 75-acre (0.30 km^{2}) alpine lake at the base of North Yuyanq' Ch'ex and South Yuyanq' Ch'ex. Rabbit Lake is a popular hiking destination and can be reached via either the Rabbit Lake Trail or the neighboring McHugh Creek drainage. The creek then descends from the Chugach Mountains and flows west through residential areas and green spaces including Griffin Park. Near its mouth at Potter Marsh it receives a tributary from Little Rabbit Creek, which drains the hillside just south of the main creek channel. It then flows southwest under the Seward Highway and empties into Turnagain Arm of Cook Inlet.

== Recreation ==
A well-traversed 4.4-mile hiking trail begins at Canyon Road and follows the upper stretch of Rabbit Creek through the Chugach Mountains to Rabbit Lake.

== See also ==
- List of rivers of Alaska
