= Benign Peak =

Mountain in Alaska, U.S.

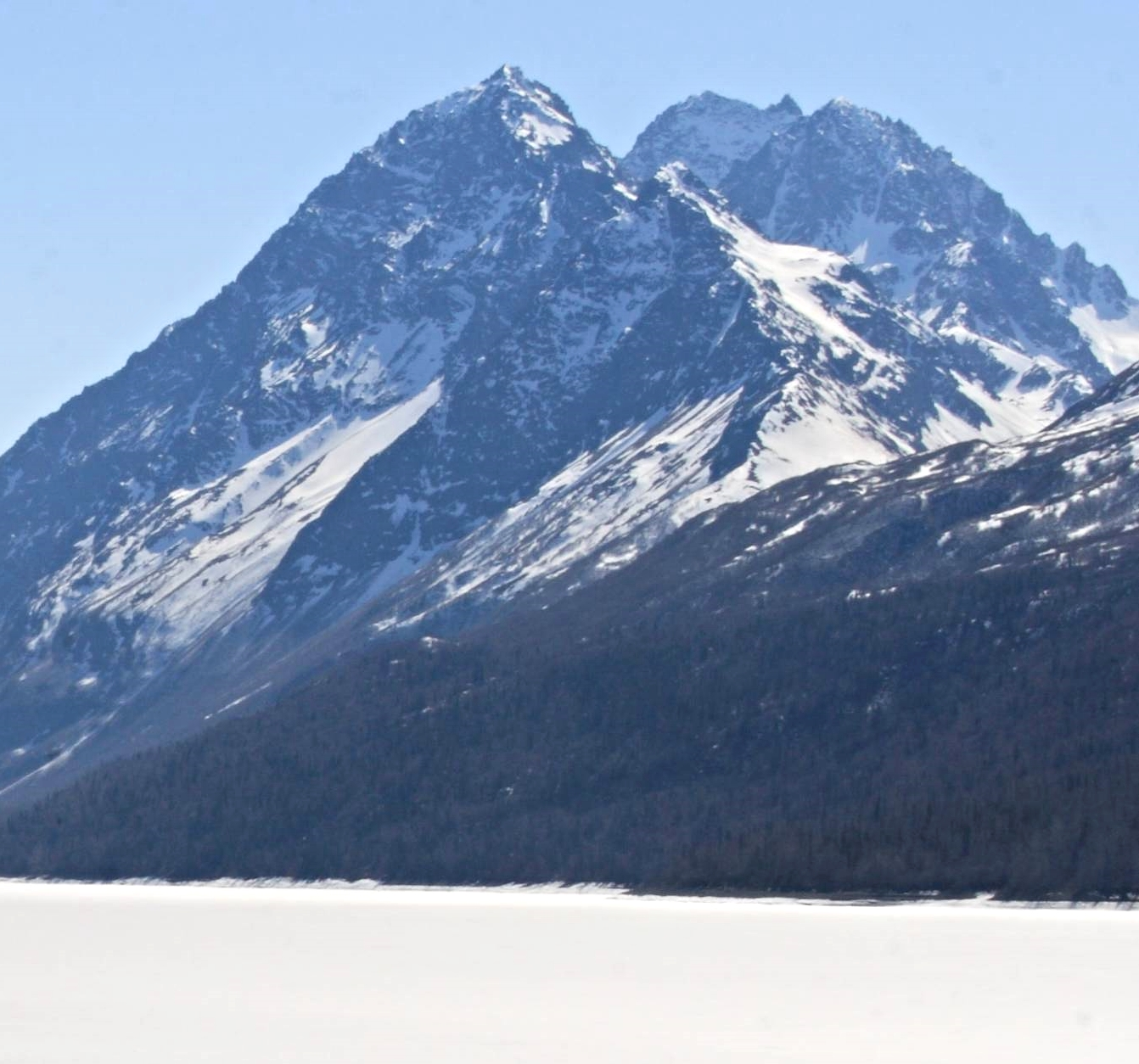
- North aspect from frozen Eklutna Lake

Highest point
- Elevation: 7,235 ft (2,205 m)
- Prominence: 1,735 ft (529 m)
- Parent peak: Mount Rumble (7,530 ft)
- Isolation: 2.2 mi (3.5 km)
- Coordinates: 61°16′25″N 149°01′29″W

Geography
- Location within Alaska
- Interactive map of Benign Peak
- Location: Chugach State Park; Anchorage Municipality; Alaska, United States
- Parent range: Chugach Mountains
- Topo map: USGS Anchorage B-6

Climbing
- First ascent: 1965
- Easiest route: Southeast gully

Benign Peak is a 7,235 ft (2,210 m) elevation mountain summit located in the western Chugach Mountains, in Anchorage Municipality in the U.S. state of Alaska. The mountain is situated in Chugach State Park, 28 mi (45 km) east of Anchorage, and 4.5 mi (7 km) south of Eklutna Lake. The nearest higher peak is Mount Rumble, 2.2 mi (4 km) to the southwest, and The Mitre is set 2.4 mi (4 km) east-southeast, on the opposite side of the Eklutna Glacier. Although modest in elevation, relief is significant since the eastern aspect of the mountain rises over 5,000 feet above this glacier in approximately one mile. This peak belongs to a group of peaks in the Eklutna River drainage which start with the letter "B", such as Bold Peak, Bashful Peak, Baleful Peak, and Mt. Beelzebub. Benign Peak was so named in 1965 by the Mountaineering Club of Alaska because "nearby Bellicose Peak was a much harder climb, while this one's nature was quite benign since the rock was not too rotten and the weather wasn't too bad." Benign Peak's name was officially adopted in 1966 by the U.S. Board on Geographic Names. The first ascent of this mountain was made in August 1965 by Art Davidson and John Vincent Hoeman by ascending the East Face, and descending the South Gully.

== Climate ==
Based on the Köppen climate classification, Benign Peak is located in a subarctic climate zone with long, cold, snowy winters, and mild summers. Weather systems coming off the Gulf of Alaska are forced upwards by the Chugach Mountains (orographic lift), causing heavy precipitation in the form of rainfall and snowfall. Winter temperatures can drop below −10 °F with wind chill factors below −20 °F. Precipitation runoff from the peak drains into Cook Inlet via the Eklutna River and Peters Creek.

== Gallery ==
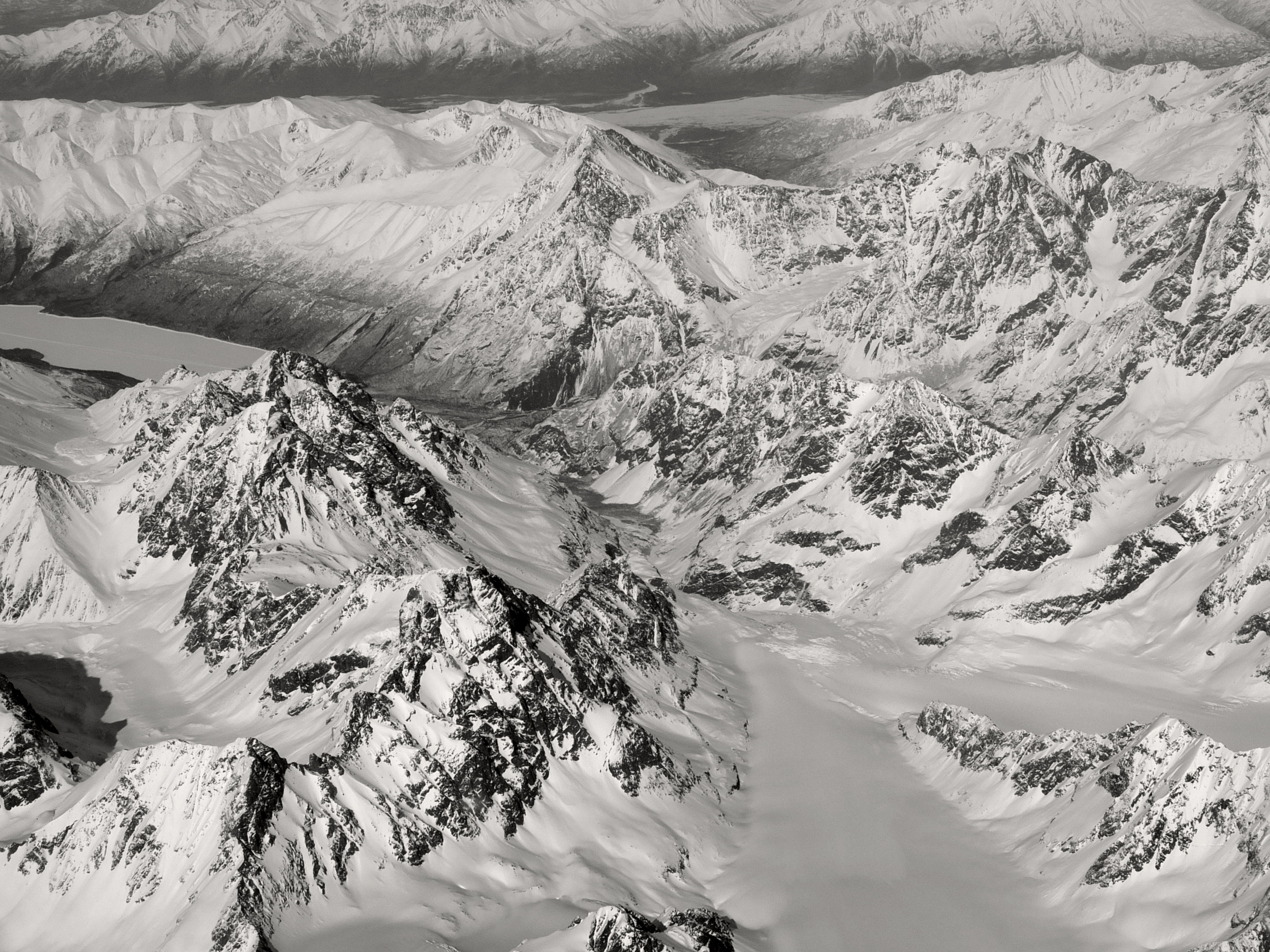
South aspect of Benign Peak to left

== See also ==
- List of mountain peaks of Alaska
- Geology of Alaska
