= Mount Yukla =

Mountain summit in Alaska, United States

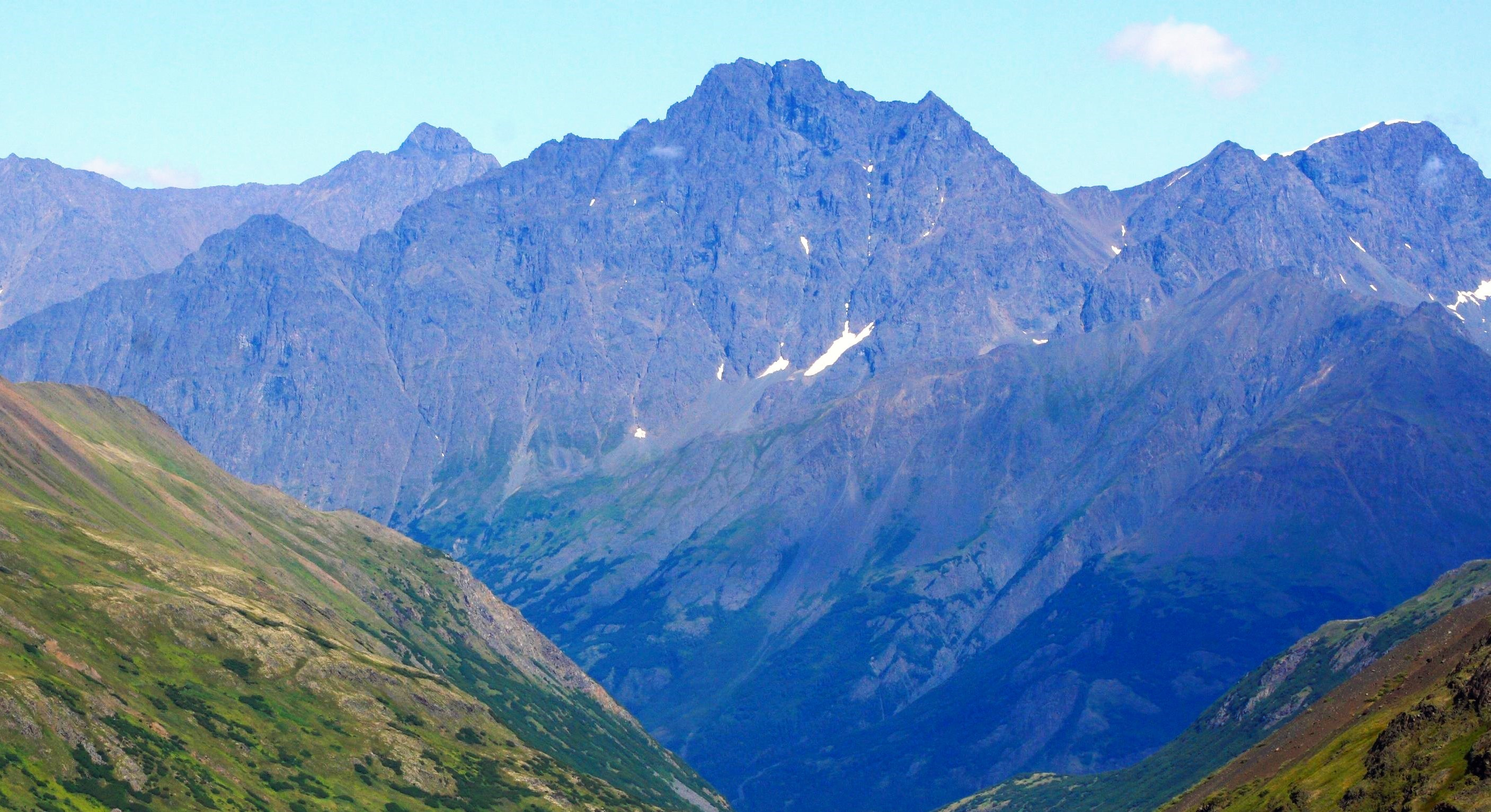
- South aspect

Highest point
- Elevation: 7,569 ft (2,307 m)
- Prominence: 1,985 ft (605 m)
- Parent peak: Bellicose Peak (7,640 ft)
- Isolation: 4.41 mi (7.10 km)
- Coordinates: 61°11′28″N 149°06′53″W

Geography
- Location within Alaska
- Interactive map of Mount Yukla
- Country: United States
- State: Alaska
- Borough: Anchorage
- Protected area: Chugach State Park
- Parent range: Chugach Mountains
- Topo map: USGS Anchorage A-6

Climbing
- First ascent: 1964

Mount Yukla is a 7,569-foot (2,307 m) mountain summit in Alaska, United States.

== Description ==
Mount Yukla is located 25 miles (40 km) east of Anchorage in the western Chugach Mountains. It ranks as the highest peak in the Eagle River drainage, and fourth-highest peak within Chugach State Park. Precipitation runoff from the mountain drains to Knik Arm via the Eagle River. Although modest in elevation, topographic relief is significant as the summit rises approximately 6,870 feet (2,094 m) above the river in 1.8 miles (2.9 km).

== History ==
The name "Yukla" was applied by Walter Curran Mendenhall in 1898 as the Denaʼina name for the Eagle River. "Yuklahina" or "Yukla" means "Eagle River." The mountain's toponym was proposed in 1963 by members of the Mountaineering Club of Alaska, and officially adopted in 1964 by the United States Board on Geographic Names. The first ascent of the summit was made on July 15, 1964, by John Bousman and Arthur Davidson via the East Face and Northeast Ridge.

== Climate ==
Based on the Köppen climate classification, Mount Yukla is located in a tundra climate zone with long, cold, snowy winters, and cool summers. Weather systems coming off the Gulf of Alaska are forced upwards by the Chugach Mountains (orographic lift), causing heavy precipitation in the form of rainfall and snowfall. Winter temperatures can drop below −10 °F with wind chill factors below −20 °F. This climate supports the Icicle Glacier on the east and north slopes.

== See also ==
- List of mountain peaks of Alaska
- Geography of Alaska
