= Suicide peak =

Suicide peak might refer to:

- Suicide Rock, in Southern California
- North Suicide Peak, in Alaska, United States
- South Suicide Peak, in Alaska, United States
