= The Mitre (Alaska) =

Mountain in Alaska

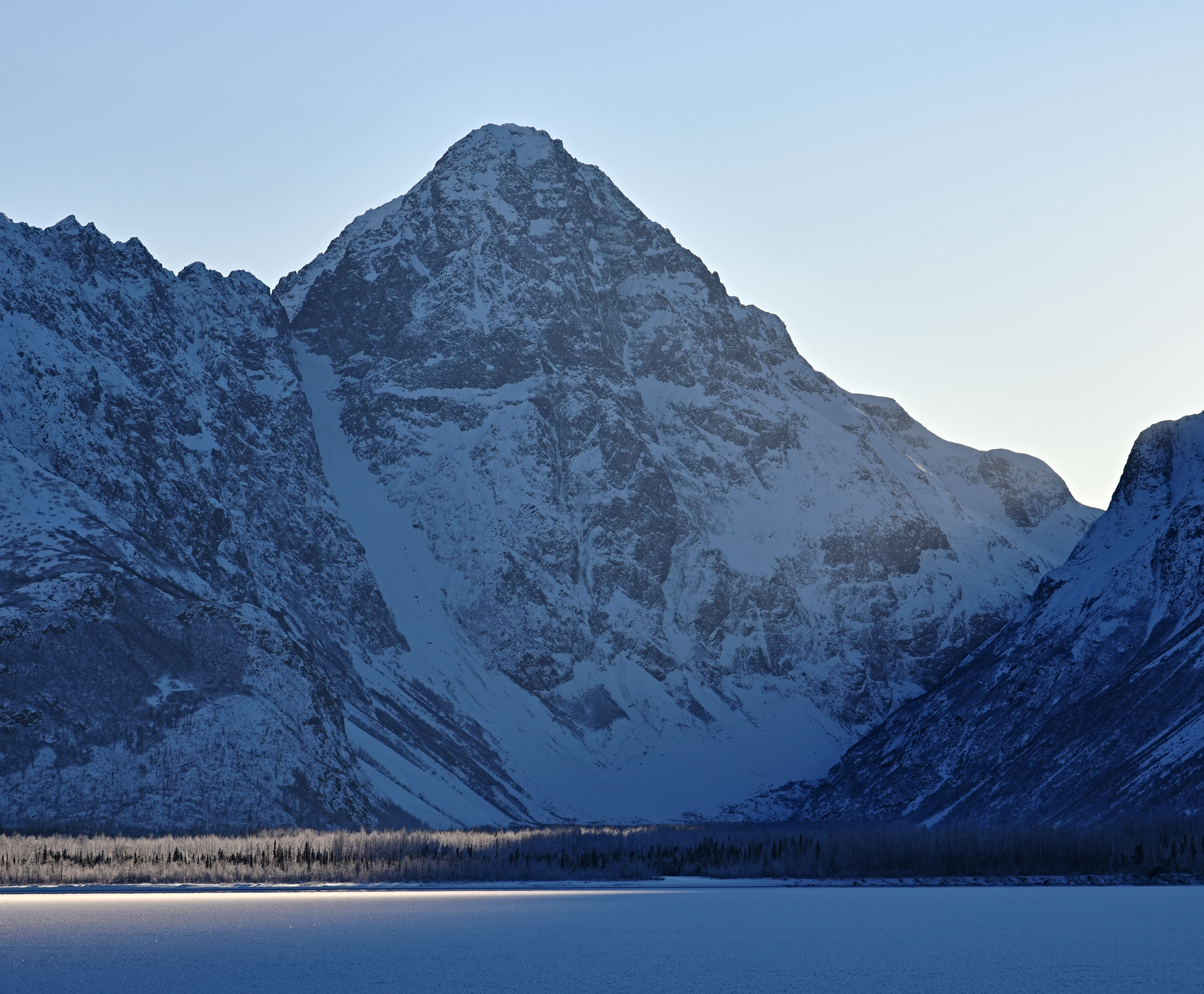
- North aspect of The Mitre from Eklutna Lake

Highest point
- Elevation: 6,651 ft (2,027 m)
- Prominence: 1,751 ft (534 m)
- Parent peak: Benign Peak (7,235 ft)
- Isolation: 2.37 mi (3.81 km)
- Coordinates: 61°15′48″N 148°57′22″W

Geography
- Location within Alaska
- Interactive map of The Mitre
- Country: United States
- State: Alaska
- Borough: Anchorage
- Protected area: Chugach State Park
- Parent range: Chugach Mountains
- Topo map: USGS Anchorage B-6

The Mitre is a 6,651-foot (2,027 m) mountain summit located in the western Chugach Mountains, in Anchorage Municipality in the U.S. state of Alaska. The mountain is situated in Chugach State Park, 30 mi (48 km) east of Anchorage, three miles (4.8 km) northeast of Bellicose Peak, and 5.5 mi (9 km) south-southeast of Eklutna Lake. The nearest higher peak is Benign Peak, 2.4 mi (4 km) to the west-northwest, on the opposite side of the Eklutna Glacier. Although modest in elevation, relief is significant since the western aspect of the mountain rises 4,000 feet above this glacier in approximately half a mile. In Europe, "mitre" is the term used for a sharp, symmetrical rocky peak such as this one. The Mitre's descriptive name was submitted for consideration by the Mountaineering Club of Alaska as suggested by Dr. Rodman Wilson (1921–2003) of Anchorage after he returned from a European vacation. The Mitre name was officially adopted in 1966 by the U.S. Board on Geographic Names. In the Denaʼina language, this mountain is known as Idlu Bena Dghelaya, meaning Mountain of Plural Objects Lake.

== Climate ==
Based on the Köppen climate classification, The Mitre is located in a subarctic climate zone with long, cold, snowy winters, and mild summers. Weather systems coming off the Gulf of Alaska are forced upwards by the Chugach Mountains (orographic lift), causing heavy precipitation in the form of rainfall and snowfall. Winter temperatures can drop below −10 °F with wind chill factors below −20 °F. Precipitation runoff from the peak drains to Cook Inlet via the Eklutna River.

== Gallery ==
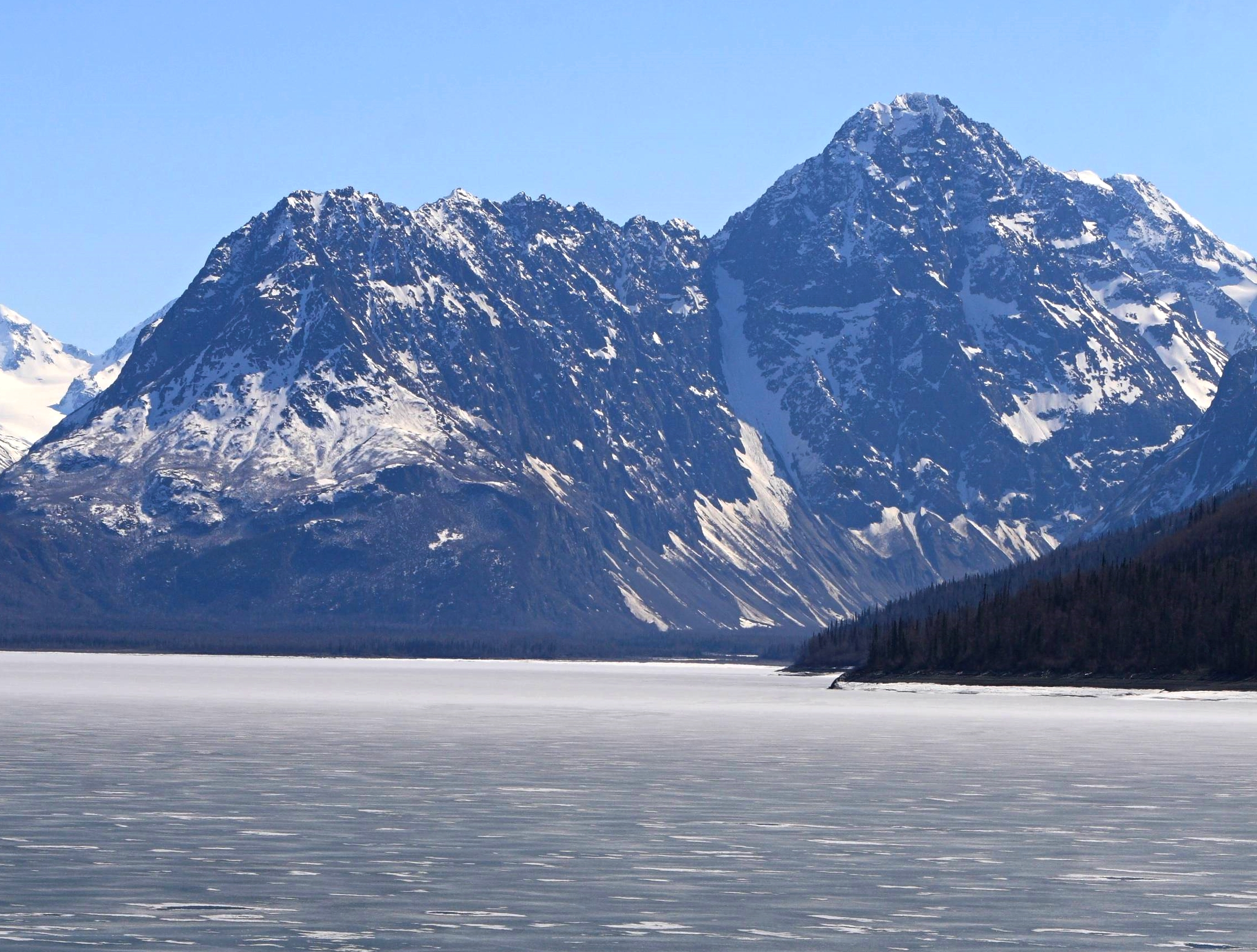

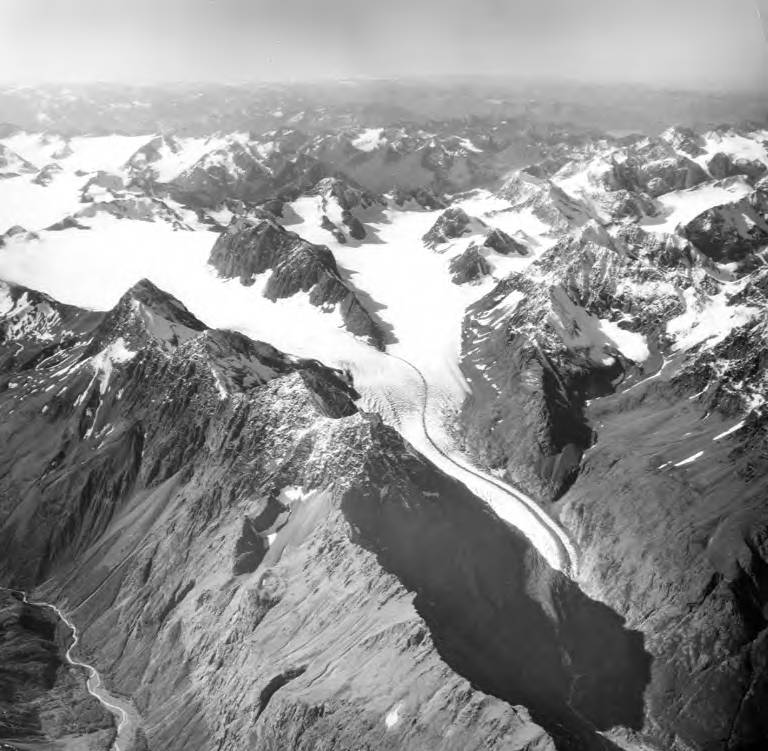
The Mitre in lower left

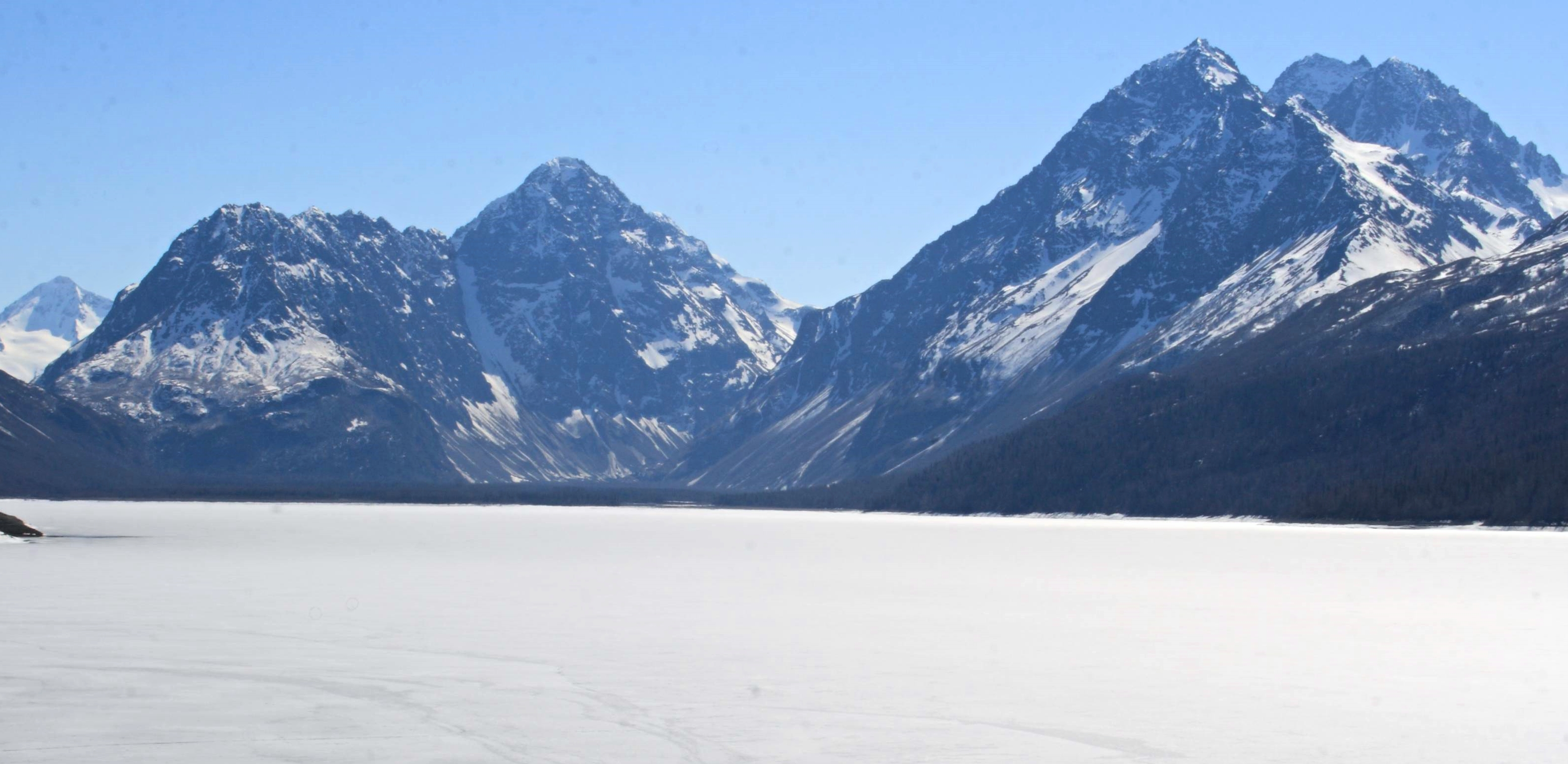
The Mitre and Benign Peak (right) from north

== See also ==
- List of mountain peaks of Alaska
- Geology of Alaska
