= McHugh Peak =

Mountain in Alaska, United States

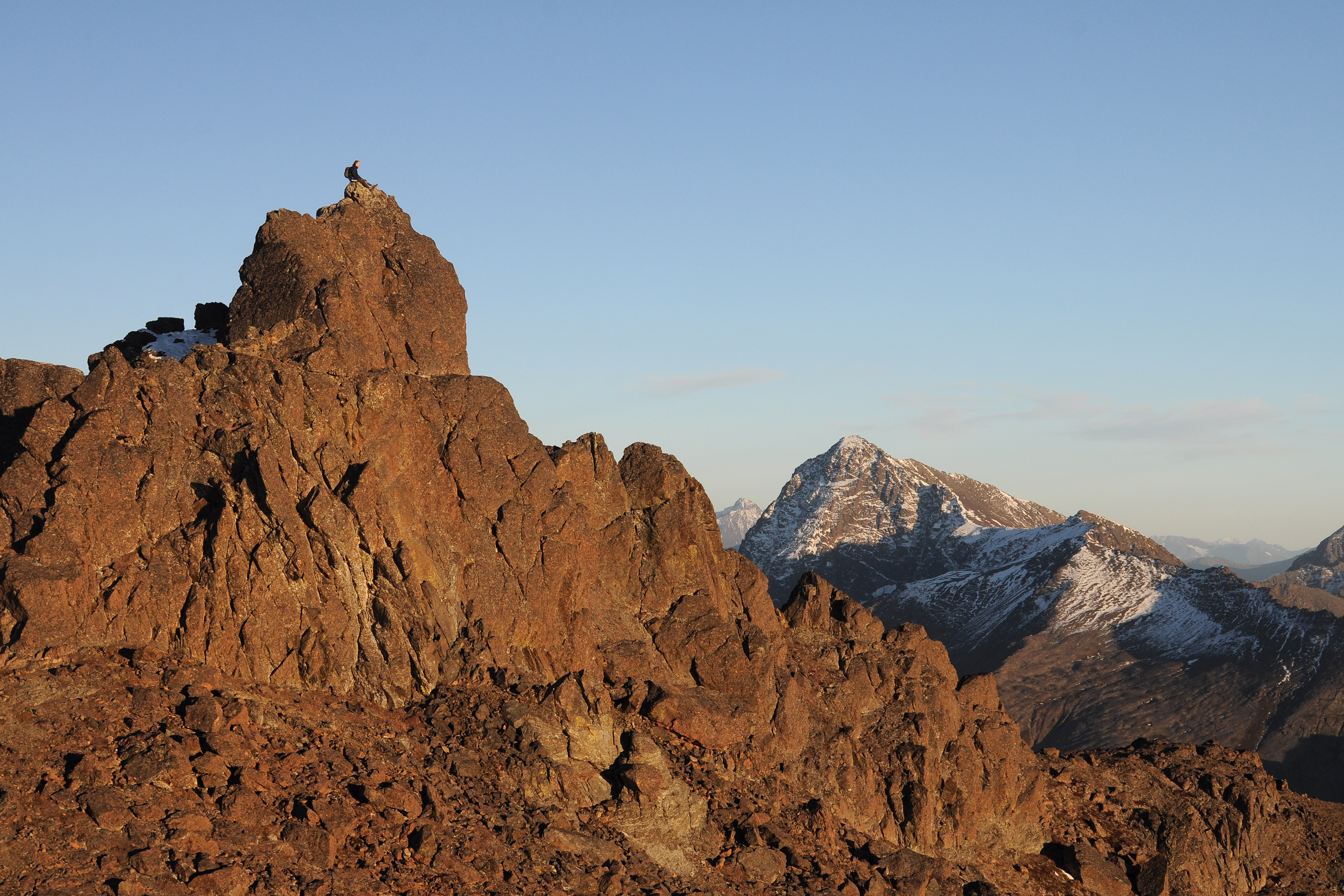
- West aspect of McHugh Peak summit tor (South Suicide Peak in the distance)

Highest point
- Elevation: 4,308 ft (1,313 m)
- Prominence: 1,184 ft (361 m)
- Parent peak: North Suicide Peak
- Isolation: 2.22 mi (3.57 km)
- Coordinates: 61°02′29″N 149°39′59″W

Geography
- Location within Alaska
- Interactive map of McHugh Peak
- Location: Chugach State Park; Anchorage Municipality, Alaska; United States
- Parent range: Chugach Mountains
- Topo map: USGS Anchorage A-8

Climbing
- Easiest route: Scrambling

McHugh Peak is a 4,308-foot (1,313 m) mountain summit located in the western Chugach Mountains, in Anchorage Municipality, in the U.S. state of Alaska. McHugh Peak is situated in Chugach State Park, 14 mi (23 km) southeast of downtown Anchorage, and 5 mi (8 km) southwest of O'Malley Peak. Reaching the top involves hiking on a ridge trail and scrambling the final summit tor. The hike to McHugh Peak is detailed in several popular guidebooks. This geographic feature's local name was reported in 1942 by the Army Map Service, and was officially adopted in 1969 by the U.S. Board on Geographic Names. The mountain's name is derived from McHugh Creek which drains the south slope of this peak, and the creek's name was first published in 1912 by the United States Coast and Geodetic Survey. This mountain is called Q'isqa Dghelaya in the Denaʼina language, meaning Banjo Snowshoe Mountain. "Q'isqa" are temporary snowshoes made of lashed brush.

== Climate ==
Based on the Köppen climate classification, McHugh Peak is located in a subarctic climate zone with long, cold, snowy winters, and mild summers. Temperatures can drop below −20 °C with wind chill factors below −30 °C. Precipitation runoff from the peak drains into McHugh, Potter, and Rabbit Creeks, which empty into Turnagain Arm three miles from the summit.

== Gallery ==
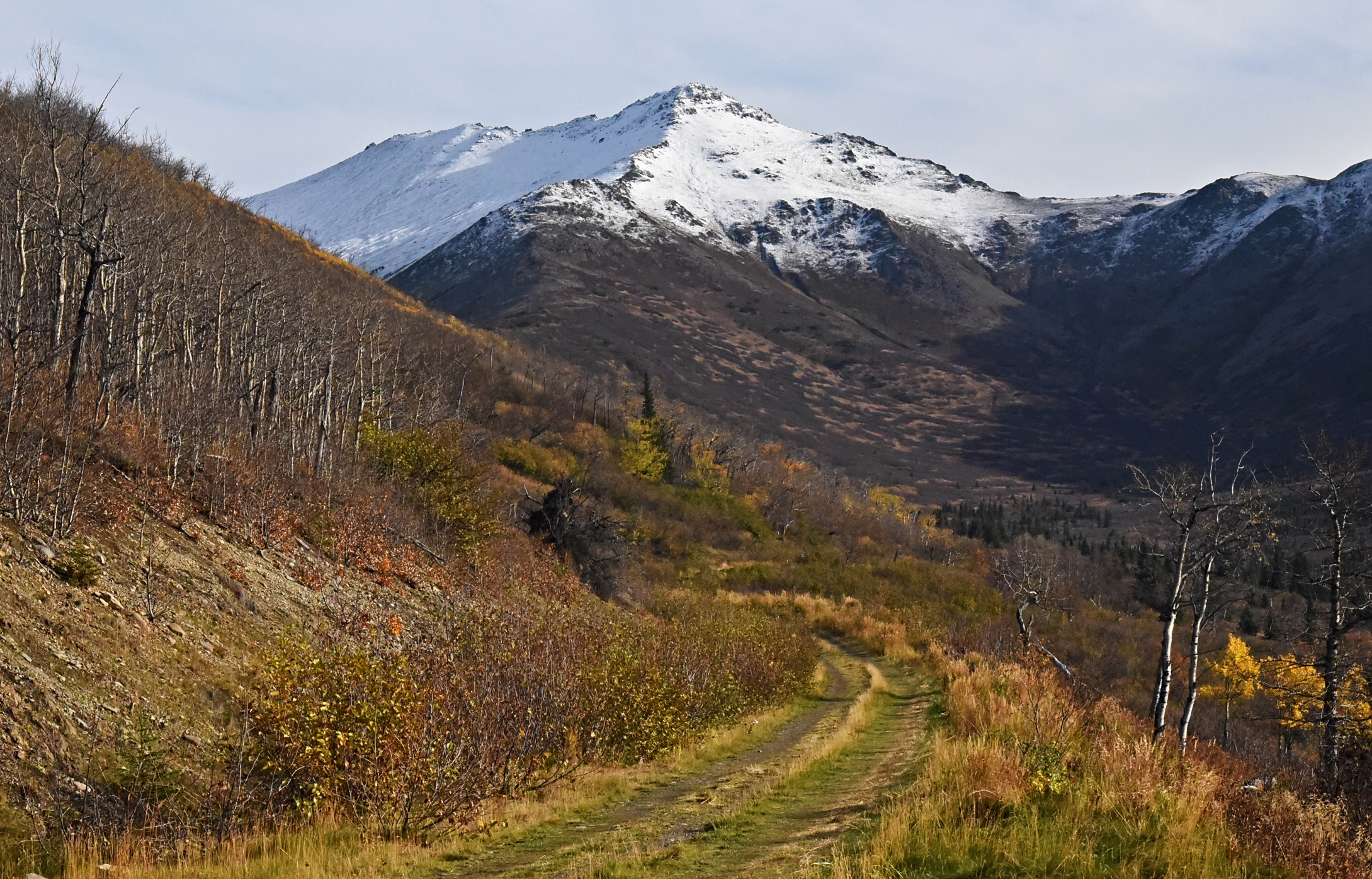
West aspect, summit to left

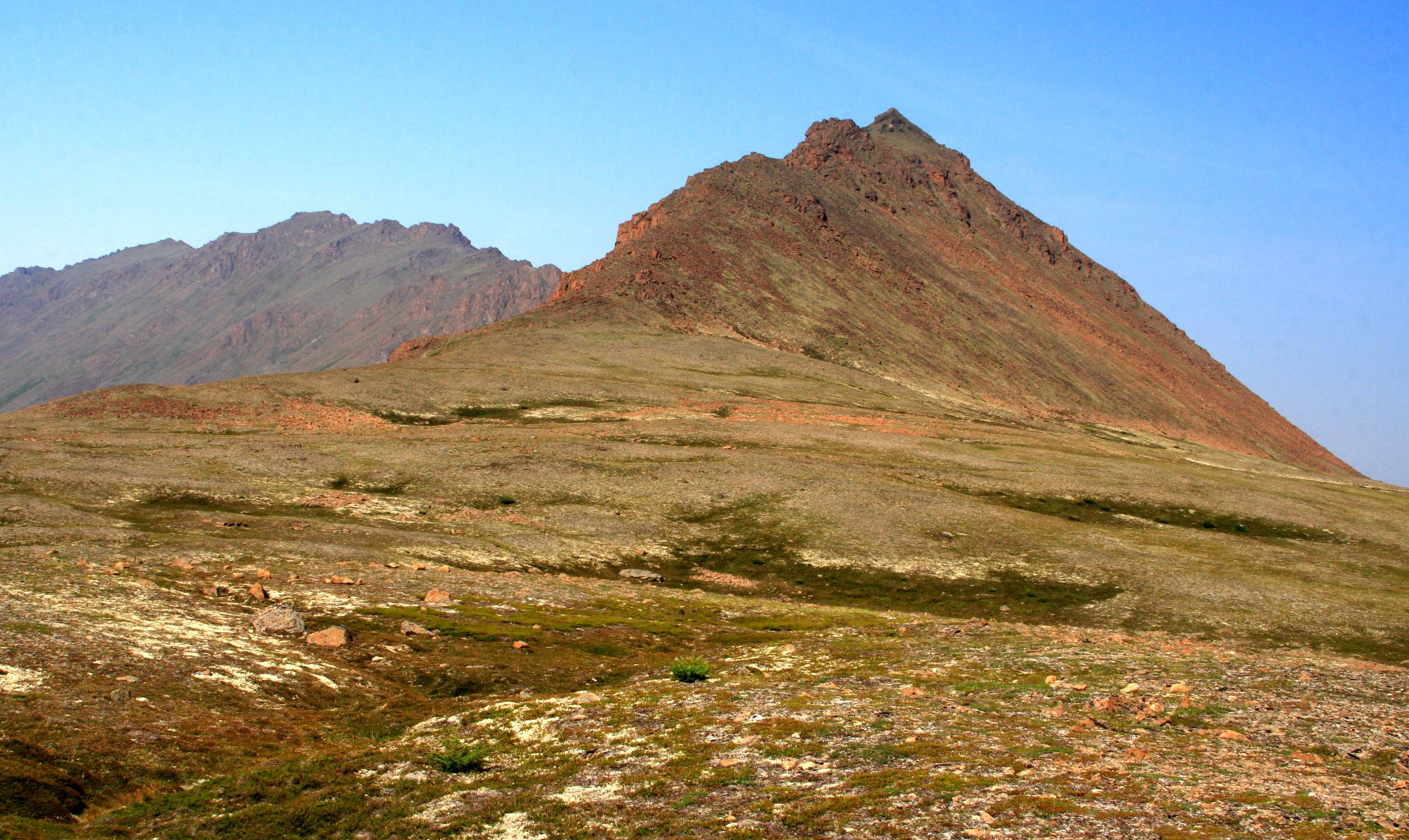

== See also ==
- List of mountain peaks of Alaska
- Geology of Alaska
