= Mount Valhalla =

Mount Valhalla may refer to:

- Mount Valhalla (Antarctica)
- Mount Valhalla (Alaska)
