= Mount Michelson =

Mount Michelson may refer to:

- Mount Michelson (Brooks Range) in the Brooks Range of Alaska, USA
- Mount Michelson (Chugach Mountains) in the Chugach Mountains of Alaska, USA
