= Polar Bear Peak =

Mountain in Alaska, United States

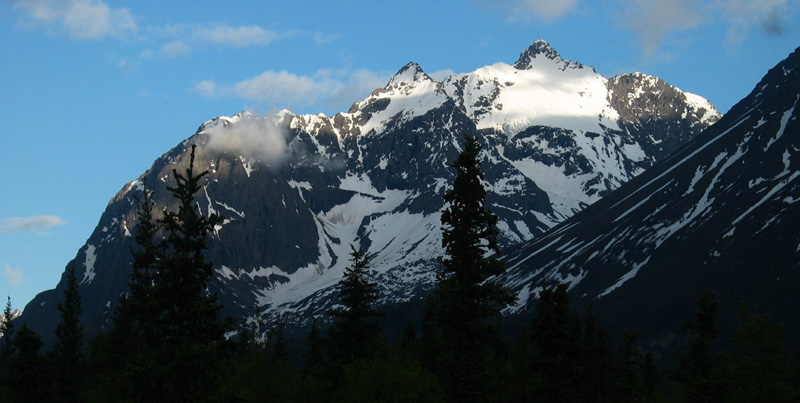
- The North face of Polar Bear Peak

Highest point
- Elevation: 6,614 ft (2,016 m)
- Prominence: 1,214 ft (370 m)
- Coordinates: 61°09′10″N 149°11′45″W

Geography
- Location within Alaska
- Location: Municipality of Anchorage, Alaska, U.S.
- Parent range: Chugach Mountains
- Topo map: USGS Anchorage A-6

Climbing
- First ascent: 1966; Vin Hoeman, C. Serfoss

Polar Bear Peak is a 6,614-foot (2,016 m) mountain in the U.S. state of Alaska, located in Chugach State Park. Situated in the Chugach Mountains, it lies at the head of South Fork Eagle River, 5 mi (8.0 km) ESE of Eagle Lake, and 22 miles (35 km) ESE of downtown Anchorage. The peak was named in 1963 by members of the Mountaineering Club of Alaska because a snow patch on its north face resembles a Polar bear skin.

== Terrain ==
Beginning at approximately 1000 ft., Polar Bear Peak becomes a predominantly alpine zone, characterized by exposed rock, extremely scant vegetation, a variety of lichens, and snow pack (including year-round snowfields and glaciers).

== Wildlife ==
Like many Alaskan mountains, Polar Bear Peak may be frequented by rock ptarmigan, Dall sheep, mountain goats, and other alpine animals. Despite the lack of vegetation, a variety of insects thrive at high elevations throughout Alaska. Overhead, one may spot a hawk or eagle.
