= Mount Rumble =

Mountain in Alaska, U.S.

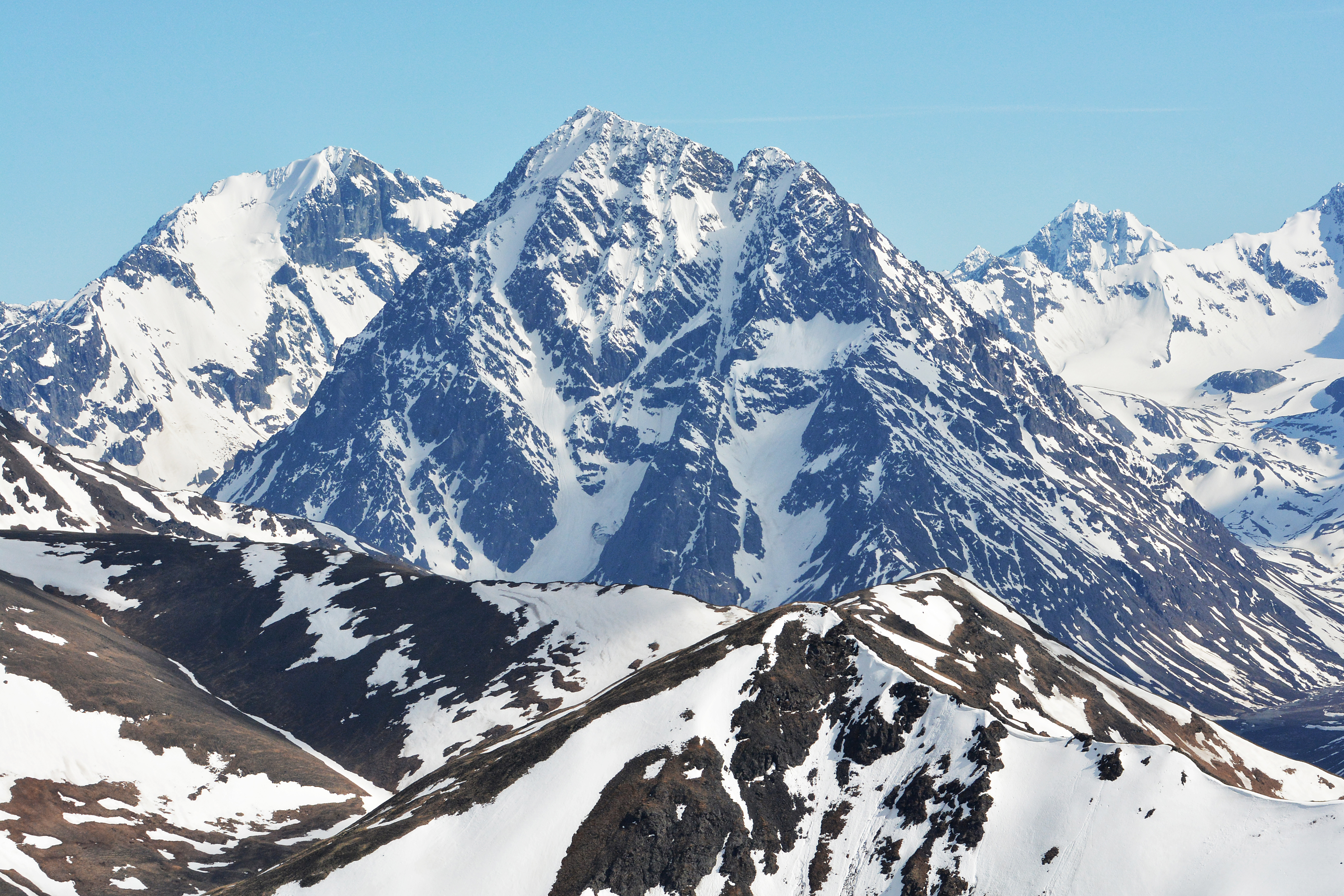
- Mt. Rumble centered, Bellicose Peak behind left

Highest point
- Elevation: 7,530 ft (2,300 m)
- Prominence: 2,430 ft (740 m)
- Parent peak: Bellicose Peak
- Listing: List of mountain peaks of Alaska
- Coordinates: 61°15′23″N 149°04′45″W

Geography
- Location within Alaska
- Location: Chugach State Park; Anchorage Municipality, Alaska; United States
- Parent range: Chugach Mountains
- Topo map: USGS Anchorage B-6

Climbing
- Easiest route: Scrambling

Mount Rumble is a 7,530-foot (2,295 m) mountain summit located in the Chugach Mountains, in Anchorage Municipality in the U.S. state of Alaska. The peak is situated in Chugach State Park at the head of Peters Creek Valley, 24 mi (39 km) east of downtown Anchorage, and 3 mi (5 km) west of Eklutna Glacier. On a clear day the peak can be seen from the George Parks Highway.

== Climate ==
Based on the Köppen climate classification, Mount Rumble is located in a subarctic climate zone with long, cold, snowy winters, and mild summers. Weather systems coming off the Gulf of Alaska are forced upwards by the Chugach Mountains (orographic lift), causing heavy precipitation in the form of rainfall and snowfall. Temperatures can drop below −20 °C with wind chill factors below −30 °C. Precipitation runoff from the peak drains into Peters Creek.

== Gallery ==
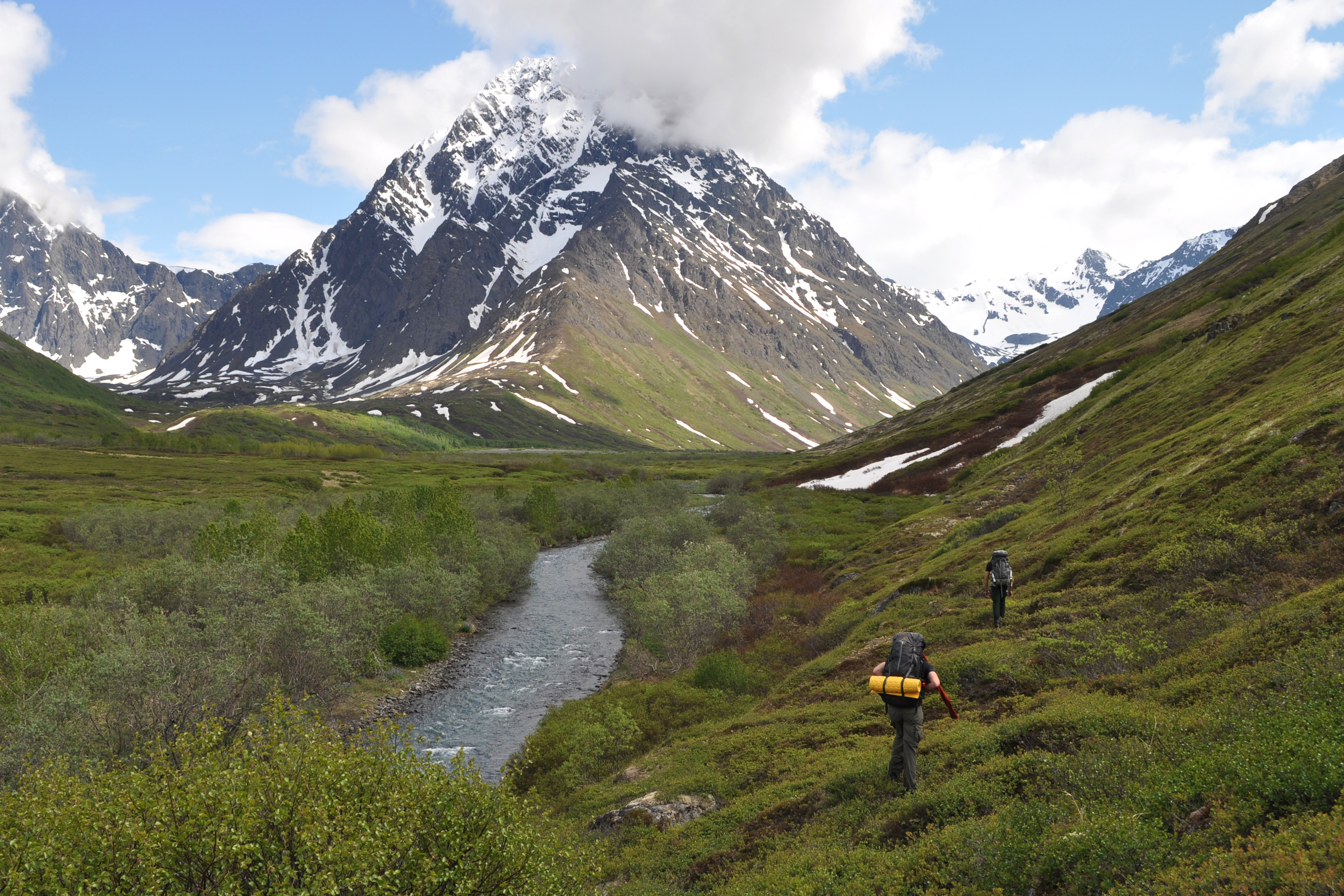
Peters Creek valley and Mt. Rumble

== See also ==
- Geology of Alaska
