= Byron Peak =

Mountain in Alaska, United States

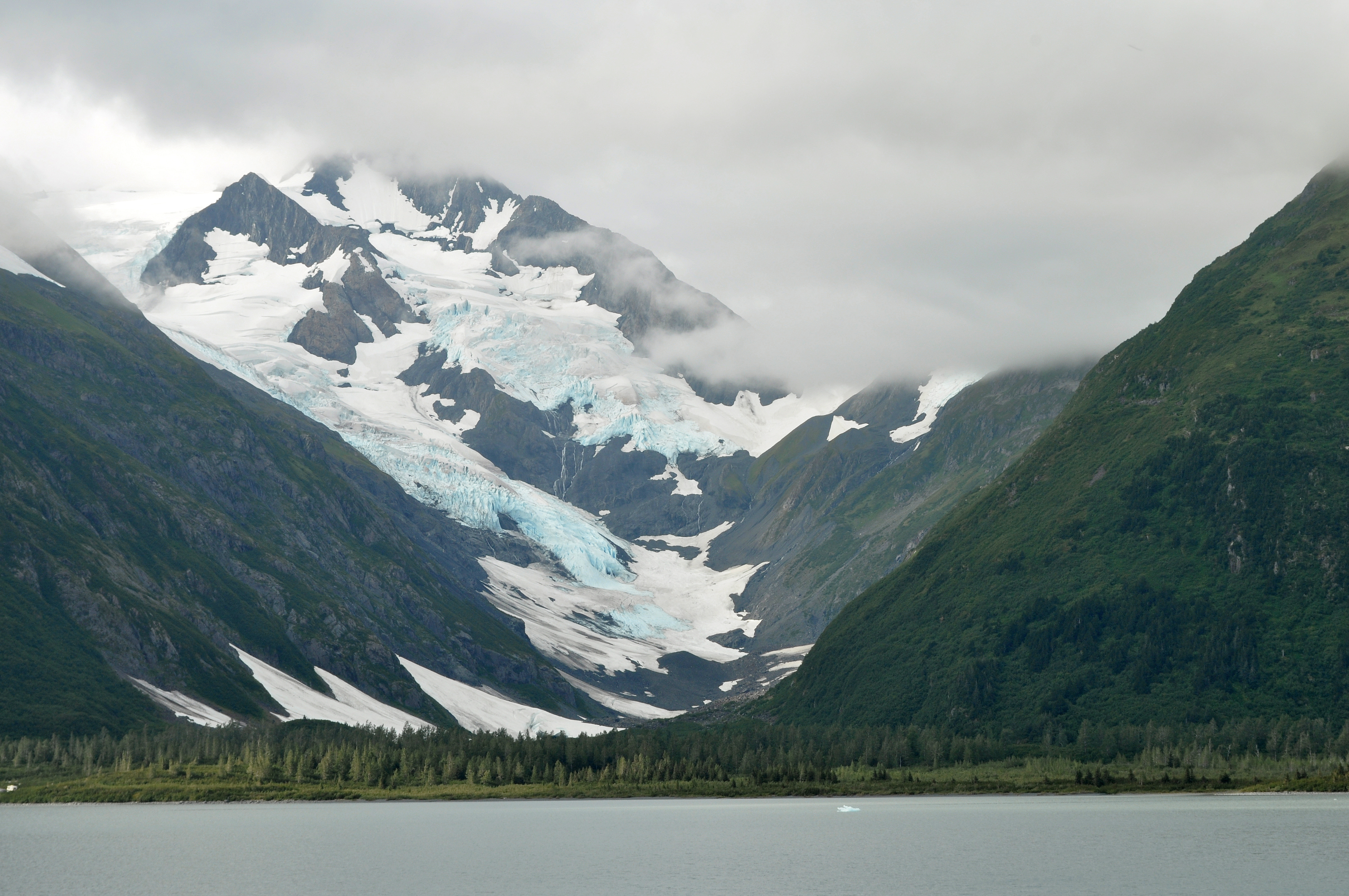
- Byron Peak rises above Portage Lake

Highest point
- Elevation: 4,590 ft (1,400 m)
- Prominence: Approximately 1,000 feet (300 m)
- Coordinates: 60°43′36″N 148°51′36″W

Geography
- Location within Alaska
- Interactive map of Byron Peak
- Location: Chugach National Forest
- Parent range: Chugach Mountains

Climbing
- Easiest route: Byron Peak is typically climbed from the north

Byron Peak is a 4,590-foot-high (1,400-metre) mountain in the U.S. state of Alaska, located in Chugach National Forest.

== Location ==
Byron Peak is located in the Chugach National Forest at the head of a short, steep-walled valley, and rises above Portage Lake.

== Outdoor Recreation ==
Due to relative ease of access and proximity to the major population centers of Alaska, Byron Peak and the surrounding area is a popular destination for mountain climbers, hikers, and, occasionally, skiers. The Byron Glacier Trail is a short and easy walk to the base of Byron Peak, and offers visitors panoramic views of steep glaciated mountains and Portage Lake. Continuing upward from the floor of the valley toward the peak requires technical skill and climbing equipment.

== Accidents and Fatalities ==
Byron Peak has been the site of several tragic accidents.

- September 2006; one climber killed in a fall into a glacial crevasse
- February 2004; one climber killed in a cornice break avalanche near the summit
- August 1996; one young climber, the daughter of a well-known leader in Alaska's outdoor community, killed in a fall

== Gallery ==
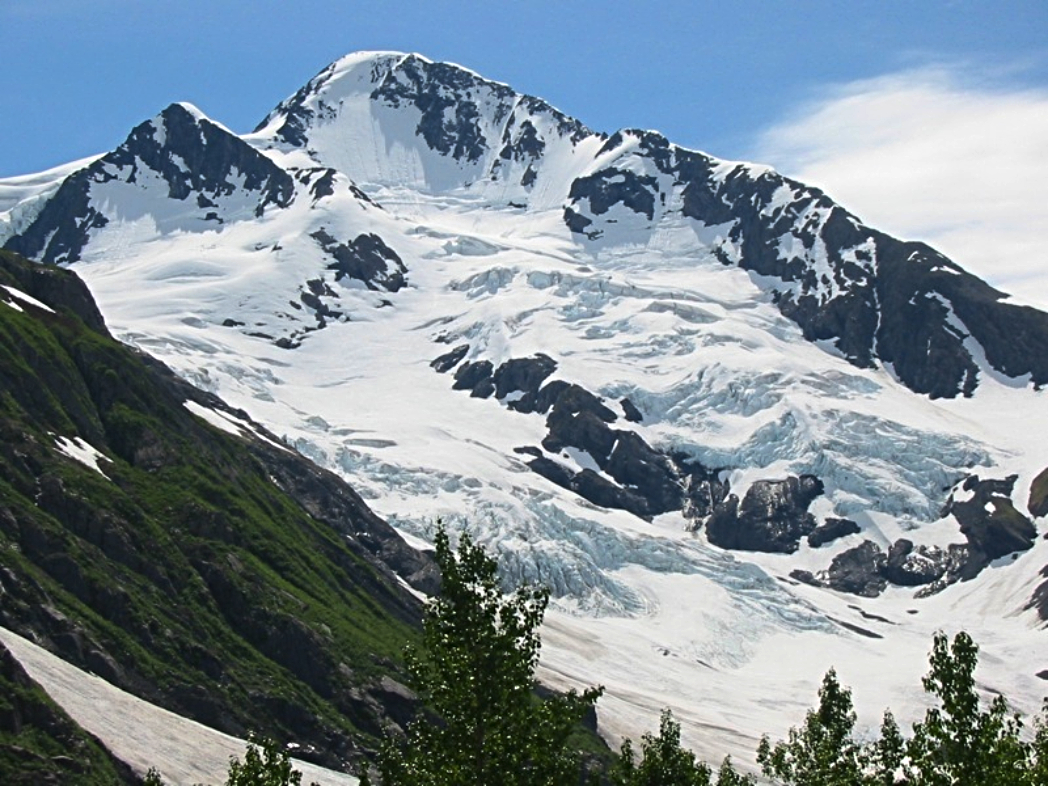
Byron Peak
