= Mount Thor (Alaska) =

Peak in Alaska, U.S.

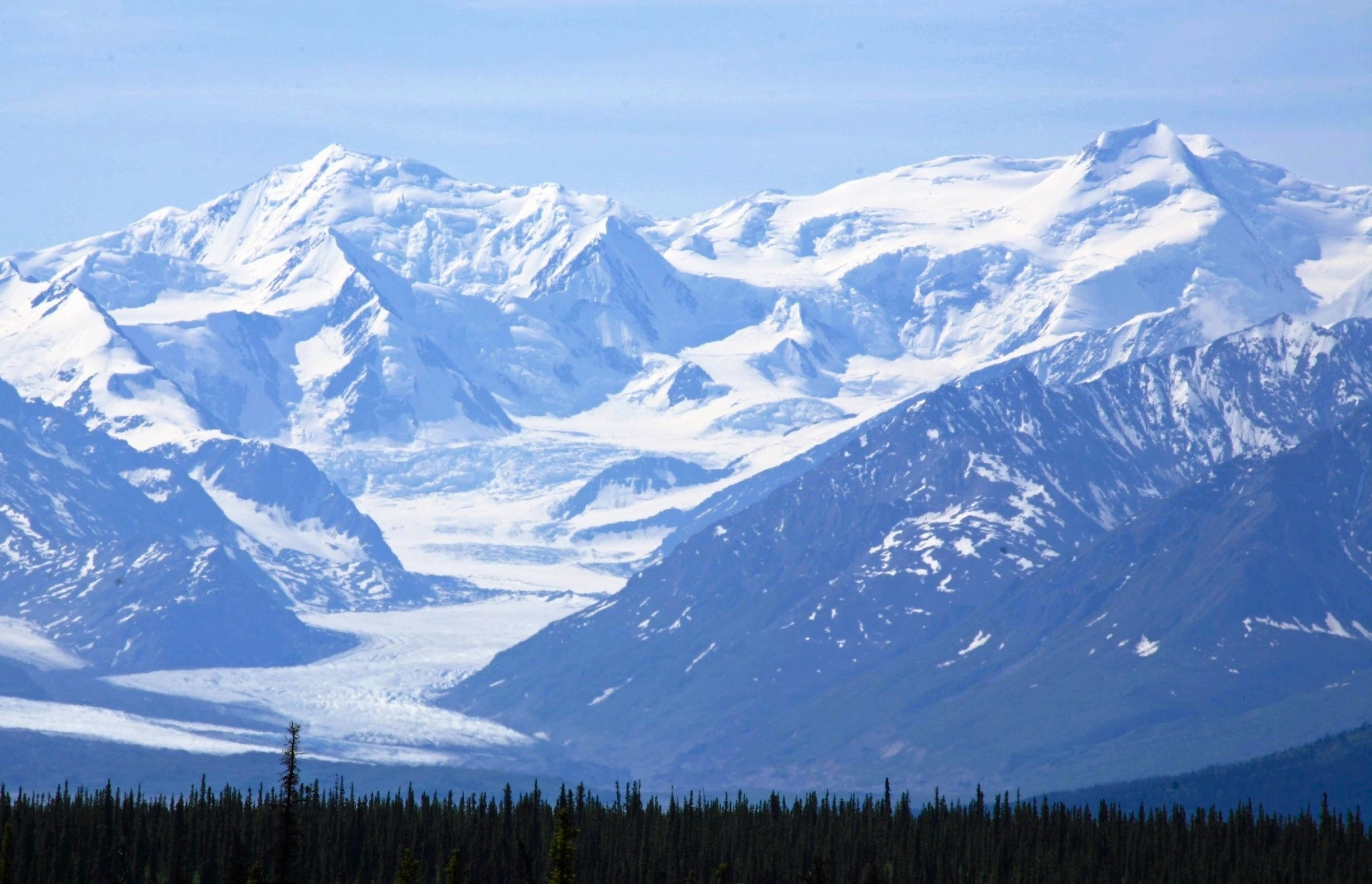
- North aspect of Thor to right (Mt. Valhalla to left)

Highest point
- Elevation: 12,521 ft (3,816 m)
- Prominence: 3,250 ft (991 m)
- Isolation: 19.69 mi (31.69 km)
- Coordinates: 61°29′07″N 147°08′46″W

Geography
- Location within Alaska
- Country: United States
- State: Alaska
- Borough: Matanuska-Susitna
- Protected area: Chugach National Forest
- Parent range: Chugach Mountains
- Topo map: USGS Anchorage B-1 Quadrangle

Climbing
- First ascent: 1968 by Vin Hoeman, Winford Bludworth and Harry Bludworth

Mount Thor (12,251 ft) is the second-highest peak of the Chugach Mountains in Alaska. It is named after Thor, Norse god of thunder, because of the noise of avalanches on this mountain. The mountain's toponym was officially adopted in 1969 by the United States Board on Geographic Names.

== Climate ==
Based on the Köppen climate classification, Mount Thor is located in a tundra climate zone with long, cold, snowy winters, and cool summers. Weather systems coming off the Gulf of Alaska are forced upwards by the Chugach Mountains (orographic lift), causing heavy precipitation in the form of rainfall and snowfall. Winter temperatures can drop below −10 °F with wind chill factors below −20 °F.
