= Mount Palmer (Alaska) =

Mountain in Alaska, United States

- Location within Alaska

Highest point
- Elevation: 6,940 ft (2,115 m)
- Coordinates: 61°19′09″N 148°39′28″W

Geography
- Location: Municipality of Anchorage, Alaska, U.S.
- Parent range: Chugach Mountains
- Topo map: USGS Anchorage B-5

Climbing
- First ascent: 1970 by Grace Hoeman

Mount Palmer is a 6,940-foot (2,115 m) mountain in the Chugach Mountains in the U.S. state of Alaska. It is located within the Municipality of Anchorage.

It is named in honor of George W. Palmer, a trader who operated a store near this area in the early 1900s.
