= Mount Valhalla (Alaska) =

Mountain in Alaska, United States

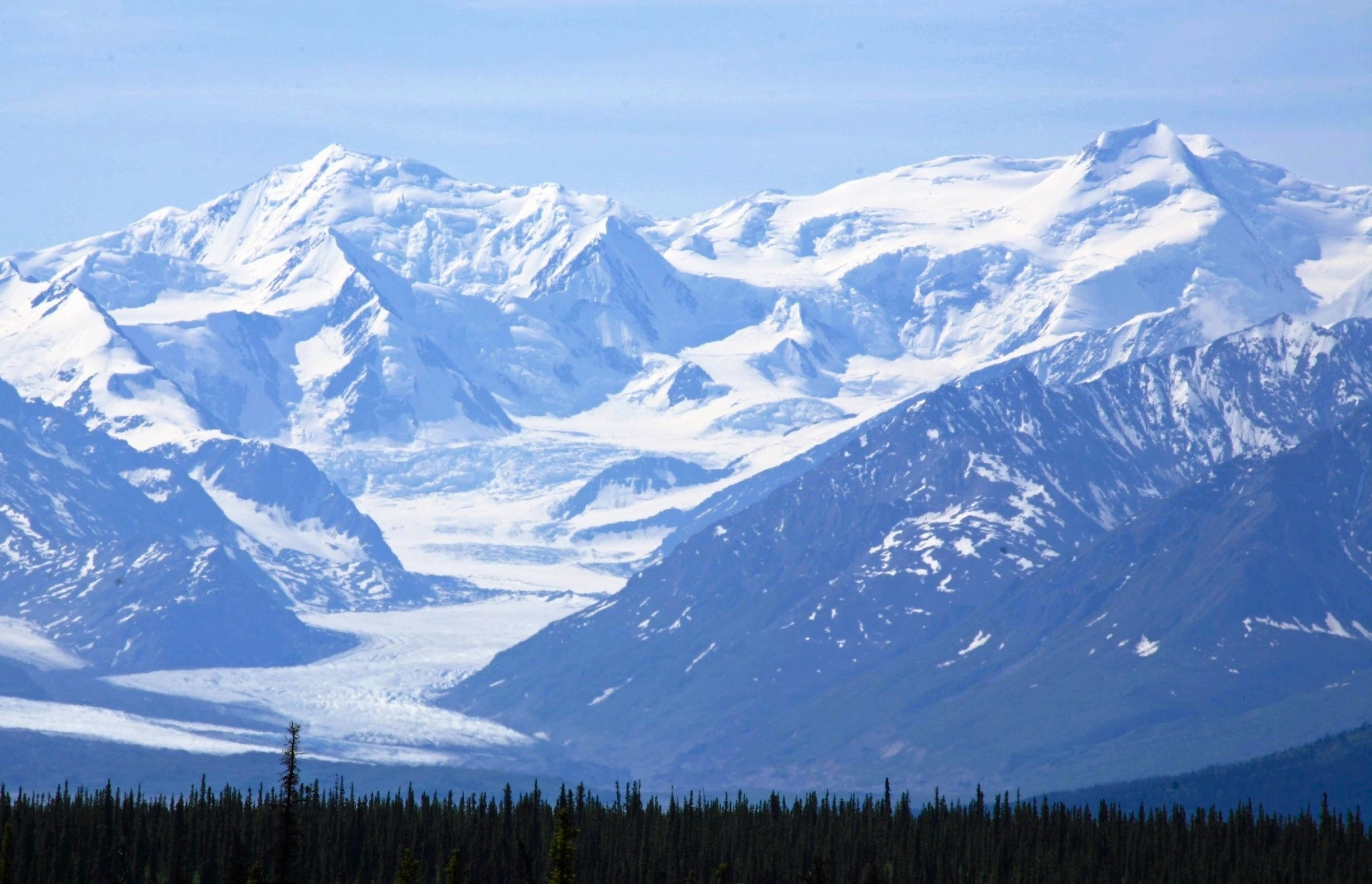
- North aspect of Mt. Valhalla to left (Mt. Thor to right)

Highest point
- Elevation: 12,135 ft (3,699 m)
- Prominence: 1,085 ft (331 m)
- Coordinates: 61°27′36″N 147°04′49″W

Geography
- Location within Alaska
- Country: United States
- State: Alaska
- Census Area: Copper River
- Protected area: Chugach National Forest
- Parent range: Chugach Mountains
- Topo map: USGS Anchorage B-1

Climbing
- First ascent: 1957 by Lawrence E. Nielsen

Mount Valhalla, elevation (12,135 ft), is a glaciated summit located 34 mi (55 km) northwest of Valdez in the Chugach Mountains of the U.S. state of Alaska. It's set on land managed by Chugach National Forest. This remote mountain, fourth-highest in the Chugach range, is situated 6 mi (10 km) northeast of Mount Witherspoon, and 7.1 mi (11 km) north of Mount Einstein. It is named after Valhalla, the seat of the gods in Norse mythology. The mountain was named in 1957 by Lawrence E. Nielsen because the peak is "a fitting throne of the gods." Nielsen was a member of the first ascent party on July 1, 1957. The mountain's toponym was officially adopted in 1965 by the U.S. Board on Geographic Names.

== Climate ==
Based on the Köppen climate classification, Mount Valhalla is located in a subarctic climate zone with long, cold, snowy winters, and mild summers. Weather systems coming off the Gulf of Alaska are forced upwards by the Chugach Mountains (orographic lift), causing heavy precipitation in the form of rainfall and snowfall. Winter temperatures can drop below −20 °C with wind chill factors below −30 °C. This climate supports the Harvard, Nelchina, and Columbia Glaciers surrounding this mountain. The months May through June offer the most favorable weather for climbing or viewing.

== See also ==
- List of mountain peaks of Alaska
- Geography of Alaska
