= Mount Michelson (Chugach Mountains) =

Mountain in Alaska, United States

- Location within Alaska

Highest point
- Elevation: 8,701 ft (2,652 m)
- Coordinates: 61°16′50″N 147°13′28″W

Geography
- Location: Valdez-Cordova Census Area, Alaska
- Parent range: Chugach Mountains
- Topo map: USGS Anchorage B-1

Mount Michelson is a mountain at the head of the Meares Glacier, 34 miles (55 km) NW of Valdez in the Chugach Mountains of Alaska, USA. The mountain was named around 1957 for Albert Abraham Michelson by members of the Chugach Mountains Expedition sponsored by the Arctic Institute of North America.
