= South Yuyanq' Ch'ex =

Mountain in Alaska, USA

South Yuyanq’ Ch’ex
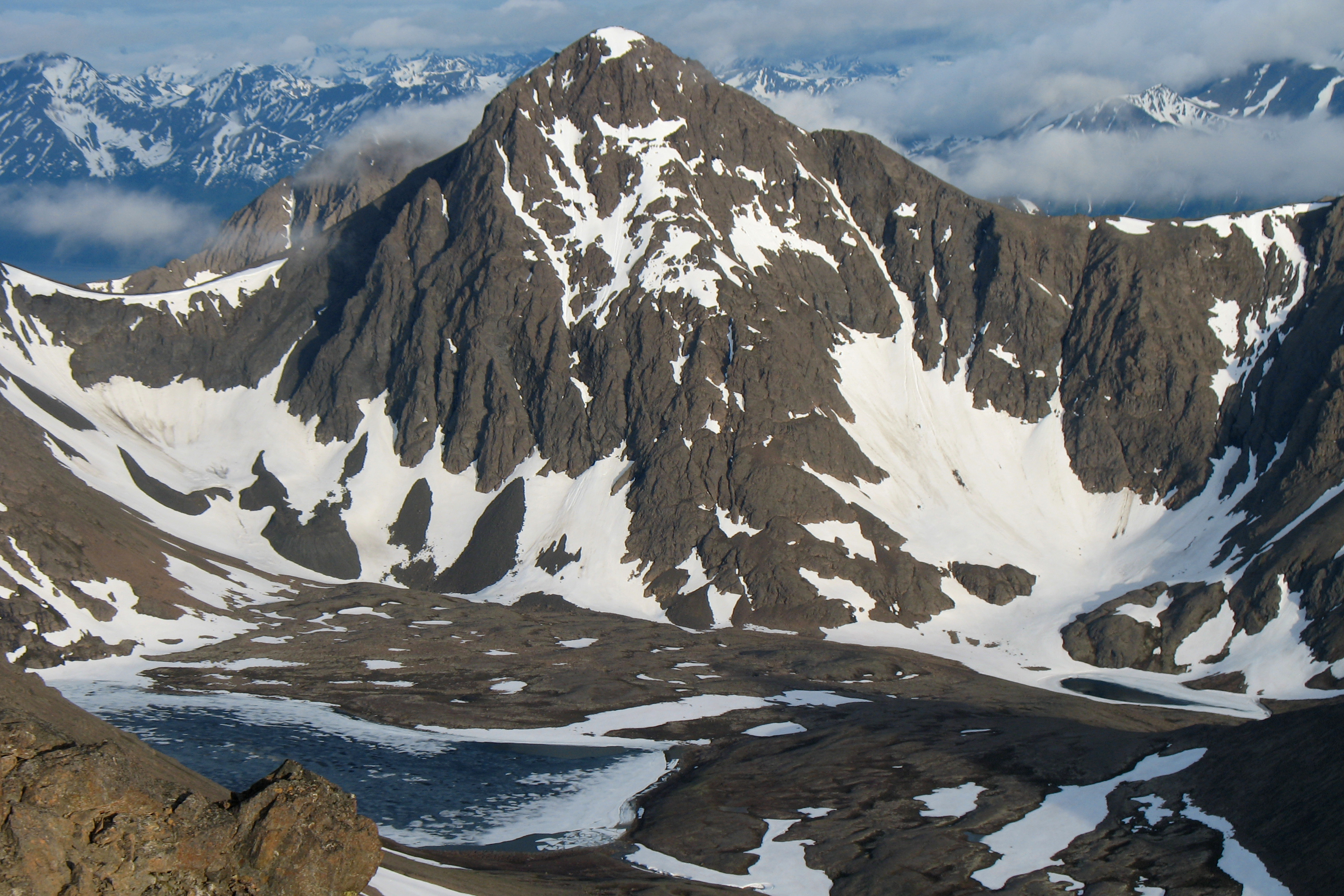
- South Yuyanq’ Ch’ex, as seen from nearby Ptarmigan Peak

Highest point
- Elevation: 5,005 ft (1,526 m)
- Prominence: 1,004 ft (306 m)
- Coordinates: 61°01′47″N 149°34′29″W

Geography
- Location within Alaska
- Location: Chugach State Park, Alaska, U.S.
- Parent range: Chugach Mountains

Climbing
- Easiest route: Most often climbed via Hauser's Gully

South Yuyanq’ Ch’ex (formerly South Suicide Peak) is a 5,005-foot (1,526 m) mountain in the U.S. state of Alaska, located in Chugach State Park. The peak is notable for its graceful pyramidal shape and symmetry with nearby North Yuyanq’ Ch’ex, and as the tallest mountain rising from the North side of Cook Inlet's Turnagain Arm.

== Location ==
South Yuyanq’ Ch’ex is located on the southern edge of Chugach State Park, in Alaska, and is positioned between North Yuyanq’ Ch’ex, Indianhouse Mountain, Rabbit Lake, and McHugh Peak.

== Outdoor Recreation and Climbing Routes ==
Due to its location near Anchorage, Alaska and ease of access from multiple trailheads, South Yuyanq’ Ch’ex is a relatively popular climbing destination. It is considered a non-technical, but rigorous, one-day climb when free of snow.

South Yuyanq’ Ch’ex is most often climbed via the following routes:

- Via Hauser's gully on the northern face, which ascends steeply from the moraines between North and South Yuyanq’ Ch’ex, adjacent to Rabbit Lake
- Via the Windy Gap pass between North Yuyanq’ Ch’ex and South Yuyanq’ Ch’ex
- From the South side and ridge via the Falls Creek trailhead
- Via the western ridge, accessed either from Rainbow Peak or from the upper McHugh Creek trail.
