= North Yuyanq' Ch'ex =

Mountain in Alaska, USA

North Yuyanq’ Ch’ex
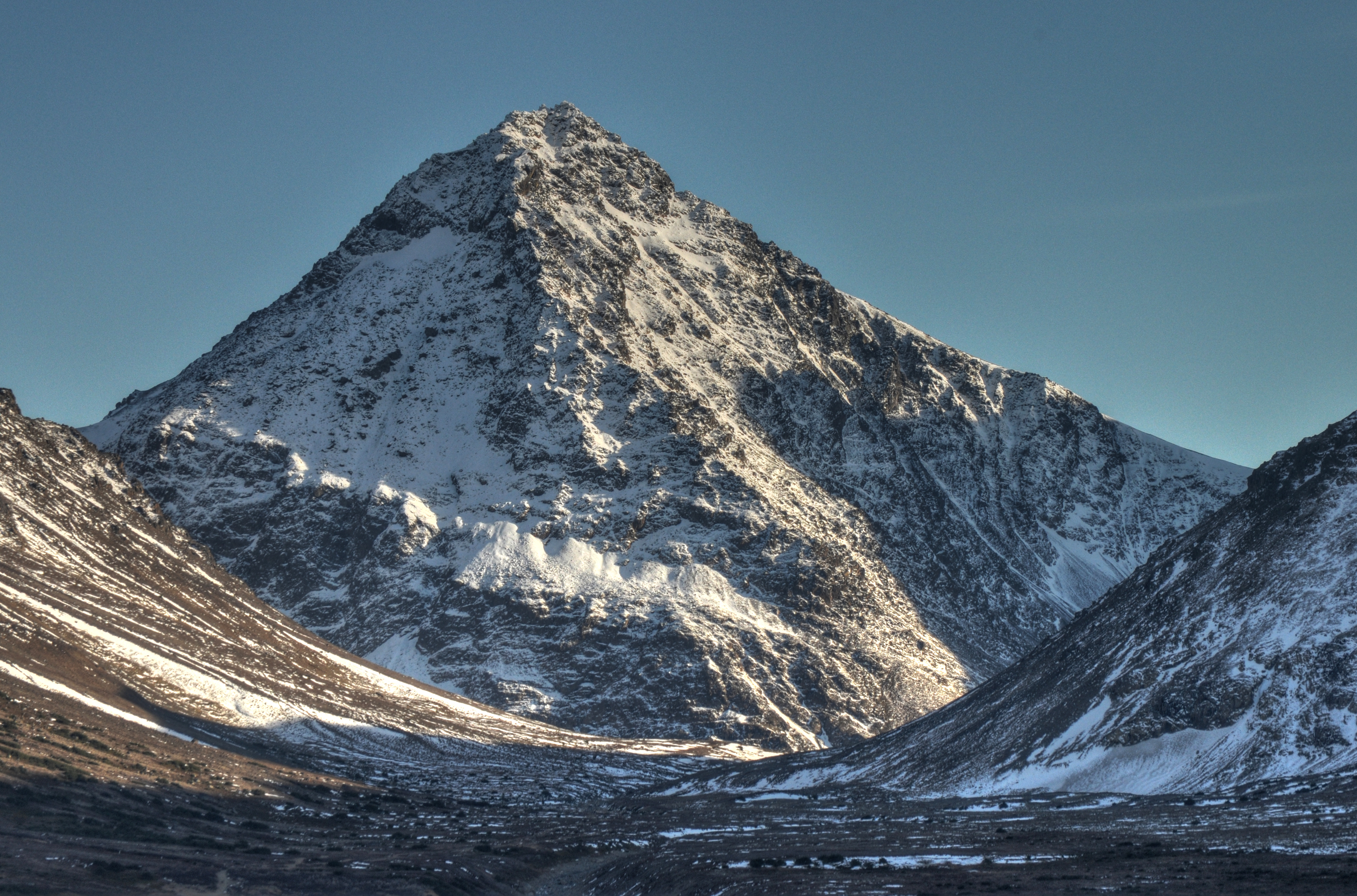
- North Yuyanq’ Ch’ex as seen from the West, from a shoulder of nearby McHugh Peak

Highest point
- Elevation: 5,065 ft (1,544 m)
- Prominence: 1,465 ft (447 m)
- Coordinates: 61°02′12″N 149°33′37″W

Geography
- Location within Alaska
- Location: Chugach State Park, Alaska, U.S.
- Parent range: Chugach Mountains

Climbing
- Easiest route: Most often climbed via Hauser's Gully on South Yuyanq’ Ch’ex

North Yuyanq’ Ch’ex (formerly North Suicide Peak) is a 5,065 feet (1,544 m) mountain in the U.S. state of Alaska, located in Chugach State Park.

== Location ==
North Yuyanq’ Ch’ex is located on the southern edge of Chugach State Park, in Alaska, and is positioned between South Yuyanq’ Ch’ex, Homicide Peak, Avalanche Peak, and Rabbit Lake.

== Access and recreation ==
North Yuyanq’ Ch’ex is accessible via the popular Falls Creek, McHugh Creek, and Rabbit Lake trails. In the summer months, it is a rugged but non-technical climb that is typically completed as a day trip from nearby Anchorage, Alaska. The peak can be climbed in all seasons but is most popular in the summer and fall, when the majority of the mountain is snow-free.
