= Bellicose Peak =

Mountain in Alaska

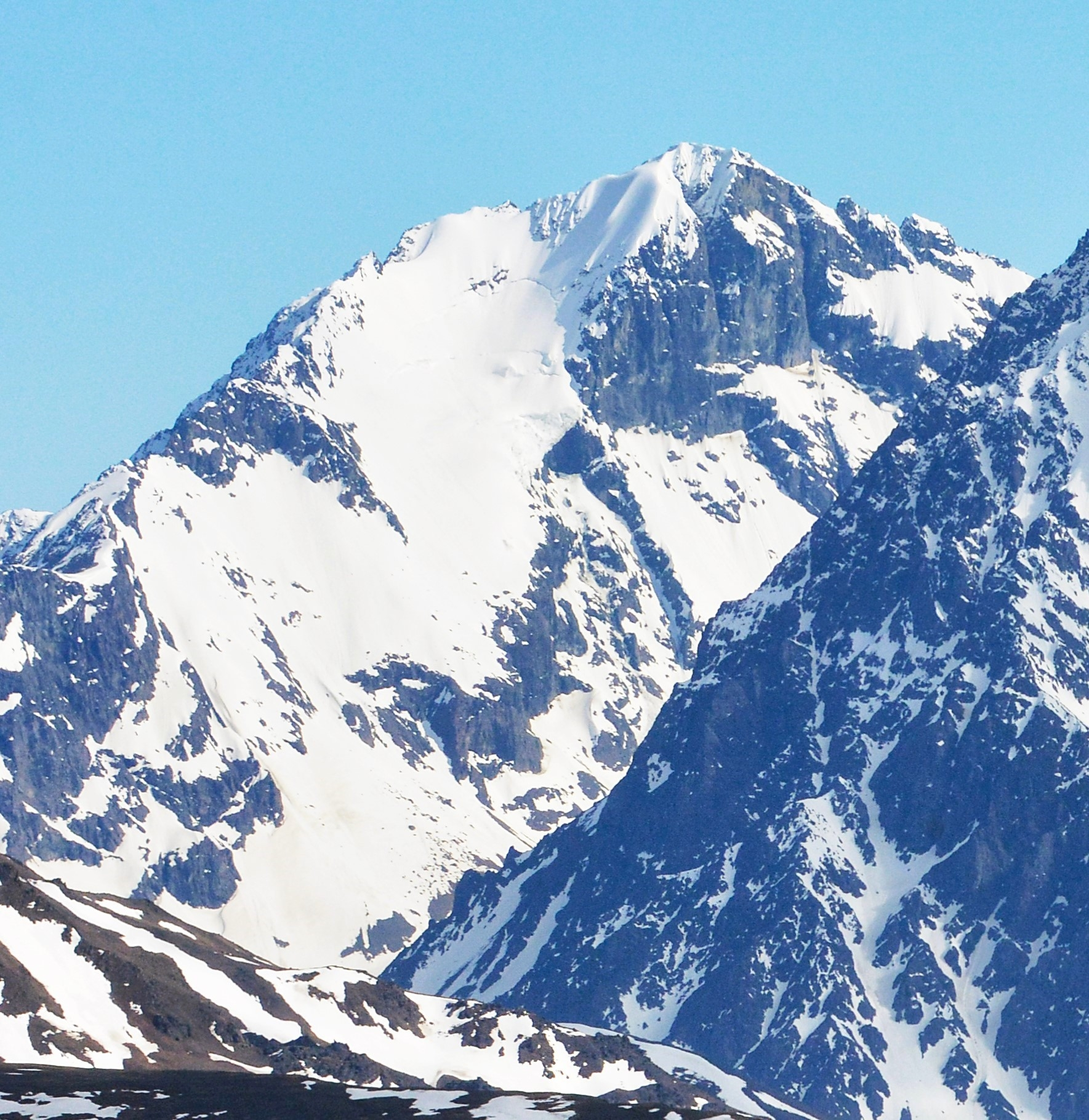
- Northwest aspect

Highest point
- Elevation: 7,640 ft (2,329 m)
- Prominence: 2,582 ft (787 m)
- Parent peak: Bashful Peak (8,005 ft)
- Isolation: 7.13 mi (11.47 km)
- Coordinates: 61°14′29″N 149°02′01″W

Naming
- Etymology: Bellicose

Geography
- Location within Alaska
- Interactive map of Bellicose Peak
- Country: United States
- State: Alaska
- Borough: Anchorage
- Protected area: Chugach State Park
- Parent range: Chugach Mountains
- Topo map: USGS Anchorage A-6

Climbing
- First ascent: 1963

Bellicose Peak is a 7,640-foot (2,329 m) mountain summit in Alaska, United States.

== Description ==
Bellicose Peak is located 28 miles (45 km) east of Anchorage in the western Chugach Mountains. It ranks as the third-highest peak within Chugach State Park. Precipitation runoff from the mountain drains to Knik Arm via Peters Creek and the Eklutna River. Although modest in elevation, topographic relief is significant as the summit rises approximately 4,640 feet (1,414 m) above Peters Creek in two miles (3.2 km) and 3,640 feet (1,110 m) above the Eklutna Glacier in less than one mile.

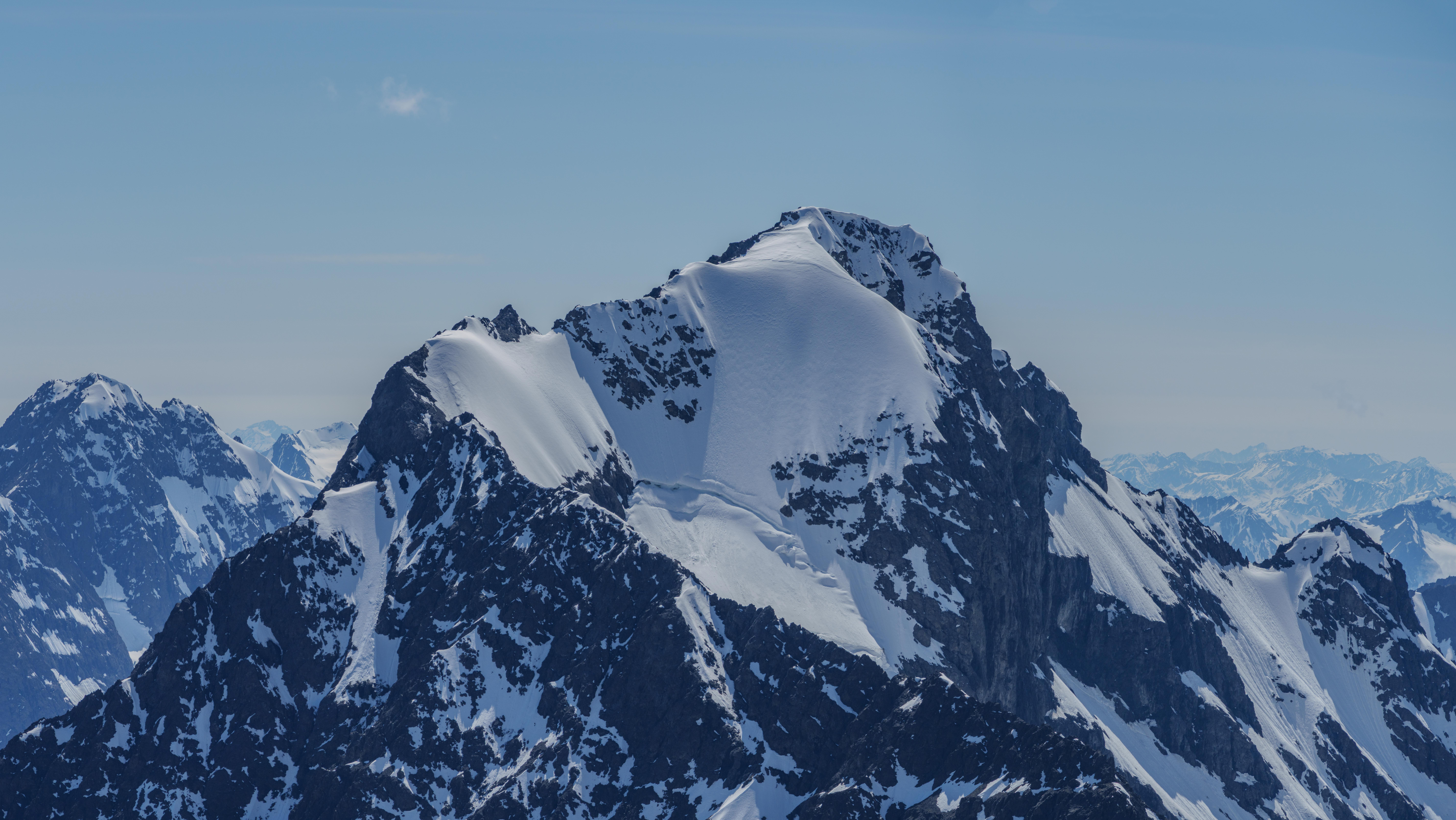

== History ==
The first ascent of the summit was made on August 20, 1963, by John Bousman and his brother, William, via the southwest ridge. They so named the peak because, in a personified sense, it appears belligerent due to the difficulty encountered while climbing it. The mountain's toponym was officially adopted in 1964 by the United States Board on Geographic Names.

== Climate ==
Based on the Köppen climate classification, Bellicose Peak is located in a tundra climate zone with long, cold, snowy winters, and cool summers. Weather systems coming off the Gulf of Alaska are forced upwards by the Chugach Mountains (orographic lift), causing heavy precipitation in the form of rainfall and snowfall. Winter temperatures can drop below −10 °F with wind chill factors below −20 °F. This climate supports the Eklutna Glacier immediately east of the peak and smaller unnamed glaciers on the north slope.

== See also ==
- List of mountain peaks of Alaska
- Geography of Alaska
