= Twin Peaks (Alaska) =

Mountain in Alaska, United States

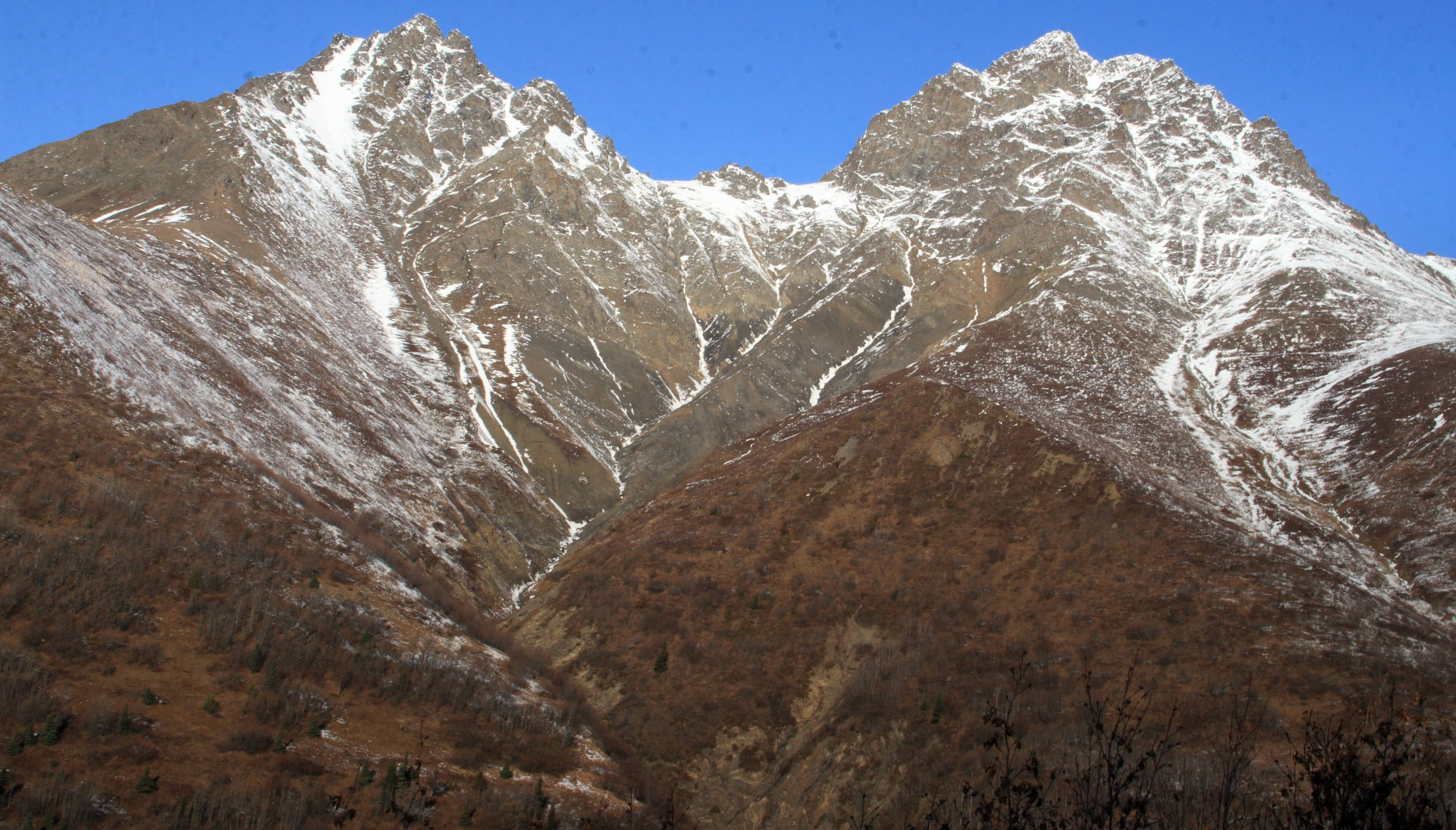
- Twin Peaks seen from near Eklutna Lake

Highest point
- Elevation: 5,840+ ft (1,780+ m)
- Prominence: 1,378 ft (420 m)
- Parent peak: Bashful Peak (8,005 ft)
- Coordinates: 61°26′41″N 149°08′40″W

Geography
- Location within Alaska
- Interactive map of Twin Peaks
- Location: Chugach State Park; Matanuska-Susitna Borough; Alaska, United States
- Parent range: Chugach Mountains
- Topo map: USGS Anchorage B-6

Climbing
- Easiest route: Scrambling class 3-4

Twin Peaks are a 5,840+ ft (1,780+ m) double summit mountain located in the Chugach Mountains, in Matanuska-Susitna Borough in the U.S. state of Alaska. The mountain is situated in Chugach State Park, 27 mi (43 km) northeast of downtown Anchorage, 11 mi (18 km) south of Palmer, and 2.5 mi (4 km) north of Eklutna Lake. East Twin Peak is the higher of the two, West Twin Peak is 5,472-foot (1,668 m), and Goat Rock is a 5249+ ft crag immediately west of both. The nearest higher peak is Pioneer Peak, 4.26 mi (7 km) to the northeast. Twin Peaks' descriptive name was reported by the United States Geological Survey in 1960, but the mountain was originally known as Lach Q'a in the Denaʼina language. Climbing the mountain involves scrambling with dangerous loose rock. The trailhead for the Twin Peaks Trail is located at the end of Eklutna Lake Road near the boat launch; however, the trail ends far short of the summit.

== Climate ==
Based on the Köppen climate classification, Twin Peaks are located in a subarctic climate zone with long, cold, snowy winters, and mild summers. Temperatures can drop below −20 °C with wind chill factors below −30 °C. Precipitation runoff from the peak drains into tributaries of the Knik River.

== Gallery ==
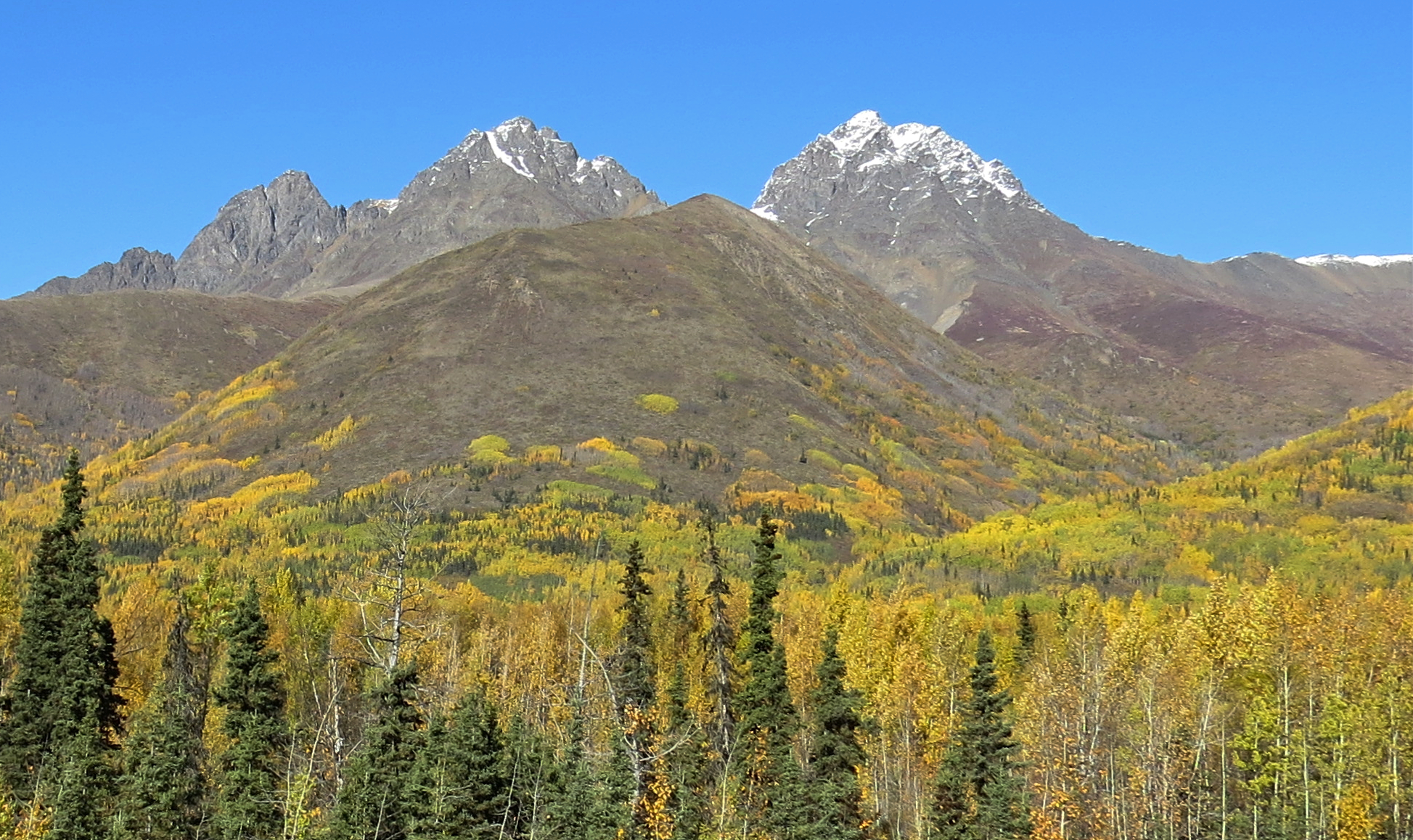
Left to right: Goat Rock, West Twin, East Twin

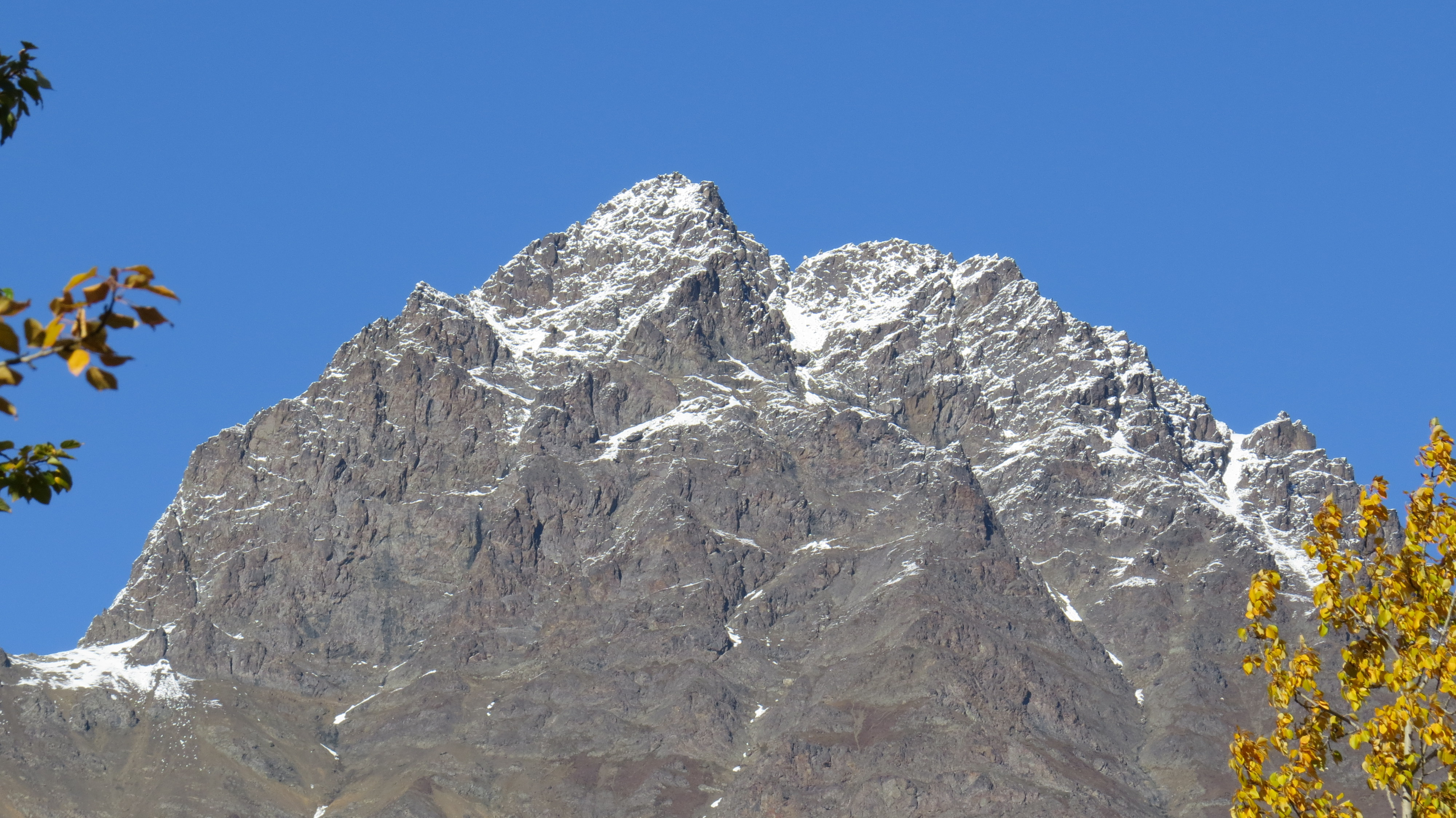
East Twin Peak

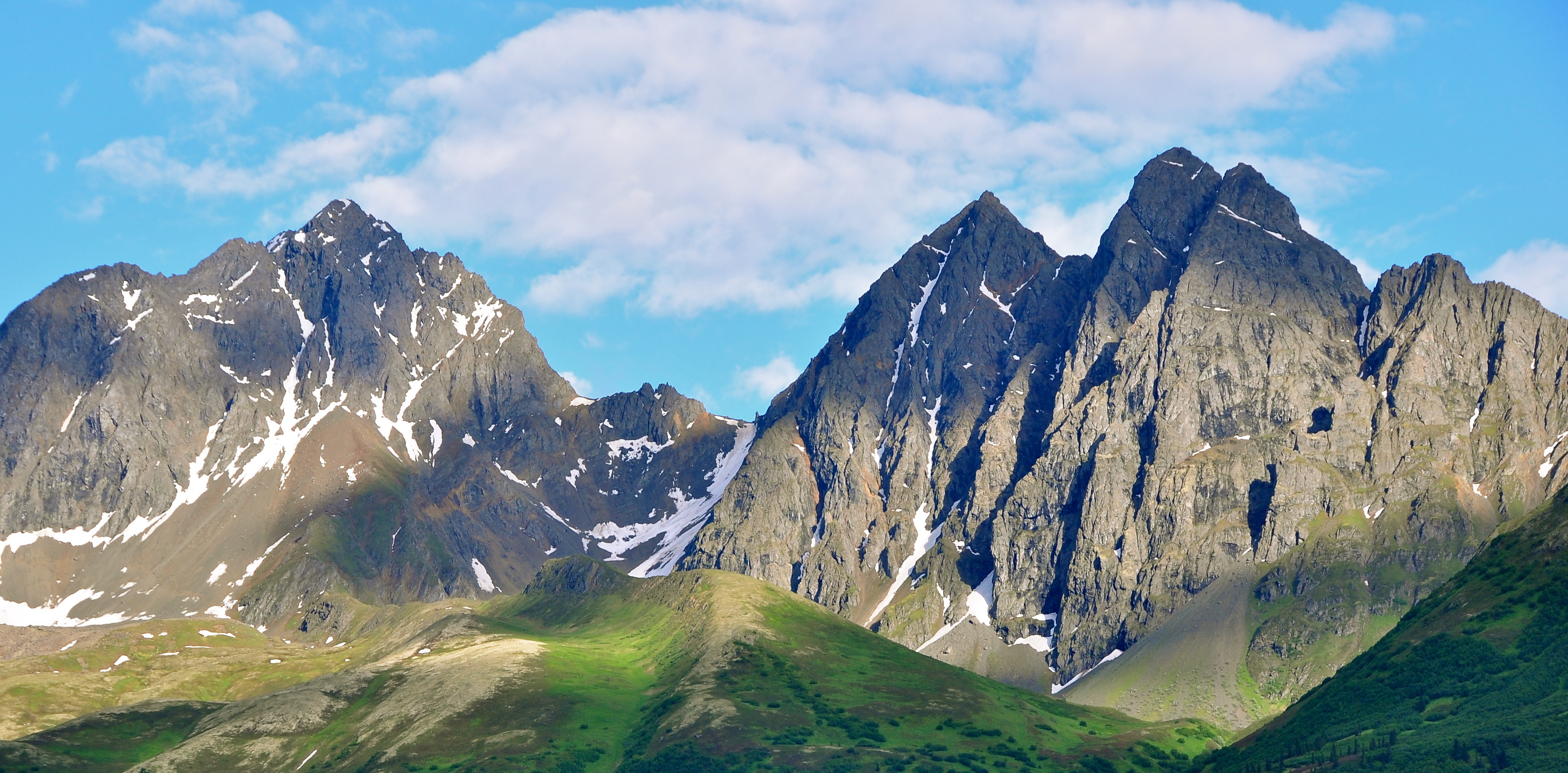
From the northwest at Reflections Lake

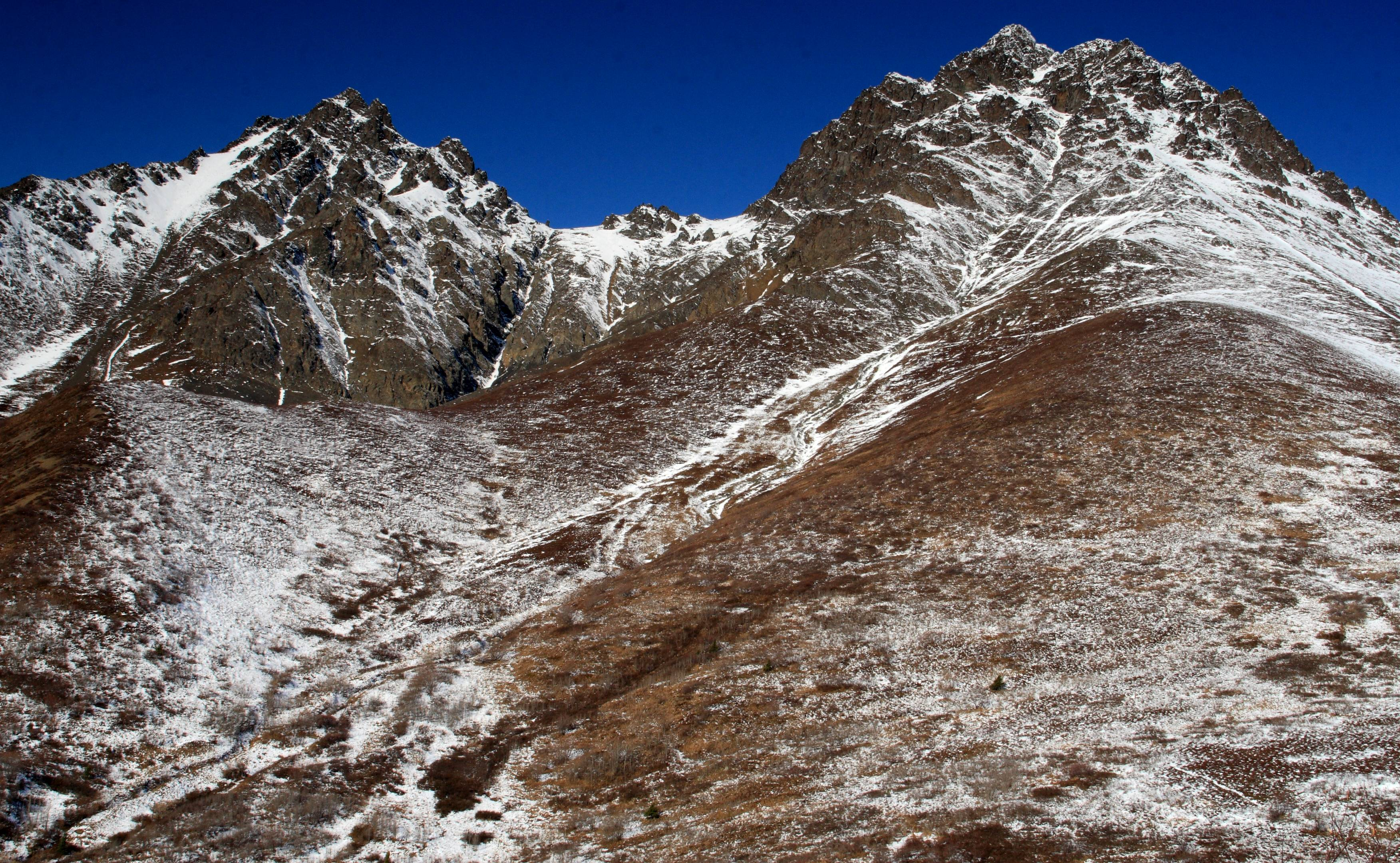
Twin Peaks from end of the trail

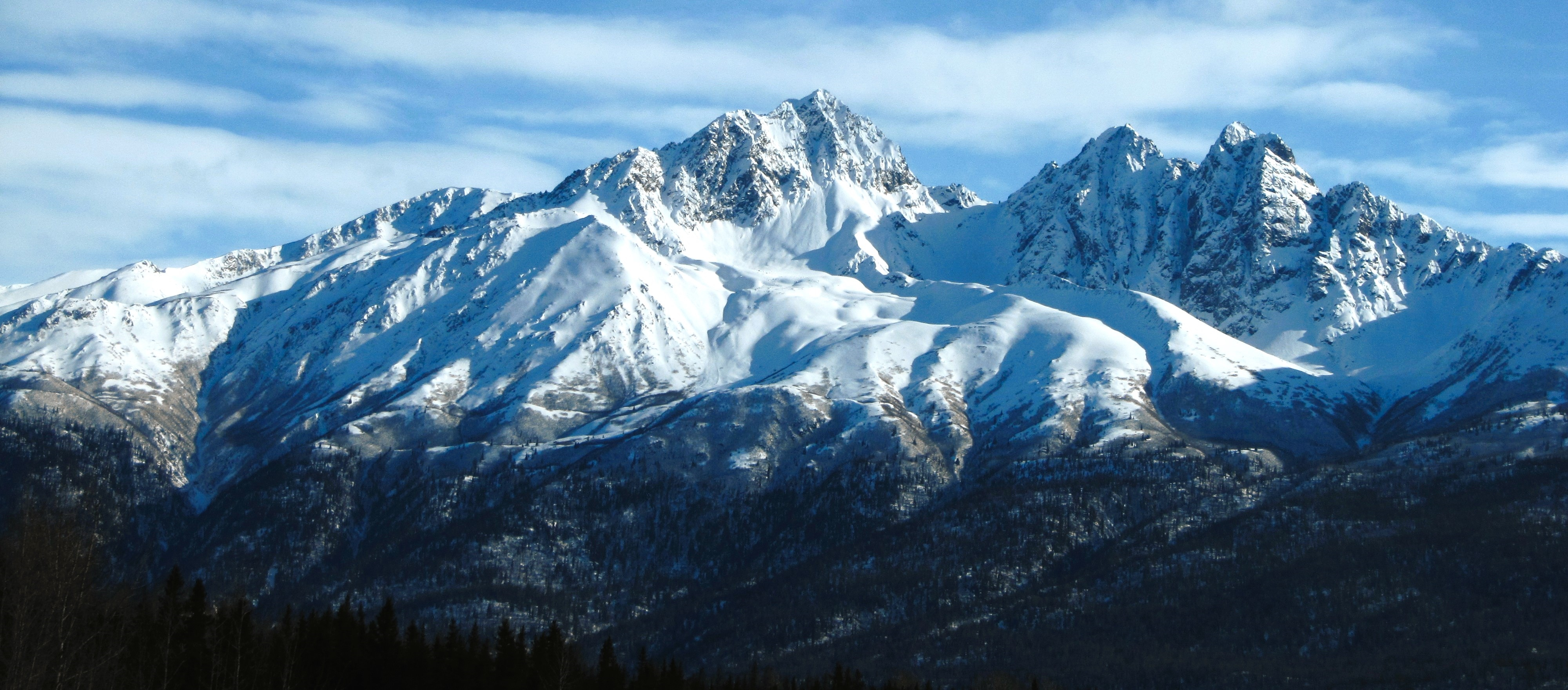
Northwest aspect

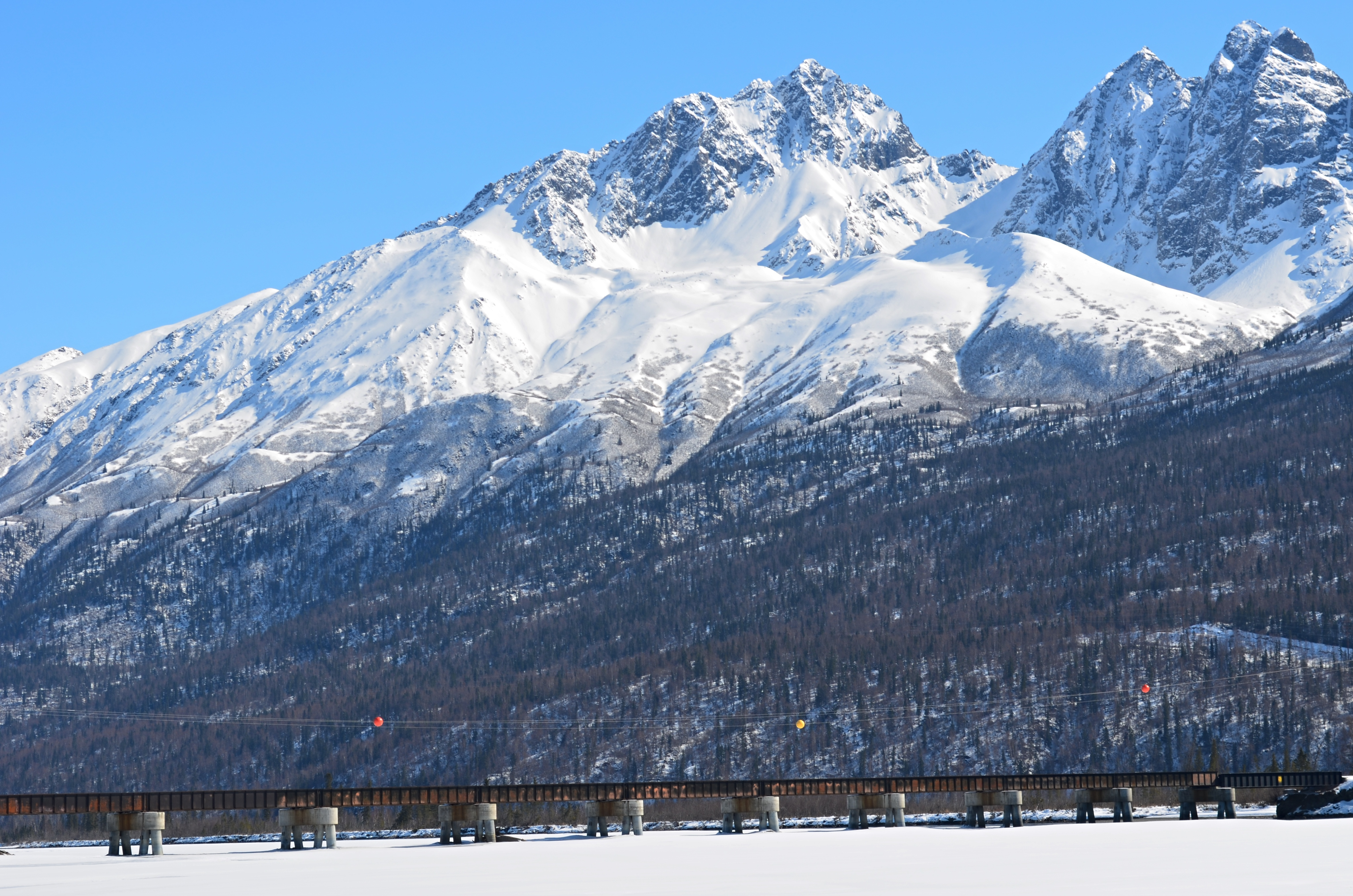
From bridge over Knik River

== See also ==
- List of mountain peaks of Alaska
- Geology of Alaska
