= Bold Peak =

Mountain in Alaska, United States

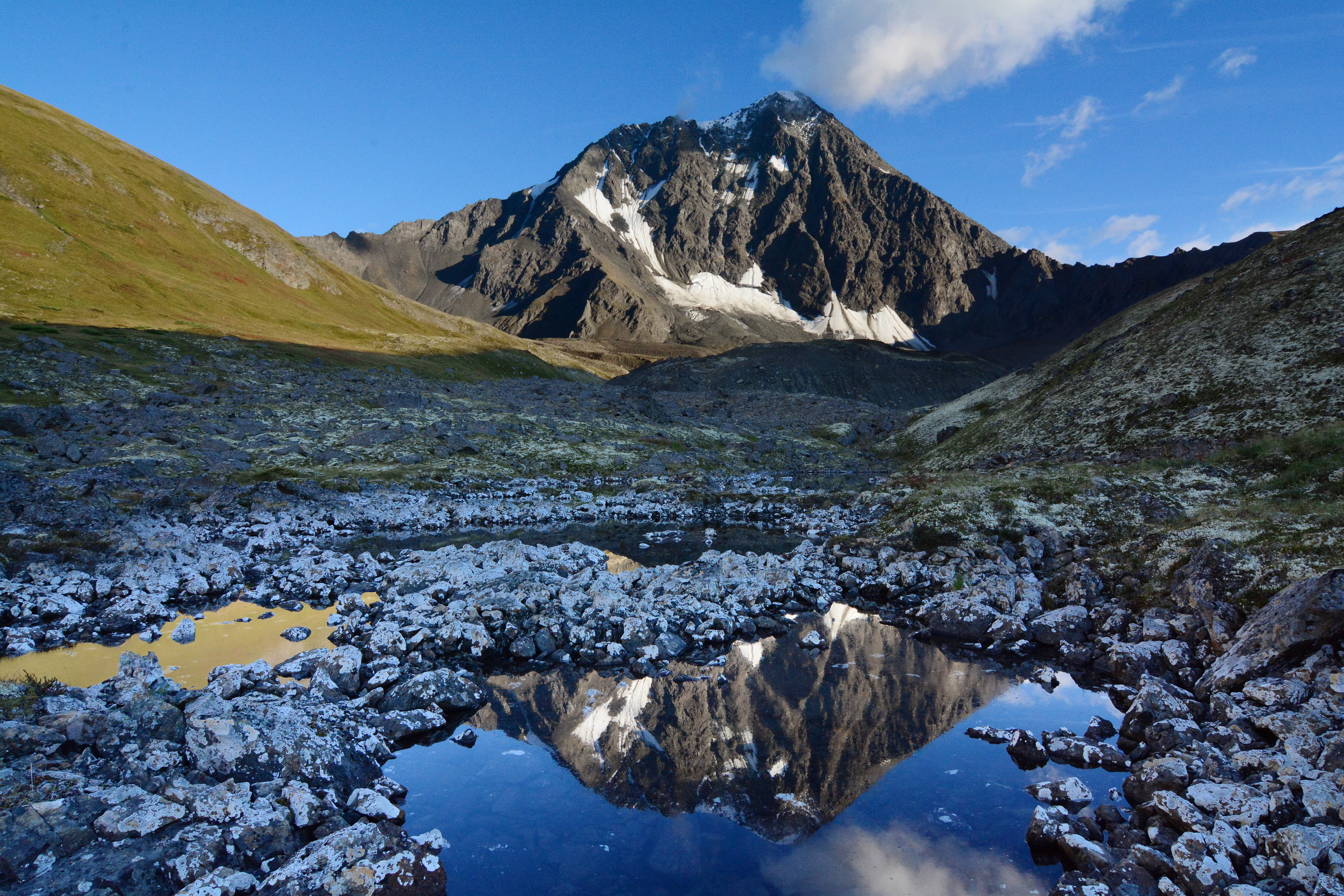
- Bold Peak, as viewed from near the top of the Bold Ridge Trail

Highest point
- Elevation: 7,522 ft (2,293 m)
- Coordinates: 61°20′37″N 148°55′29″W

Geography
- Location within Alaska
- Interactive map of Bold Peak
- Location: Anchorage Municipality, Alaska, U.S.
- Parent range: Chugach Mountains

Climbing
- Easiest route: The deep gully on the Southern face, known as Stiver's Gully

Bold Peak is a 7,522 feet (2,293 m) mountain in the U.S. state of Alaska, located in Chugach State Park in Anchorage Municipality.

== Location ==
Bold Peak sits on the eastern side of the head of Eklutna Lake, about two and a half miles northwest of Bashful Peak, the highest point in the western Chugach Mountains.

== Outdoor Recreation and Climbing Routes ==
Bold Peak is a popular destination for strong, experienced hikers. Conditions on Bold Peak can be challenging and can include high wind, high exposure, cold temperatures, and year-round snow. The standard route up Stiver's Gully involves a 10.5 mile bike ride in along the dirt road that leads to the head of Eklutna Lake, followed by approximately 6,500 vertical feet of scrambling, climbing, and hiking up loose rock to the summit. There is no trail, maintained or otherwise, to the top of the peak.

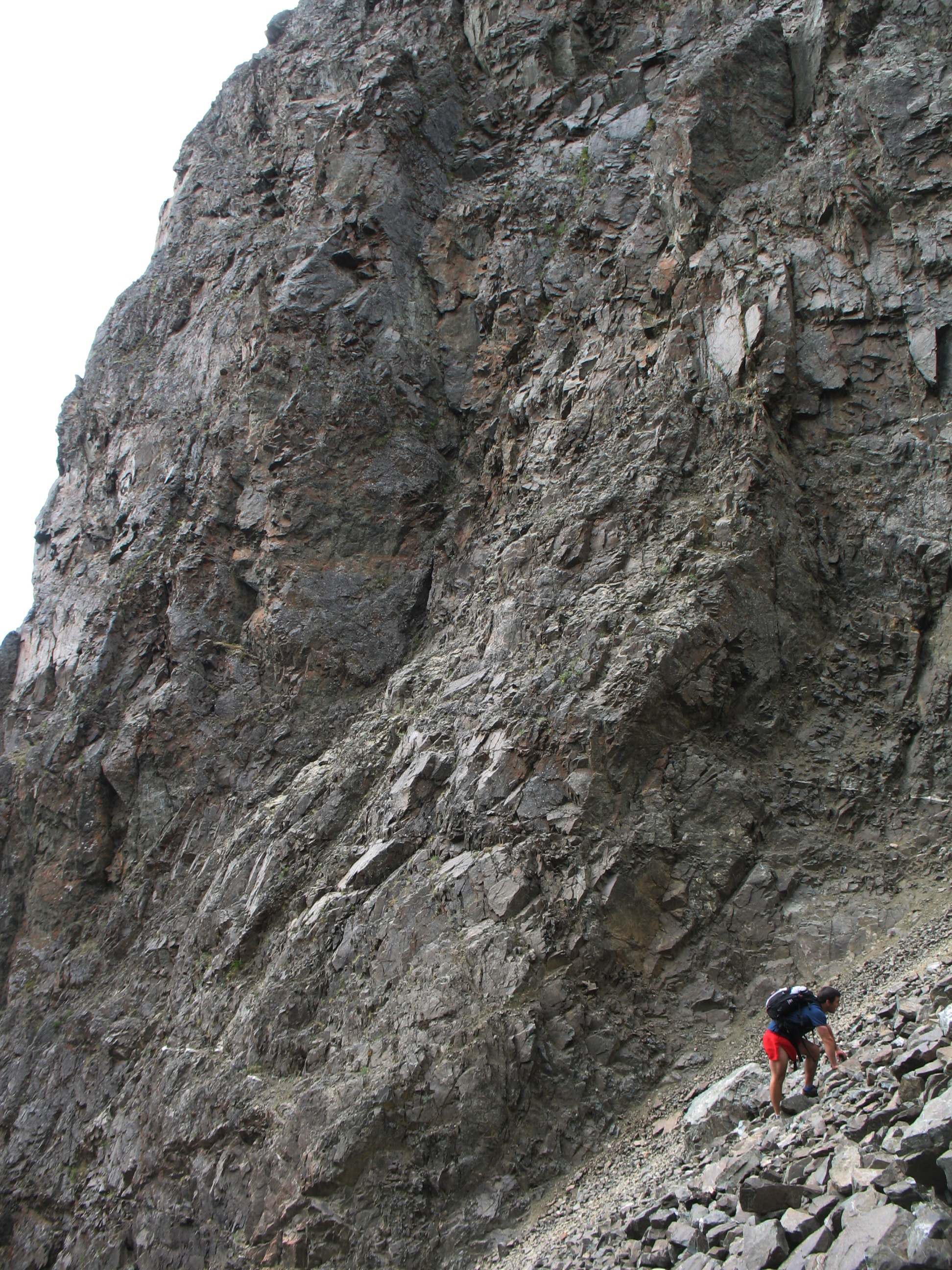
A hiker ascends the Stiver's Gully route on Bold Peak.

The Bold Ridge trail starts from the road running along Eklutna Lake, and climbs 3.5 miles up an old roadway to a tundra valley below Bold Peak's western face. The trail offers sweeping views of Eklutna Lake and access to open tundra hiking in the smaller mountains and valleys below Bold Peak. Bold Peak is rarely climbed from the Overlook Trail because the peak's western face is steep and prone to rockfall, though it may be climbed from the Overlook trail via its northern ridge.

During winter and into spring, Bold Peak's long, steep slopes and heavy snow loads make it prone to extreme avalanches, which can cross and bury the dirt road that runs along Eklutna Lake's northeastern side. In February 2000, an avalanche on Bold Peak's southwestern face "snapped thousands of two-foot-thick aspens and cottonwoods and created a mile-long field of debris". The slide "ripped out vegetation, windmilling whole trees so that they shattered and snapped into rails. At the base of the mountain, a tsunami of wind and snow and wood crossed the road, tearing into a forest that had stood for many decades. The slide then fanned out onto the flats, mowing down about 120 acres of mature spruce-birch forest and reaching about a half-mile into the valley. The force dissipated; a cloud of powder must have risen like a thunderhead."
