= Thunderbird Falls =

Waterfall in Alaska

Coordinates: 61.4422°N 149.3587°W

Thunderbird falls is a waterfall located in Eklutna, Alaska. It has an elevation of about 100 feet and flows into the Eklutna River. Due to its proximity to Anchorage, about a thirty-minute drive, it is a popular place for tourists and those living nearby. The waterfall is comingled with a 1.6-mile round trip hike to attract people, especially those with young children and tourists, to the falls and the Chugach State Park, where it resides. The path has two main routes with the final destination being the only difference. The easier first route ends at a viewing deck near the top of the falls, whereas the second one is harder to traverse, but will end closer to the bottom of the falls.

== Climate ==
Since Thunderbird Falls is in Alaska, it has a subarctic climate, long freezing winters and short mild summers. On average, the falls sees about 79 inches of snow every year; this paired with the average low of 8.6 °F in January creates a cold snowy environment for the falls and its accompanying trail. With a climate this cold, the water will freeze and turn almost completely into seemingly blue ice. However, during the summer, the average July high temperature is 67 °F and the falls flows strongly, creating a mist around it.

== Animals ==
The Eklutna River, the river the falls flows into, hosts a plethora of salmon. Thunderbird falls purifies the water and infuses it with oxygen, helping the salmon and other aquatic organisms that live in the run offs of the falls survive and thrive. Salmon also attract predators, such as bears. Black, brown, and grizzly bears all inhabit this area and can be commonly found throughout the hike and the neighboring state park. This can be potentially dangerous for those not accustom to proper techniques for preventing bear attacks, such as tourists, but most Alaskans and Alaskan schools already know or teach these techniques. The river is also home to otters and species of fish other than salmon. Moose are another animal common in this animal along with a large variety of birds, most famously eagles and ravens. These birds create homes in the large trees because they provide advantageous nesting areas near their primary source of food, fish.

== Vegetation ==
The environment around the falls and the accompanying state park hosts upwards of 500 species of plants. Most of these plants include trees, like the Sitka spruce, shrubs, like the blueberry bush, and other herbaceous vegetation, like the devil's club. Rivers with a waterfall produce a healthier environment for plants and trees, which leads to less soil erosion and an overall healthier ecosystem. The falls help keep the Eklutna River healthy, which helps lessen soil erosion and improve the environment around the river.

== See also ==
- List of waterfalls
