= Eklutna Dam =

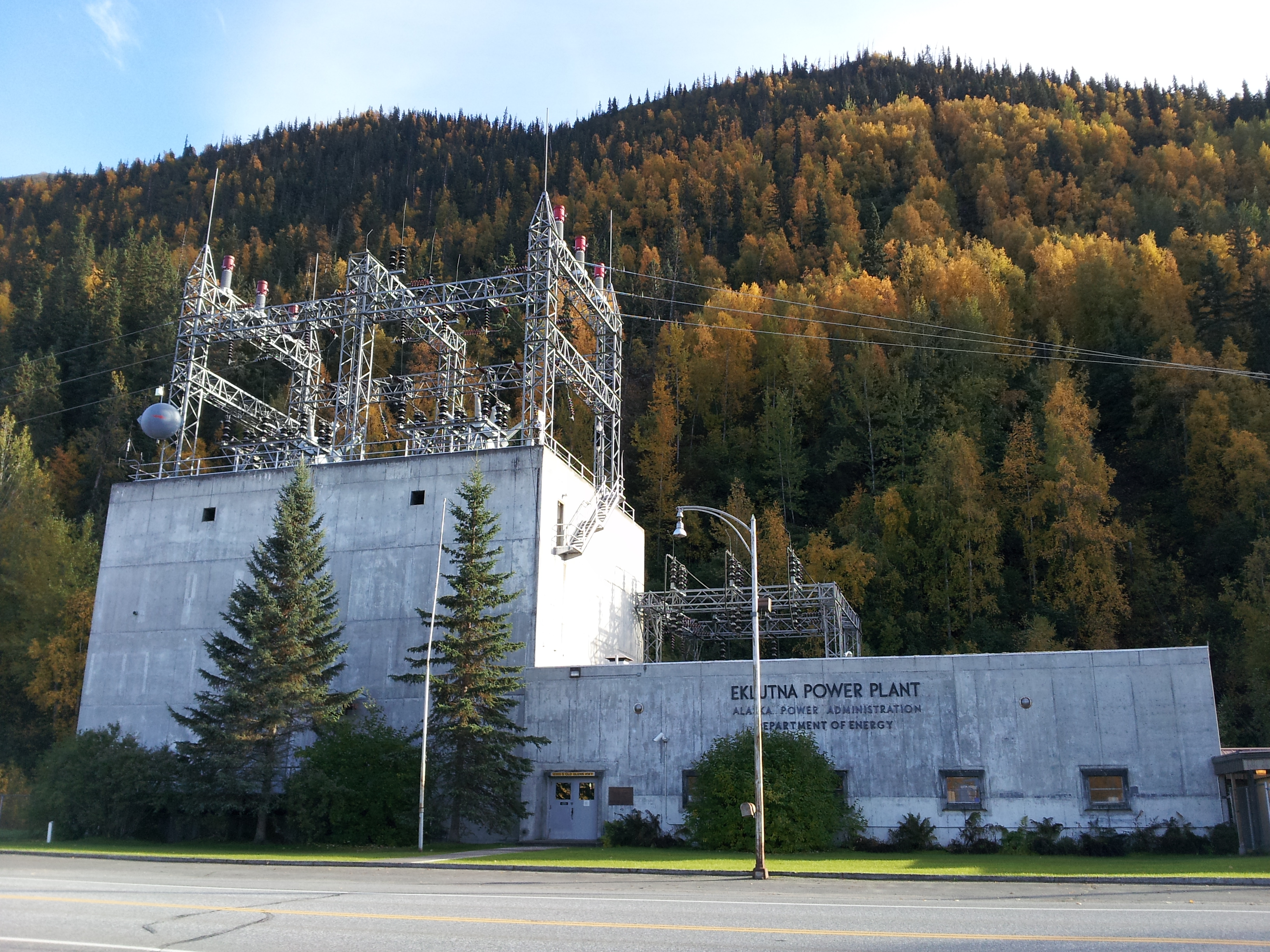
- The Eklutna Power Plant

- Location within Alaska
- Country: United States
- Location: Anchorage, Alaska
- Coordinates: 61°24′14.78″N 149°9′0.24″W
- Purpose: Power
- Status: Operational
- Construction began: Initial: 1927; Raising: 1952
- Opening date: Initial: 1929; Raising: 1955
- Owners: Chugach Electric, Matanuska Electric

Dam and spillways
- Type of dam: Embankment
- Impounds: Eklutna River
- Height (foundation): 26 ft (7.9 m)
- Length: 555 ft (169 m)
- Elevation at crest: 875 ft (267 m)
- Dam volume: 5,000 cu yd (3,800 m^{3})

Reservoir
- Creates: Eklutna Lake
- Total capacity: 182,000 acre⋅ft (224,000,000 m^{3})
- Surface area: 3,247 acres (1,314 ha)
- Maximum length: 7 mi (11 km)
- Normal elevation: 867.5 ft (264.4 m)

Eklutna Power Plant
- Coordinates: 61°28′30.96″N 149°8′59.73″W
- Commission date: 1955
- Type: Conventional, diversion
- Turbines: 2 x 23.5 MW Francis-type
- Installed capacity: 47 MW

The Eklutna Dam, also referred to as the New Eklutna Dam or Upper Eklutna Dam, is an embankment dam on the Eklutna River about 30 mi (48 km) northeast of Anchorage in Alaska, United States. The primary purpose of the dam is hydroelectric power generation and it supports a 47 MW power plant. It was first completed in 1929 but was rehabilitated or rebuilt on several occasions over its history. Ownership of the dam and power plant is shared by Chugach Electric and Matanuska Electric.

== Background ==
The original dams and power plant was the idea of businessman Frank Reed. It was constructed by the Anchorage Light and Power Company between 1927 and 1929 atop a natural landslide dam in the Eklutna Valley. It regulated the river to the Lower Eklutna Dam which diverted water into the Old Eklutna Power Plant. The lake dam was rebuilt and improved in 1941 after the previous structure failed. During this same year, the population in Anchorage increased greatly with the onset of World War II. To cope with increasing power demand, the United States Bureau of Reclamation proposed the Eklutna Project. It included raising the dam and installing a new power plant opposite Goat Mountain to the north, along the Knik River. The United States Congress authorized the project on 31 July 1950. Construction began in 1951 and raising the dam commenced the following year. The first generator was commissioned on 8 January 1955, the second and last on 1 April 1955. On 1 July 1955 the entire project was complete. The Great Alaska earthquake in March 1964 caused significant damage to the dam, particularly the water intake for the power plant. The intake shifted towards the lake and frozen alluvium beneath and near the dam's spillway densified, creating voids. Later, in July of the same year, as the ground thawed, two cracks formed near the spillway and portions of the dam filled the void. The dam was deemed unsafe and a taller embankment dam was constructed just downstream. Construction and rehabilitation was carried out until 1966. In 1997 the Alaska Power Authority sold the dam and power plant to Anchorage Municipal Light and Power, Chugach Electric Association and Matanuska Electric Association for US$6 million. Chugach Electric acquired Anchorage Municipal Light and Power in 2020.

== Design ==
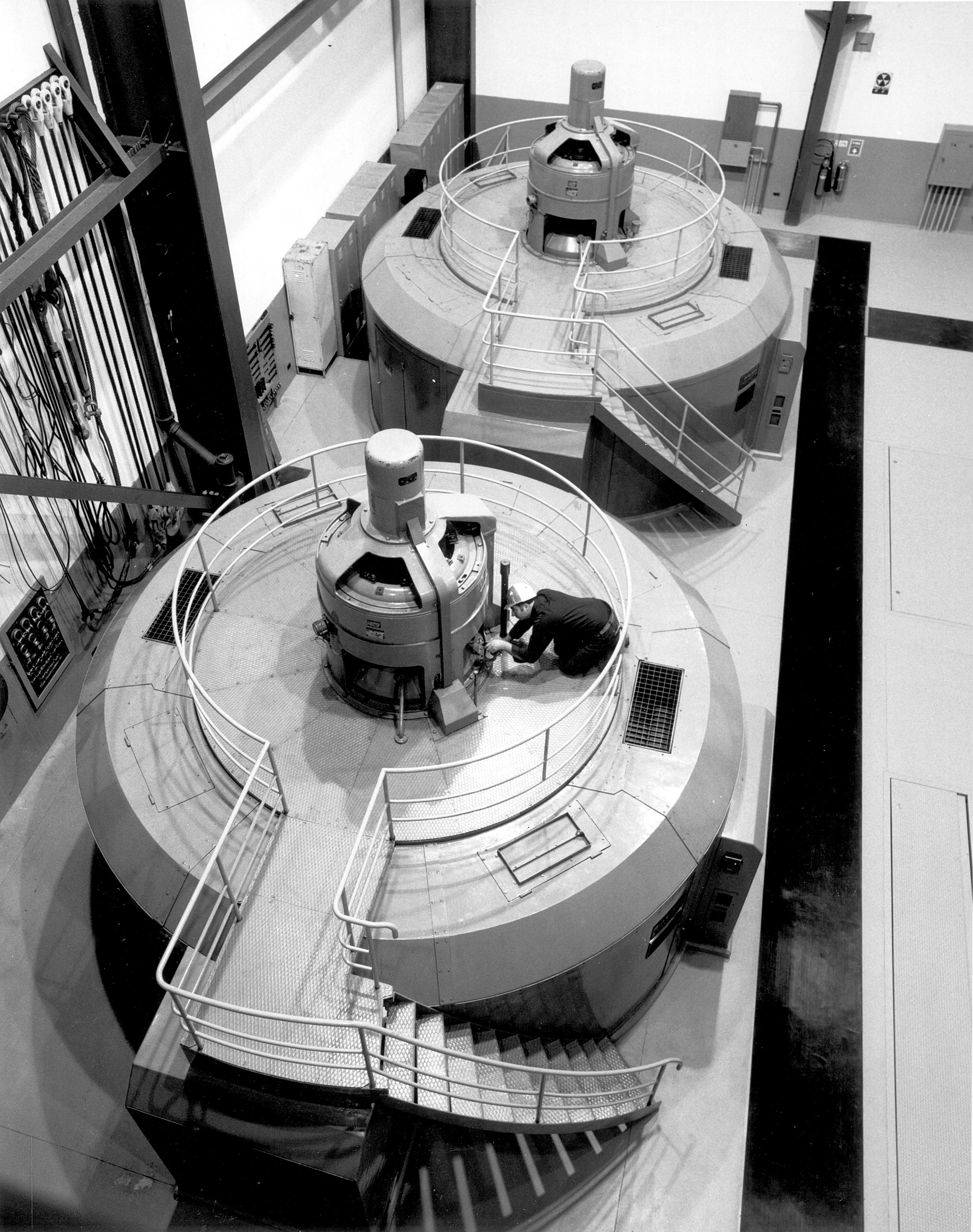
Inside the power plant

The dam is 26 ft (7.9 m) tall and 555 ft (169 m) long. It is filled with 5,000 cu yd (3,800 m^{3}) sand, gravel and earth and its crest is 875 ft (267 m) above sea level. The reservoir created by the dam, Eklutna Lake, covers 3,247 acres (1,314 ha) and is 7 mi (11 km) long. At an elevation of 867.5 ft (264.4 m), the reservoir holds 182,000 acre⋅ft (224,000,000 m^{3}) of water. To connect the reservoir and power plant, there is a 9 ft (2.7 m) diameter, 4.46 mi (7.18 km) long penstock which starts at the intake, located on the northwest corner of the lake. From the intake, water rushes down the penstock where it reaches two 23.5 MW Francis turbine-generators. Water used by the power plant is then discharged into the Knik River.
