= Bashful Peak =

Mountain in Alaska, United States

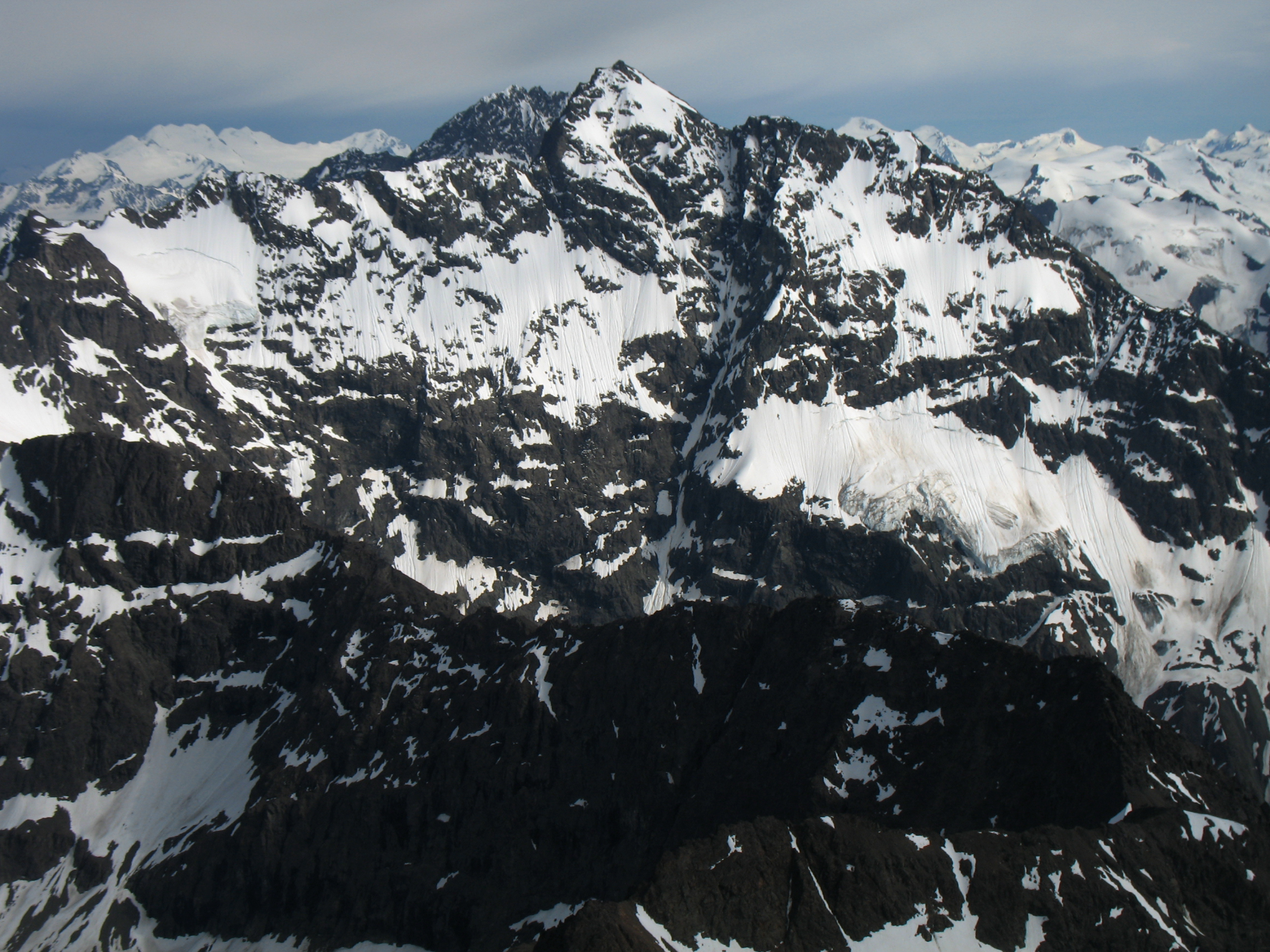
- The western face of Bashful Peak, as seen from the summit of Bold Peak

Highest point
- Elevation: 8,005 ft (2,440 m)
- Prominence: 5,275 ft (1,608 m)
- Listing: US most prominent peaks 107th; Ultra
- Coordinates: 61°18′27″N 148°52′11″W

Geography
- Location within Alaska
- Location: Chugach State Park, Alaska, U.S.
- Parent range: Chugach Mountains
- Topo map: USGS Anchorage B-5

Climbing
- First ascent: 1959
- Easiest route: The southern ridge

Bashful Peak is a mountain in the U.S. state of Alaska, located in Chugach State Park. At 8,005 ft (2,440 m), Bashful is the highest peak in Chugach State Park, and the highest peak in the Municipality of Anchorage. The peak carries snow year-round and several small glaciers hang from its steep western face.

The peak was named in 1958 by members of the Mountaineering Club of Alaska because "it is often hidden by other peaks, ridges, or clouds."

== Climbing ==
Bashful Peak is a challenging climb due to its height, loose rock, remoteness, exposure, and the chaotic weather of the Chugach Mountains, which includes year-round snowstorms. Bashful Peak sees very few visitors, and there are no trails up the mountain itself. Climbers typically start at the Eklutna Lake trailhead, hike up the East fork of the Eklutna River, climb the beginning of Stivers Gully on Bold Peak, climb out of the gully and cross a small valley, and ascend Bashful Peak via its southern ridge.

== See also ==
- List of mountain peaks of North America
  - List of mountain peaks of the United States
    - List of mountain peaks of Alaska
- List of Ultras of the United States
