= Flattop Mountain (Anchorage, Alaska) =

Mountain in Alaska, United States

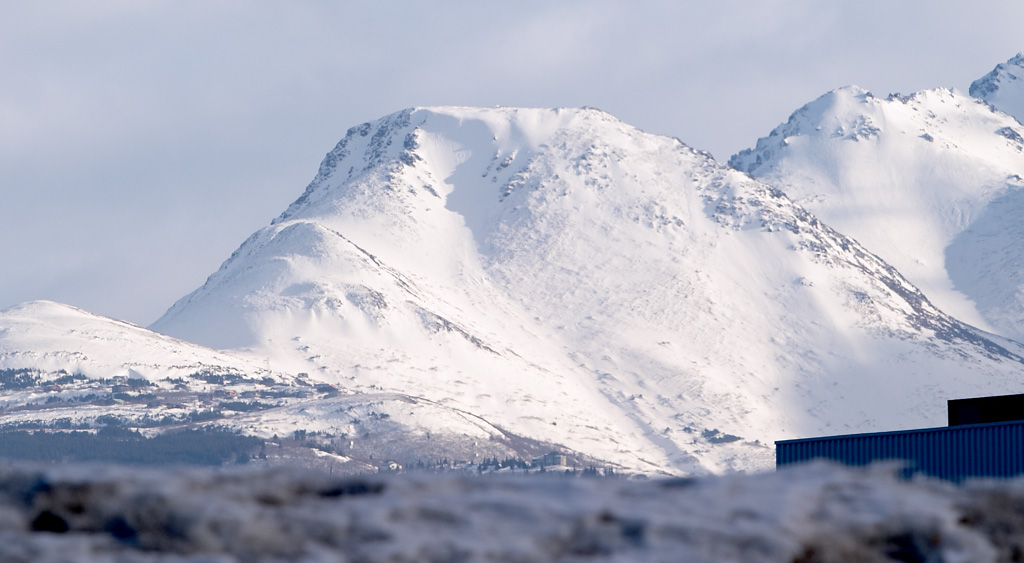
- Flattop as seen from south Anchorage

Highest point
- Elevation: 3,510 ft (1,070 m)
- Coordinates: 61°05′26″N 149°39′55″W

Geography
- Location within Alaska
- Interactive map of Flattop Mountain
- Location: Anchorage Municipality, Alaska, U.S.
- Parent range: Chugach Mountains
- Topo map: USGS Anchorage A-8

Flattop Mountain is a 3,510 feet (1,070 m) mountain in the U.S. state of Alaska, located in Chugach State Park just east of urban Anchorage. It is the most climbed mountain in the state.

It is usually reached by driving to the Glen Alps trailhead and following a 1.5-mile (2.4-km) trail, with an elevation gain of 1,280 feet (390 m) from the parking lot to the plateau. Off the plateau loop is a difficult trail to the peak. Since it is the most accessible mountain to Anchorage, Flattop is a very popular location for hiking, climbing, berry picking, paragliding, and backcountry skiing. Campouts are held on the summit at the summer and winter solstices.

Flattop is known for its panoramic views of Anchorage and the surrounding area; Denali, Mount Foraker, and Mount Spurr are sometimes visible on very clear days.

== Gallery ==
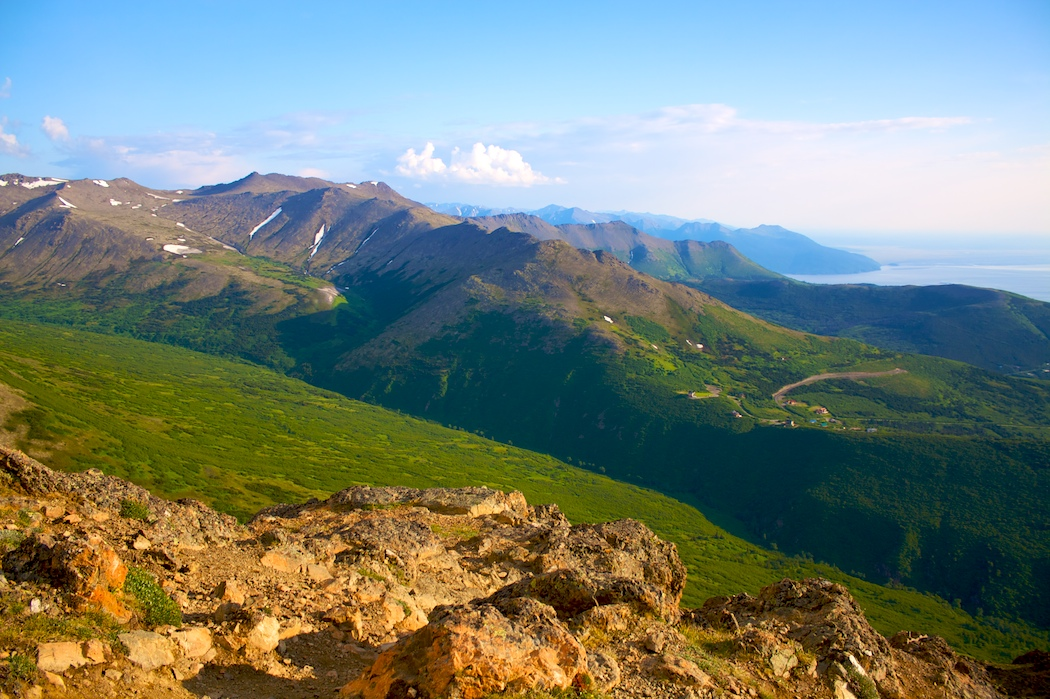
View from Flat Top Peak during Alaskan summer
