= Potter Section House =

Historic house in Alaska, United States

- U.S. National Register of Historic Places
- Alaska Heritage Resources Survey
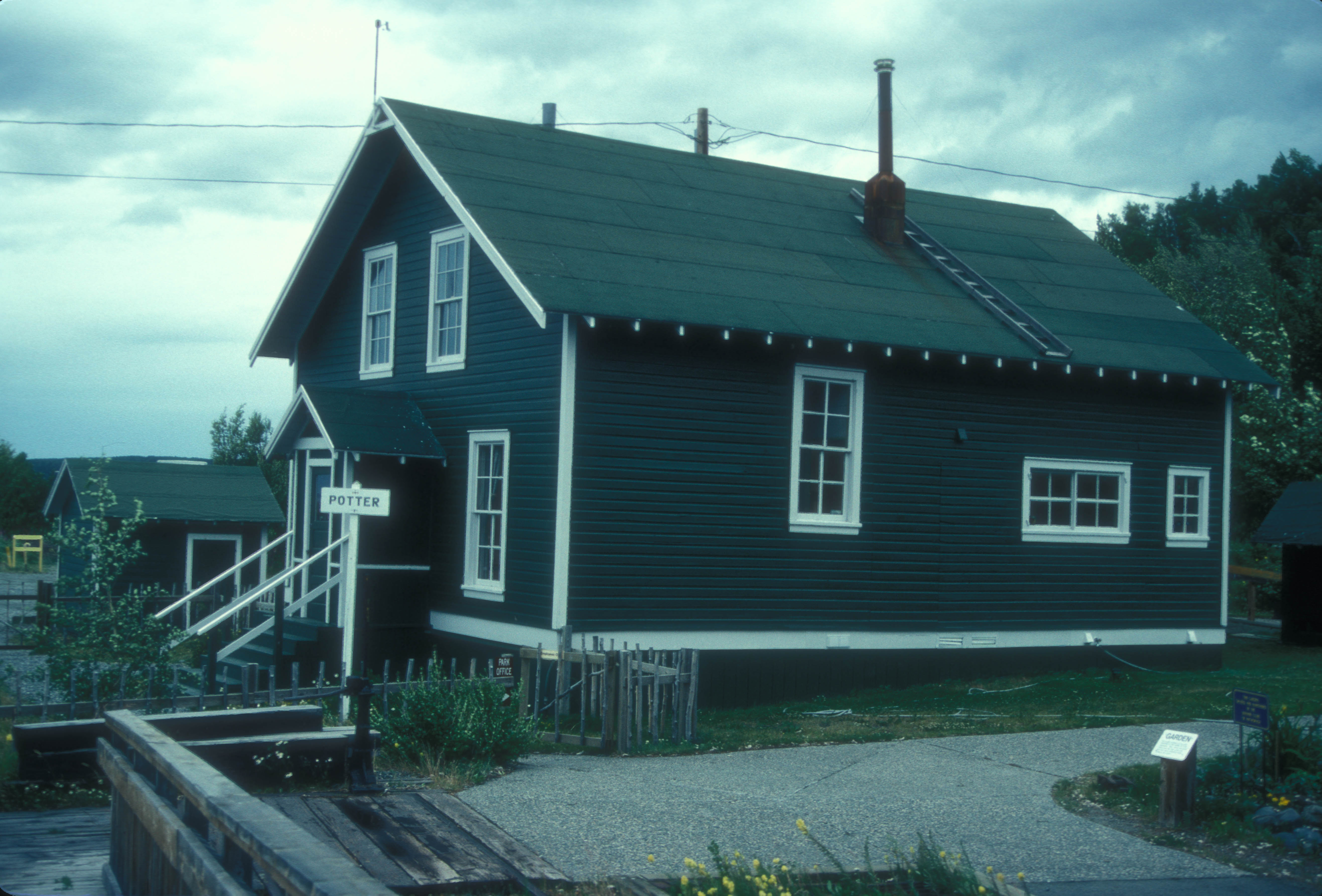

- Location within Alaska
- Location: Off AK 1, Anchorage, Alaska
- Coordinates: 61°3′7″N 149°47′49″W
- Area: less than one acre
- Built: 1929
- Built by: Alaska Railroad
- NRHP reference No.: 85003113
- AHRS No.: ANC-075
- Added to NRHP: December 6, 1985

The Potter Section House is a historic section house in Anchorage Borough, Alaska. It is located at Mile 115.3 of the Seward Highway and Mile 100.6 of the Alaska Railroad. It is a 1 1/2-story wood-frame structure with a gable roof. The main facade has a center entrance flanked by sash windows, while the rear facade also has an entrance but only a single window. Built in 1929 to a slight variation from a standard plan, it is the last of four section houses to survive on the Anchorage stretch of the railroad. The building was used as housing for workers on the surround section of railroad until section-based maintenance was discontinued in 1978. It currently hosts the Chugach State Park headquarters.

The house was listed on the National Register of Historic Places in 1985.

== See also ==
- National Register of Historic Places listings in Anchorage, Alaska
