= Chugach State Park =

State park in Alaska, United States

Coordinates: 61°03′07″N 149°47′49″W

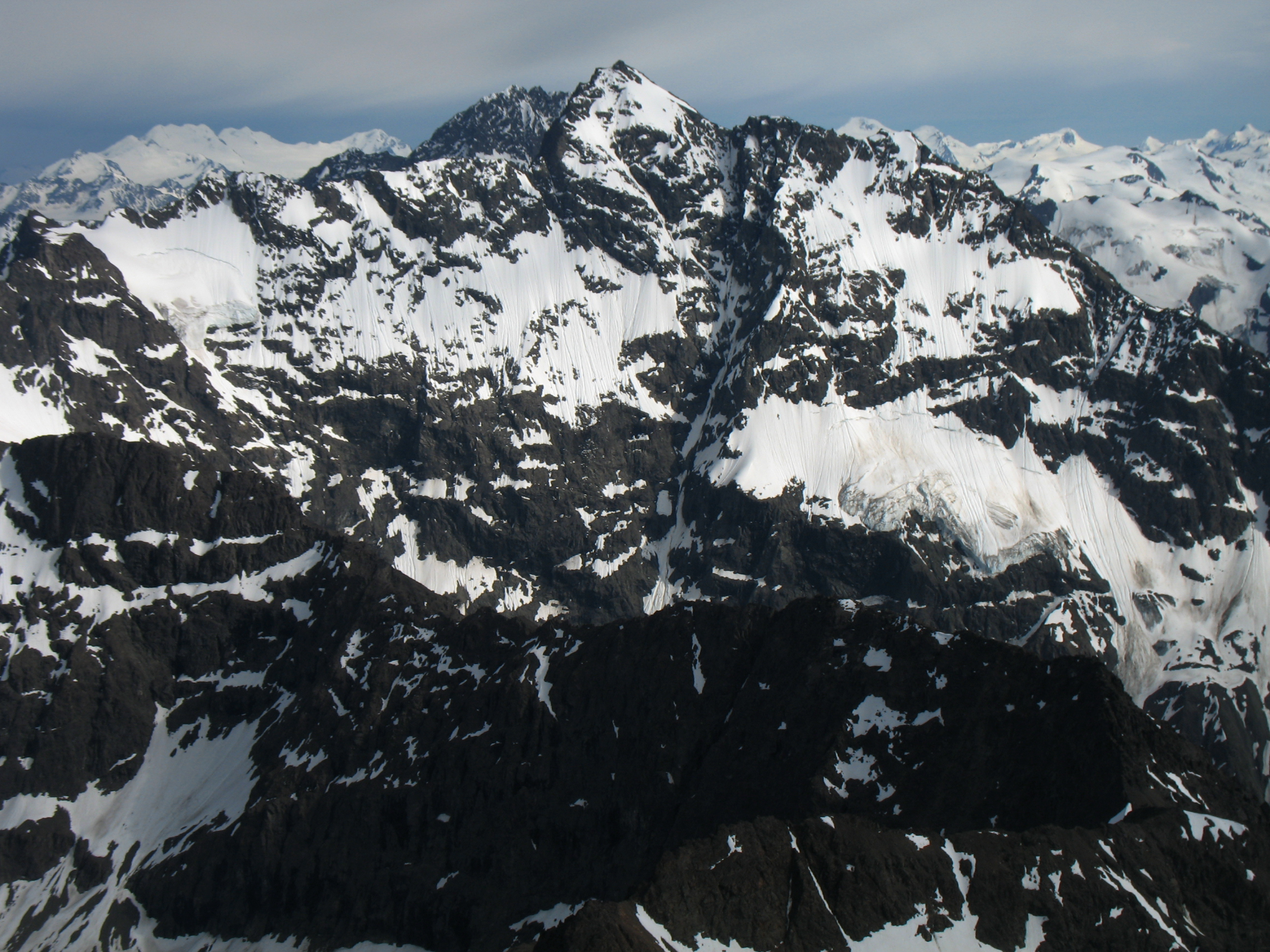
Bashful Peak, at 8,005 feet (2,440 meters), is the tallest mountain in Chugach State Park.

Chugach State Park covers 495,204 acres (2,004 square kilometers) covering a hilly region immediately east of Anchorage, in south-central Alaska.

Established by legislation signed into law on August 6, 1970, by Alaska governor Keith Miller, this state park was created to provide recreational opportunities, protect the scenic value of the Chugach Mountains and other geographic features, and ensure the safety of the water supply for Anchorage. The park, managed by Alaska State Parks, is the third-largest state park in the United States, and consists of geographically disparate areas each with different attractions and facilities. Only Anza-Borrego Desert State Park in California and Wood-Tikchik State Park in western Alaska are larger. Though primarily in the Municipality of Anchorage, a small portion of the park north of the Eklutna Lake area in the vicinity of Pioneer Peak lies within the Matanuska-Susitna Borough. The current superintendent is Justin Dipaola-Allen.

Hunting and fishing are permitted in the Chugach under regulations established by the Alaska Department of Fish and Game for game management unit 14c. Target practice is not allowed within the park boundaries.

== Eklutna Lake ==
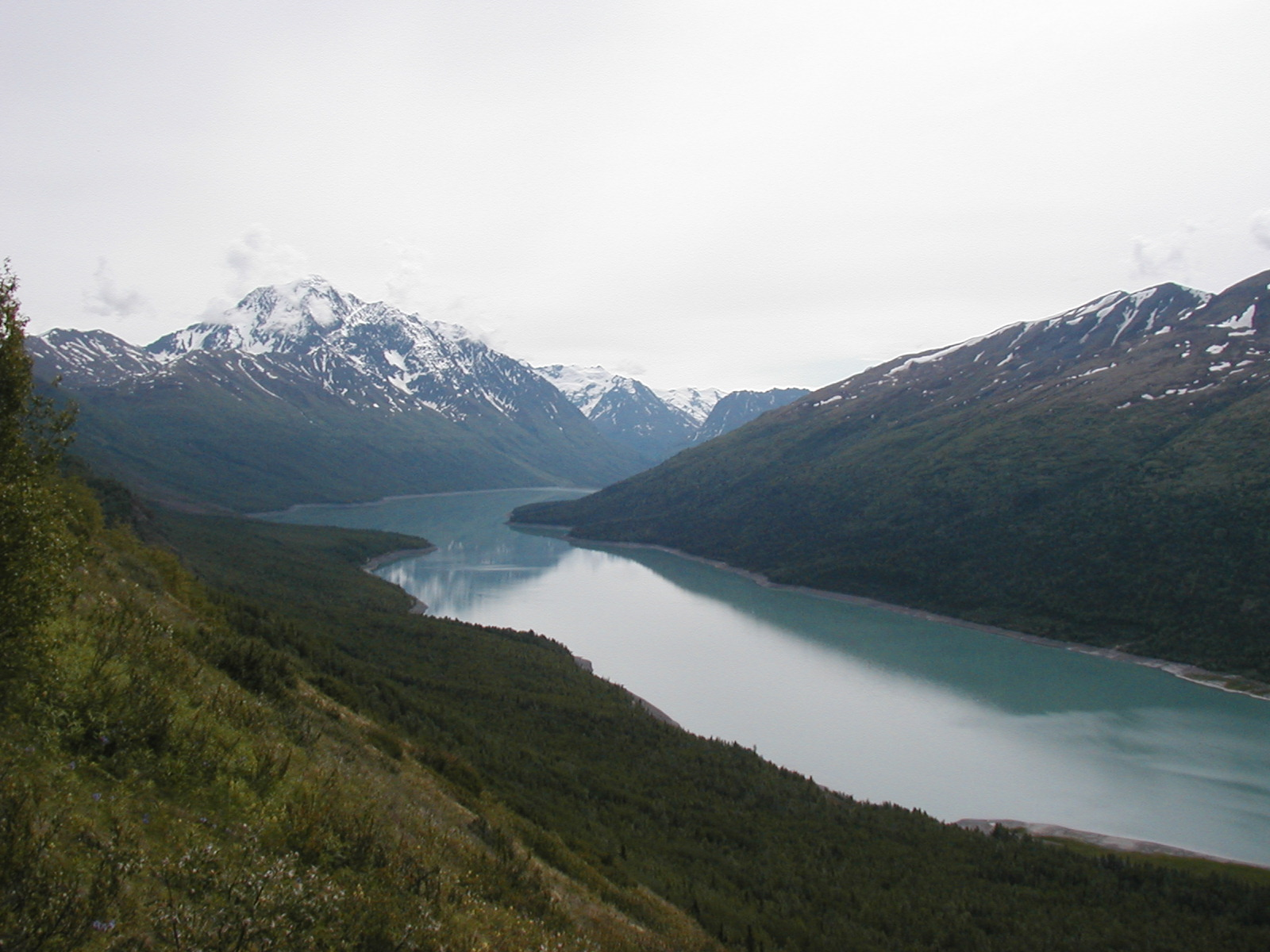
Eklutna Lake and Bold Peak in Chugach State Park seen from Twin Peaks trail

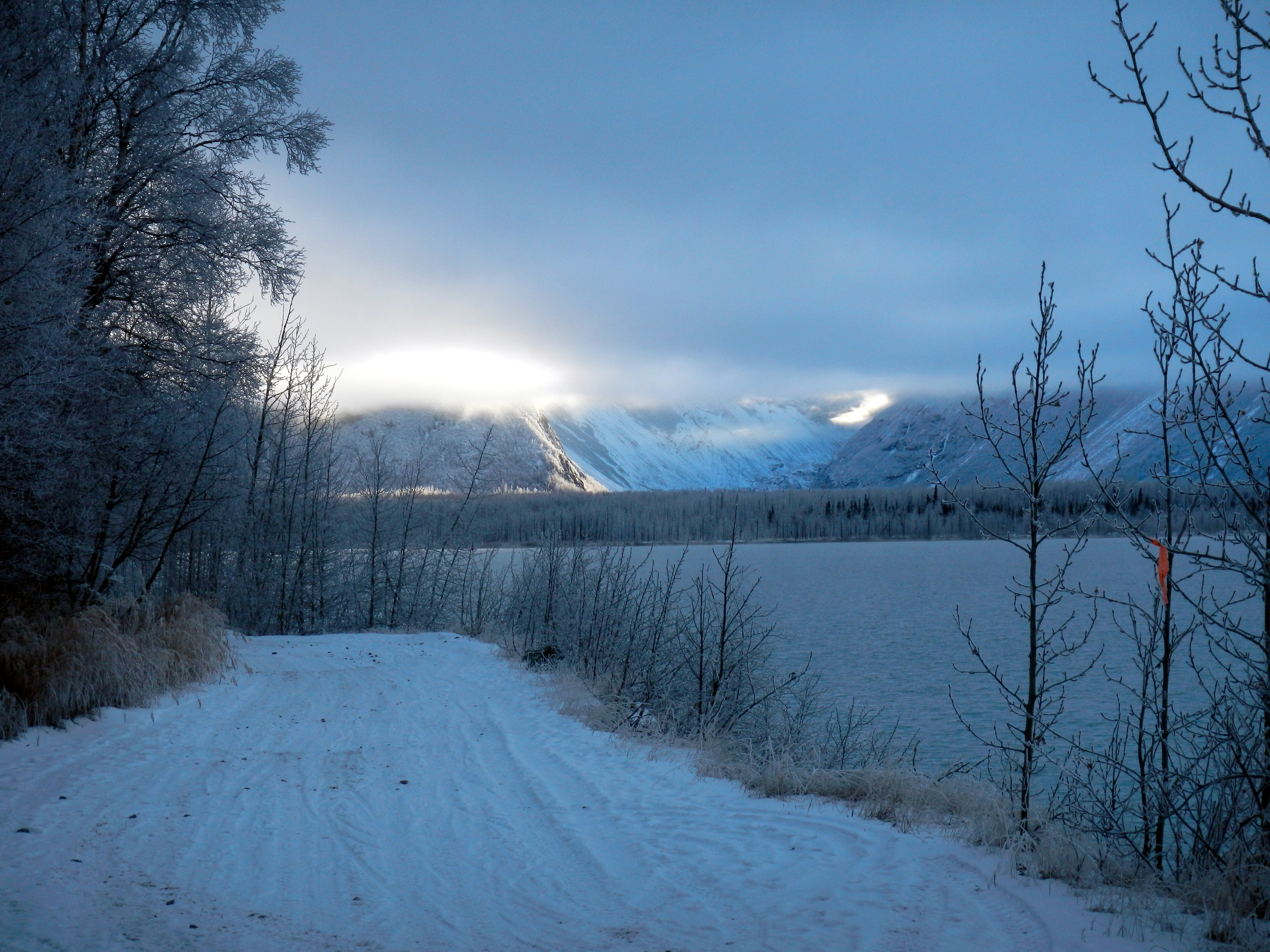
The Lakeside Trail along Eklutna Lake in winter

The Lakeside Trail travels 12.7 miles (20.4 kilometers) along the shores of Eklutna Lake until it reaches the mile-long Eklutna Glacier Trail that leads in short order to the moraines at the foot of the colossal blue ice of Eklutna Glacier. In the summer, travelers go on foot, by mountain bike, ATV or on horseback, past the lake by way of largely flat trail to the glacier. A traverse with three huts maintained by the Mountaineering Club of Alaska begins at the end of the trail and heads over the tops of the Eklutna, Whiteout, Eagle and Raven glaciers, and ends 31 miles (50 kilometers) away at Crow Pass near Girdwood on the opposite side of the park. In wintertime, trail users are able to travel the same route by snowmobile (snowmachine), snowshoes or cross-country skis as permitted by regulation and weather conditions. As most of the trail is an old roadbed, the trail is a popular winter destination for skijoring and dogsledding. There are two remote campgrounds in the area in addition to a frontcountry campground open during the summer. Two public use cabins are available for rent on the Lakeside Trail. Non-motorized boats, and boats with an electric motor, are allowed on Eklutna Lake. The tallest point in the park, Bashful Peak, towers over the lake at a height of 8,005 feet (2,440 meters). Bush planes are able to land on the far (southern) side of Eklutna Lake at the unpaved Bold Airstrip. North of Eklutna, the southern summit of Pioneer Peak can be reached from Knik River Road via the Pioneer Ridge Trail beginning outside the park boundaries in the Matanuska-Susitna Borough.

Visitors to Eklutna Lake have the opportunity to experience a variety of plant life at different elevations. Dense forests, characteristically of white spruce (Picea glauca), paper birch (Betula papyrifera) and quaking aspen (Populus tremuloides), dominate the lower elevations. Ferns, mushrooms, and wildflowers such as dwarf dogwood (Cornus canadensis), fireweed (Epilobium angustifolium), and the parasitic northern groundcone (Boschniakia rossica) of the broomrape family cover the forest floor. At higher elevations wildflowers such as mountain avens (Dryas octopetala) and the Alaska state flower, the alpine forget-me-not (Myosotis alpestris), grow in profusion. The alpine milkvetch (Astragalus alpinus), bog wintergreen (Pyrola asarifolia) and wild geranium (Geranium erianthum) predominate on lower slopes, while further up the nootka lupine (Lupinus nootkatensis), coastal paintbrush (Castilleja unalaschcensis), prickly saxifrage (Saxifraga tricuspidata), the poisonous yellow anemone (Anemone richardsonii) and eventually the mosses of the tundra will reward hikers. Berry picking is popular in late summer and early fall. Highbush cranberries (Viburnum edule), lingonberries (Vaccinium vitis-idaea), northern redcurrants (Ribes triste) and bog blueberries (Vaccinium uliginosum) grow along the lower trails. Dwarf blueberries (Vaccinium caepitosum), alpine bearberries (Arctostaphylos alpina) and crowberries (Empetrum nigrum) are found higher up. Correctly identifying berries before consuming them is important as some species are poisonous.

== Eagle River ==
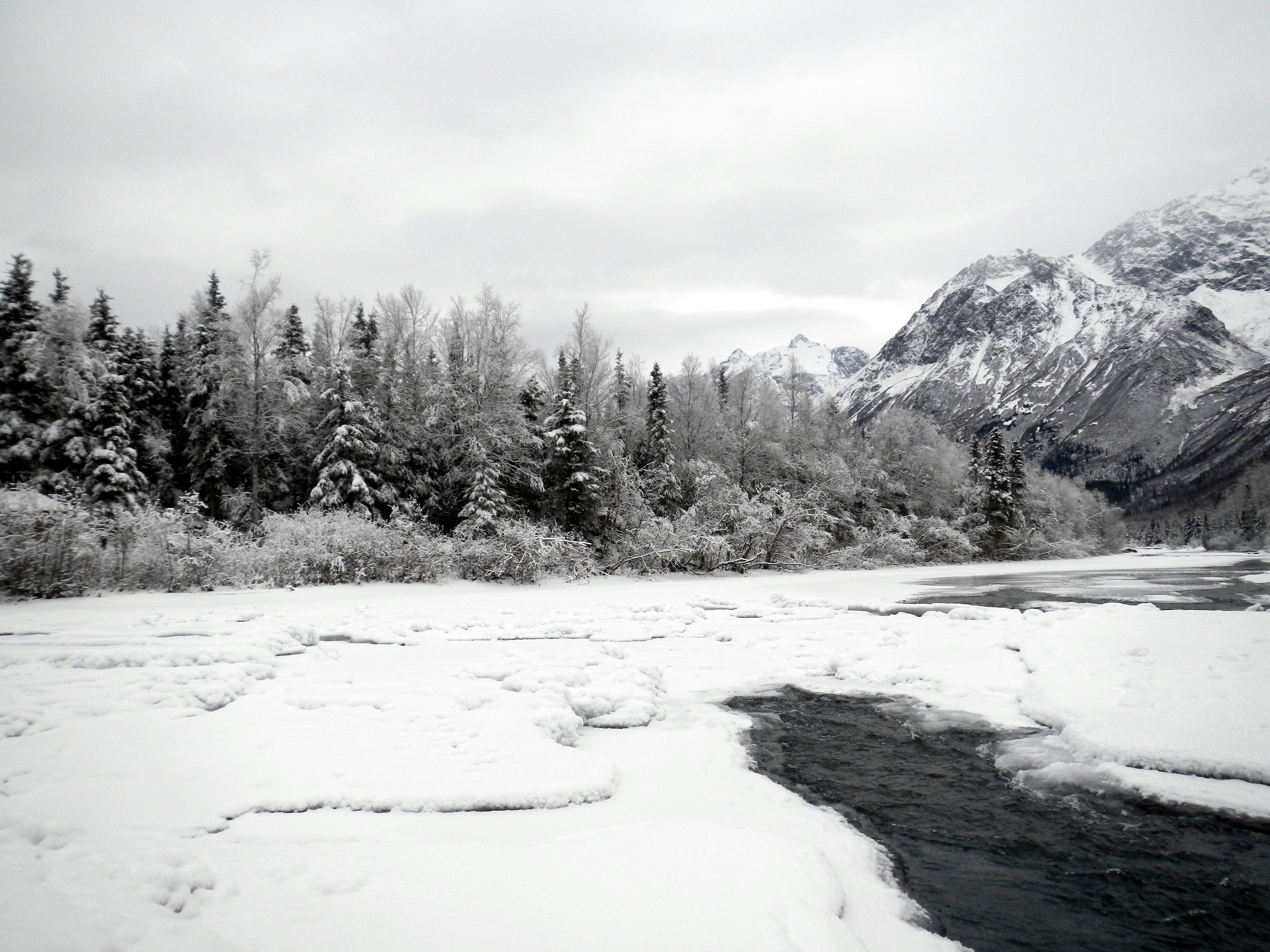
The Eagle River in winter

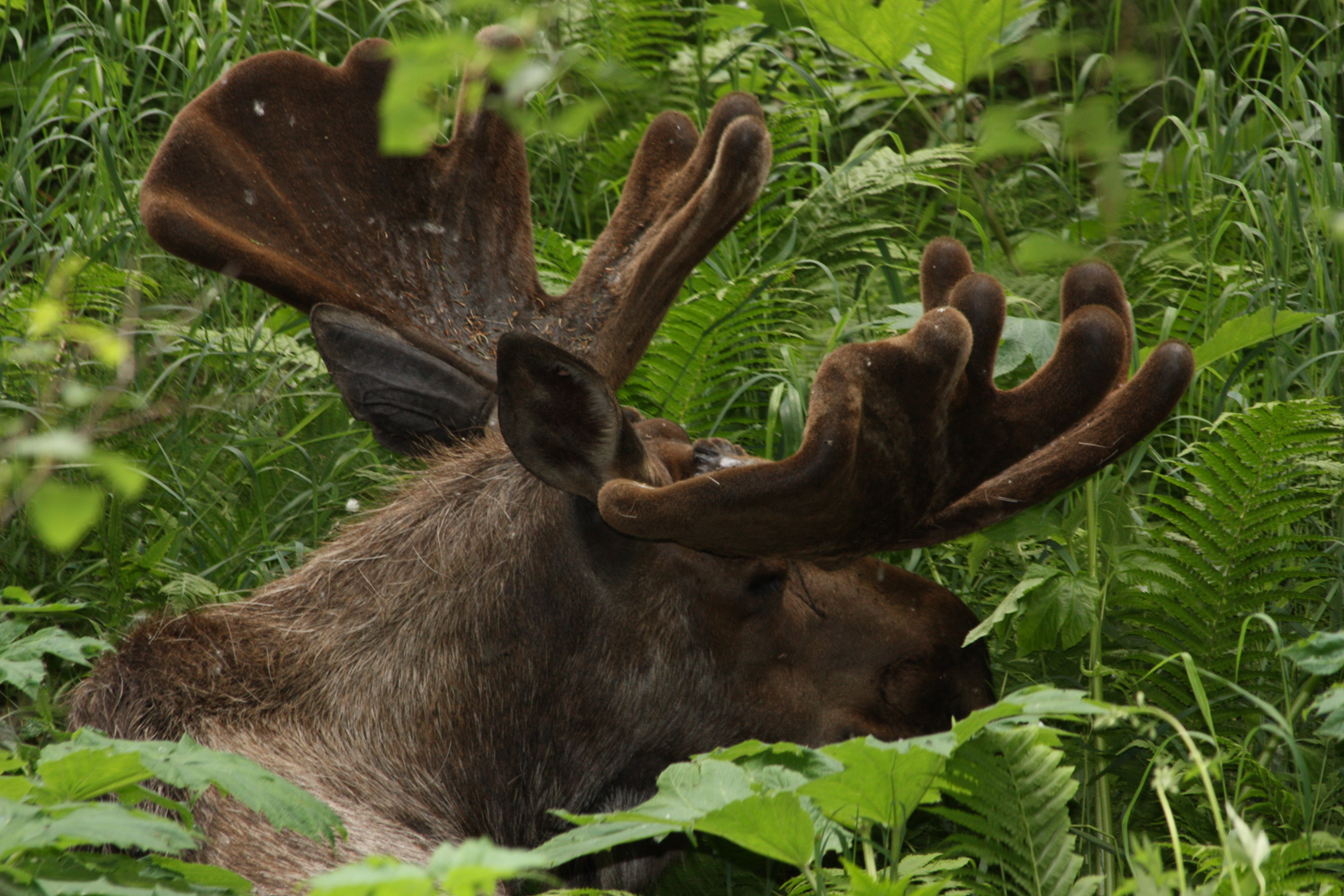
A moose (Alces alces), the state mammal, amidst vegetation along the Albert Loop Trail

A non-profit organization in association with the park operates the Eagle River Nature Center which exhibits interpretive information on wildlife and geological features. The basin of the Eagle River can be accessed by the nearby Albert Loop Trail which passes through three miles (five kilometers) of mixed forests and leads to a river fed by glaciers hidden in the surrounding mountains. At those times in the fall when the park's ursine residents are using the area for their fishing purposes, the trail is closed so as to lessen bear-human interactions. In addition, the Rodak Nature Trail leads to a beaver and salmon viewing deck. From the trail red salmon (Oncorhynchus nerka) and silver salmon (Oncorhynchus kisutch) can be seen as they spawn, especially in August. Brown bears (Ursus arctos) and grizzly bears (Ursus arctos ssp.) often feed on salmon in shallow water between the beaver dams. Hundreds of black bears (Ursus americanus) likewise live in the park. Area streams are excellent for birding as well. The American dipper (Cinclus mexicanus) can be seen during the winter months, which birders will also find a successful time to listen for the great horned owl (Bubo virginianus) and boreal owl (Aegolius funereus). Visitors can rent yurts and cabins along the Eagle River in order to spend time out exploring the scenery and wildlife in the area. Camping is available at the Eagle River Campground.

The Historic Iditarod Trail (or Crow Pass Trail) also passes by the nature center. This popular trail travels 28 miles (45 kilometers) through the park connecting Eagle River and Girdwood as it traverses the Chugach Mountains. Along the first view miles, hikers sometimes see hoary marmots (Marmota caligata) and Arctic ground squirrels (Urocitellus parryii), and occasionally mountain goats (Oreamnos americanus) or Dall sheep (Ovis dalli). Hoary marmots live in alpine meadows, often adjacent to boulders or talus. These creatures hibernate from mid-September until April or early May. In summer, they can be heard making long whistle warning calls. Mountain goats and their kids and Dall sheep with lambs can be seen feeding on slopes above the trail during the late spring and summer.

== Hillside ==
The Hillside Trail System lies only 20 minutes east of downtown Anchorage. A privately run shuttle - Flattop Mountain Shuttle - provides round-trip transportation between downtown and the Glen Alps Trailhead. A wheelchair-accessible walk of a mere quarter mile (0.4 kilometers) from the trailhead leads to a sitting area and viewing deck that overlooks the city and rewards visitors with views of the Cook Inlet and the Alaska Range 80 miles (130 kilometers) in the distance. The trailhead is likewise the primary access to Flattop Mountain, the most hiked peak in the state. During the winter some trails in the area are prone to avalanches. Hikers are encouraged to inquire about current conditions before beginning travel in the area. The Powerline Pass Trail is a popular location for dogsledding and skijoring.

Though moose (Alces alces gigas) may be seen along many of the park's trails, a more predictable and convenient spot is the viewing platform at Glen Alps in fall and early winter. Dozens of moose are often seen below the platform and across the Campbell Creek Valley to the east. Wolves (Canis lupus pambasileus) and Canadian lynx (Lynx canadensis) also live in the park but are seen less frequently. The willow ptarmigan (Lagopus lagopus), Alaska's state bird, as well as the rock ptarmigan (Lagopus muta) and white-tailed ptarmigan (Lagopus leucura) frequent alpine tundra and subalpine shrub thickets. Meadow voles (Microtus pennsylvanicus) by contrast live underground in alpine and tundra habitats. Hikers may hear the chirps of the singing voles (Microtus miurus). During fall, these rodents construct piles of grasses and plants near their burrows.

Smaller mammals inhabiting this area include red foxes, porcupines, hares, ground squirrels, ermines, and pikas.

== Turnagain Arm ==
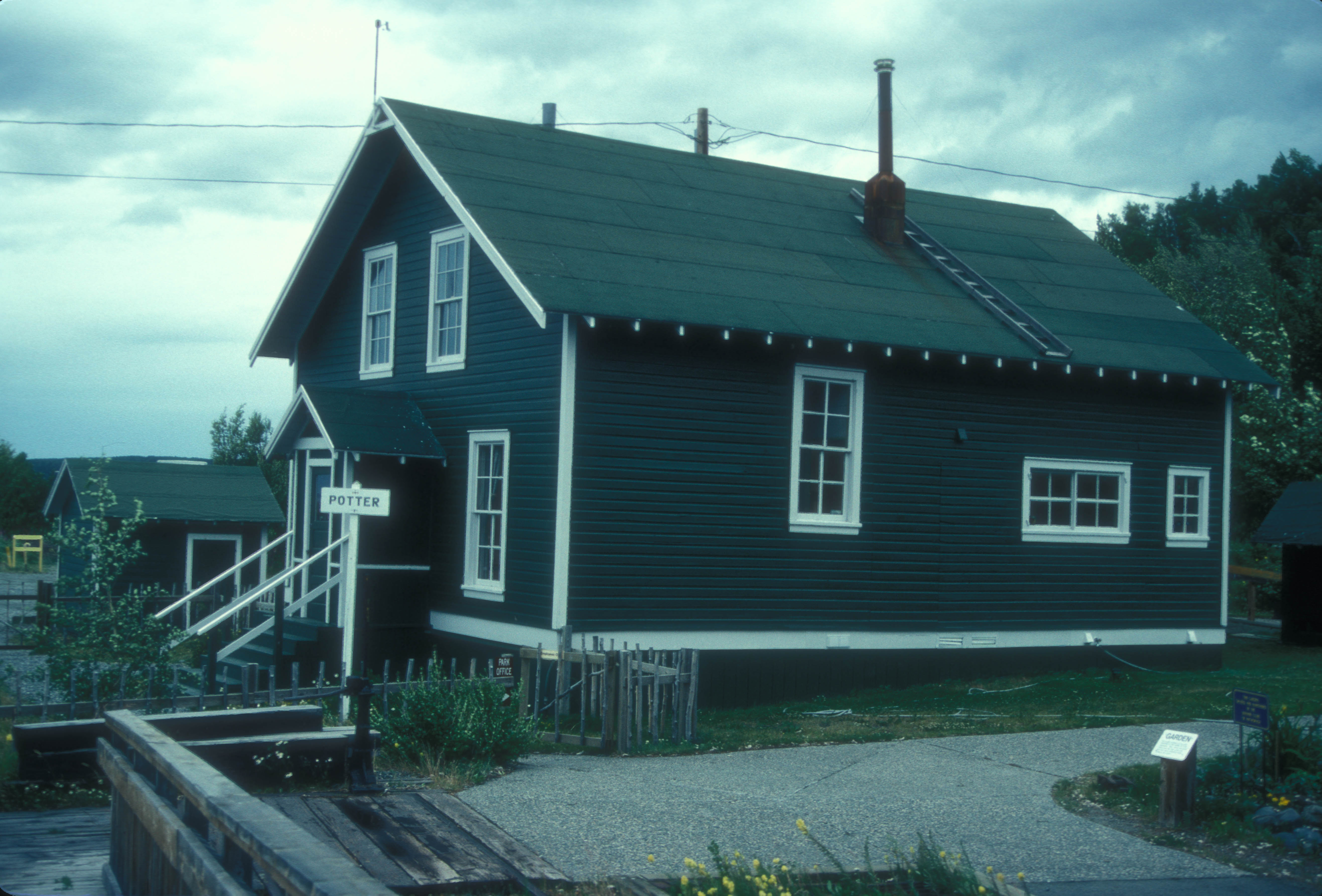
Chugach State Park headquarters located at Potter Section House

The Seward Highway follows part of the southern edge of the park along Turnagain Arm. This stretch of highway is listed as a National Scenic Byway and is designated as an All-American Road. Along Seward Highway is park headquarters located at the Potter Section House State Historic Site which once served as an important worker camp for the Alaska Railroad. There are several viewpoints along the Seward Highway. One of the most visited is Beluga Point, at milemarker 110.5, named for the beluga whales (Delphinapterus leucas) that frequent the area. Another popular viewpoint along the Seward Highway is Windy Corner at milemarker 106 where Dall sheep (Ovis dalli) are often visible just up the hill. The McHugh Creek Day use area features hiking trails and picnic areas. The Bird Creek Campground is located south of Anchorage off the Seward Highway. As with all campgrounds in the park, each camping site boasts a wooded spot for recreation and relaxation, a fire ring and picnic table, with potable water and latrines nearby. Park volunteers at campgrounds and elsewhere offer assistance and answer visitor questions. Firewood is often available nearby for a small fee. Though dirt bikes are prohibited, the Bird Valley Trail System is the only location in the park open to ATVs all year round.

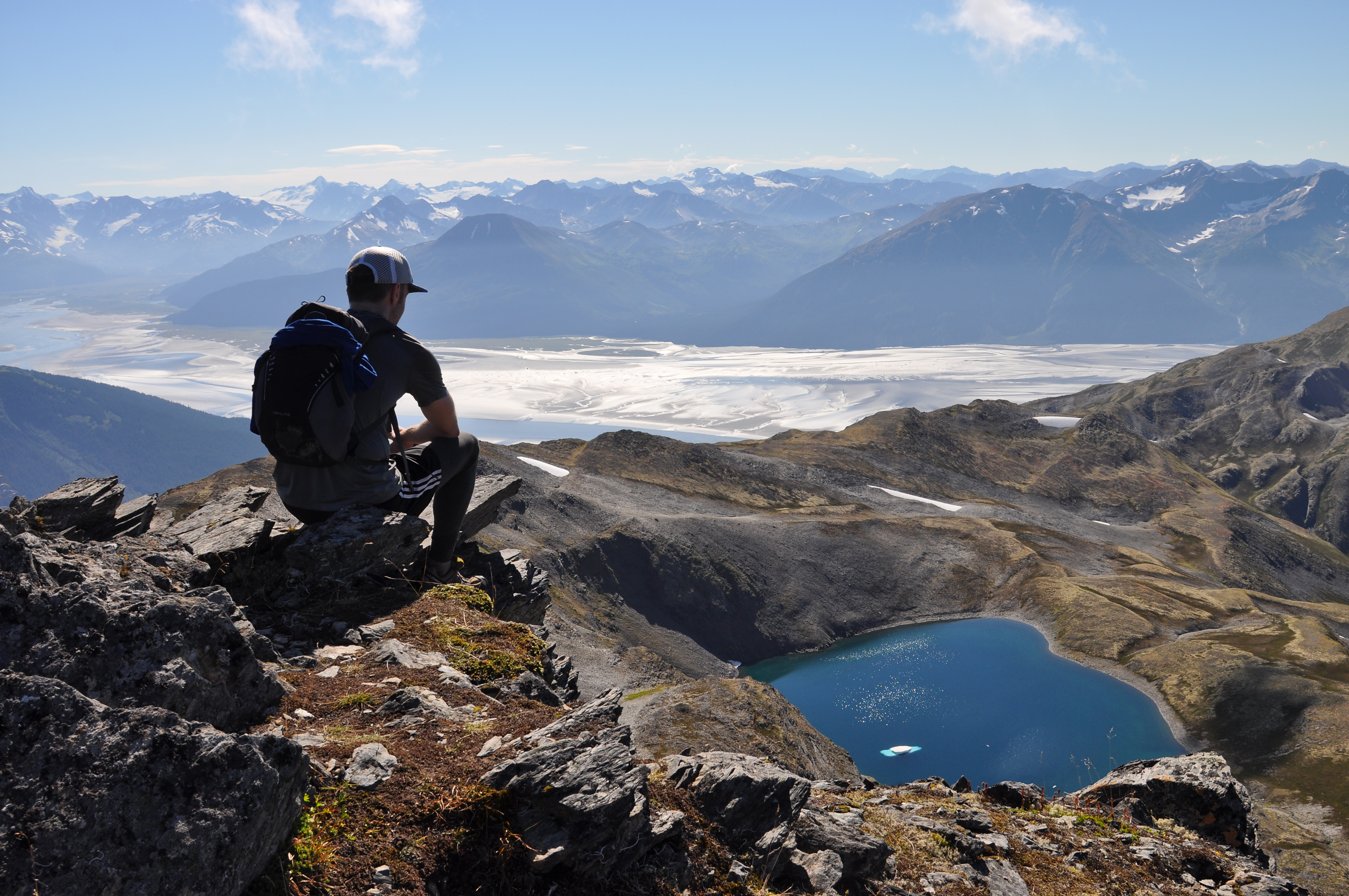
A hiker on the summit of Gentoo Peak, with upper Turnagain Arm in the background. Turnagain Arm is a largely silt-clogged fjord known for its extreme tides (including bore tides), treacherous silt flats, and population of beluga whales.

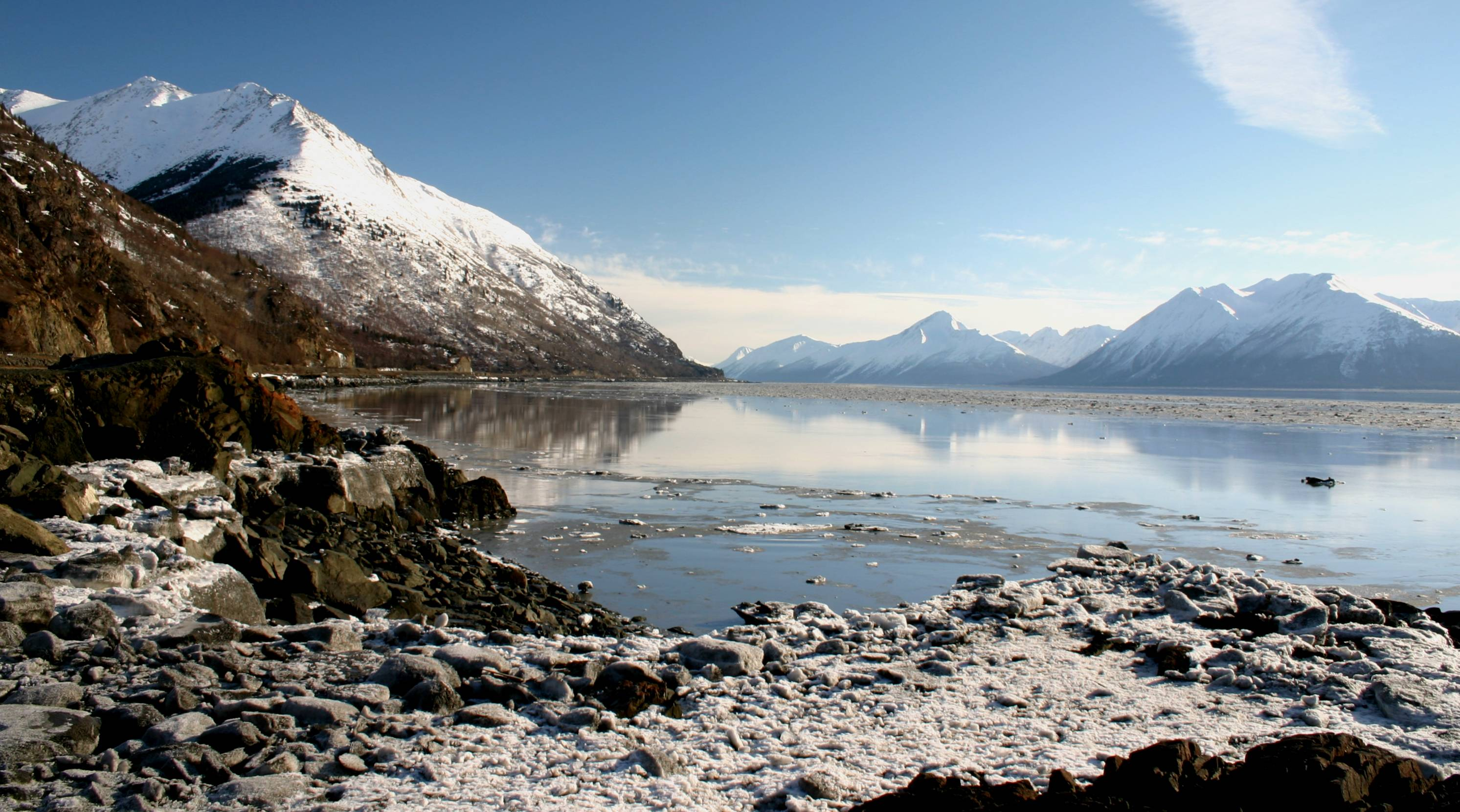
View from Beluga Point, Chugach State Park

Turnagain Arm boasts the second highest tides in North America after the Bay of Fundy. These tides, which can reach 40 feet (12 meters), sometimes come in so quickly that they produce a wave known as a bore tide. Adventurous kayakers and surfers have taken to riding the tide as an extreme sport. Hikers should take care not to get stuck in the quicksand-like mudflats that otherwise make up the beaches along Turnagain Arm. The best place to see the Alaskan bore tide is along Seward Highway south of Anchorage, especially at Bird Point (milemarker 96).

== Bears ==
As a wilderness park within easy driving distance of the largest population center in Alaska, the park has been the site of contacts between bears and humans over the years. Most of the time these encounters end peacefully, but there have been a number of maulings. In 1995 a bear was feeding on a moose kill with its cubs near the McHugh Creek trail when two hikers happened upon them. The sow killed them both. In 2007 a grizzly bear bit a woman at the Eagle River Nature Center. In 2012 a man was mauled while climbing Penguin Peak. In 2014 a brown bear mauled a runner at Bird Point. In 2017 there were two bear attacks in different areas of the park in a matter of days. A brown bear mauled three people at Eagle River and a black bear killed a teenager participating in a trail race at Bird Ridge. The black bear attack was deemed to be a predatory, rather than defensive, attack as the bear refused to leave and circled the corpse when it was located by park rangers.

== Climate ==
Climate data for Glen Alps, Alaska, 1991–2020 normals: 2202ft (671m)
Month	Jan	Feb	Mar	Apr	May	Jun	Jul	Aug	Sep	Oct	Nov	Dec	Year
Mean daily maximum °F (°C)	25.7 (−3.5)	27.3 (−2.6)	28.7 (−1.8)	37.9 (3.3)	48.7 (9.3)	57.1 (13.9)	59.3 (15.2)	57.3 (14.1)	49.2 (9.6)	37.7 (3.2)	29.0 (−1.7)	26.9 (−2.8)	40.4 (4.7)
Daily mean °F (°C)	19.9 (−6.7)	21.6 (−5.8)	22.4 (−5.3)	32.2 (0.1)	42.2 (5.7)	49.9 (9.9)	53.3 (11.8)	51.6 (10.9)	43.7 (6.5)	32.7 (0.4)	23.6 (−4.7)	21.5 (−5.8)	34.6 (1.4)
Mean daily minimum °F (°C)	14.0 (−10.0)	16.0 (−8.9)	16.1 (−8.8)	26.5 (−3.1)	35.7 (2.1)	42.8 (6.0)	47.4 (8.6)	45.8 (7.7)	38.2 (3.4)	27.7 (−2.4)	18.2 (−7.7)	16.0 (−8.9)	28.7 (−1.8)
Average precipitation inches (mm)	1.65 (42)	1.74 (44)	1.76 (45)	1.18 (30)	0.85 (22)	1.23 (31)	2.33 (59)	3.55 (90)	4.34 (110)	2.65 (67)	2.10 (53)	2.64 (67)	26.02 (660)
Average snowfall inches (cm)	19.50 (49.5)	21.50 (54.6)	27.50 (69.9)	11.70 (29.7)	3.30 (8.4)	0.00 (0.00)	0.00 (0.00)	0.00 (0.00)	2.50 (6.4)	14.40 (36.6)	23.90 (60.7)	37.60 (95.5)	161.9 (411.3)
Source: NOAA

== See also ==
- List of Alaska state parks
