= Eklutna Power Plant =

- U.S. National Register of Historic Places
- Alaska Heritage Resources Survey
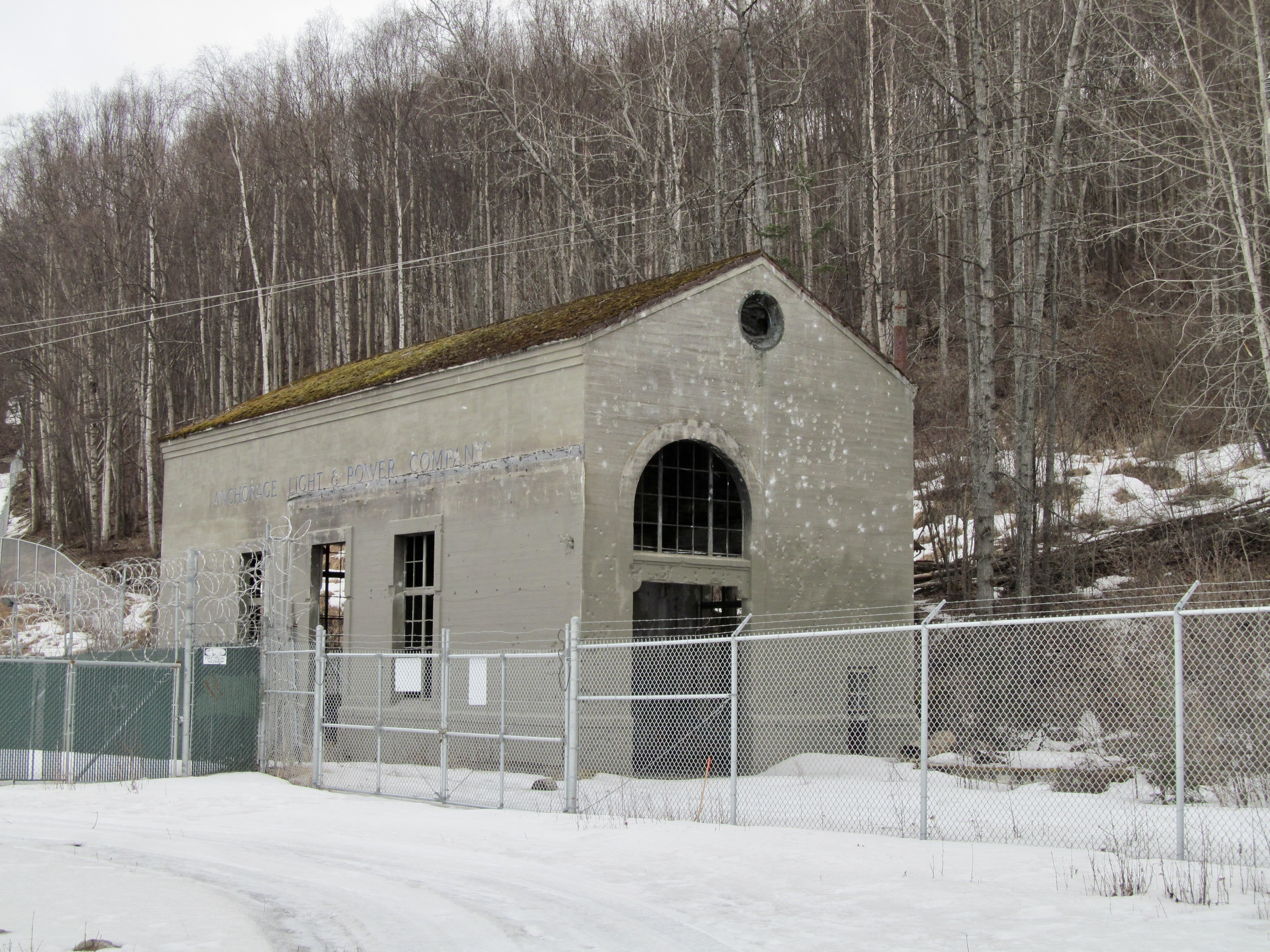

- Location within Alaska
- Nearest city: Anchorage, Alaska
- Coordinates: 61°27′30″N 149°20′24″W
- Area: 20 acres (8.1 ha)
- Built: 1929
- Built by: Jasper & Stacey Company
- NRHP reference No.: 80000746
- AHRS No.: ANC-118

Significant dates
- Added to NRHP: June 20, 1980
- Designated AHRS: October 10, 1976

The Eklutna Power Plant, also referred to as Old Eklutna Power Plant, is a historic hydroelectric power plant on the Eklutna River in Anchorage, Alaska. Located about 5 miles (8.0 km) downstream of the more modern new Eklutna Power Plant, it was built in 1928–29 to provide electrical power to the growing city, and served as its primary power source until 1956. The facilities include two dams, a tunnel and penstock, and a powerhouse. The main dam, Eklutna Dam, located at the northwestern end of Eklutna Lake, was built in 1941 to replace a series of temporary structures built after an earthen dam failed before the plant began operation. The diversion dam, a concrete arch dam, is located 7 miles (11 km) downstream from the lake, and provides facilities for diverting water into the tunnel. The tunnel is 1,900 feet (580 m) long, and is terminated in a penstock, a structure designed to raise the water pressure. The powerhouse is a concrete-and-steel structure completed in 1929. The diversion dam removal was completed in 2018 to allow for the passage of salmon.

The power plant was listed on the National Register of Historic Places in 1980.

== See also ==
- National Register of Historic Places listings in Anchorage, Alaska
