= Eklutna River =

Location
- Country: United States
- State: Alaska

Physical characteristics
- Source
  - location: Eklutna Glacier
  - coordinates: 61°16′05″N 148°59′19″W
- Mouth
  - location: Cook Inlet, at Anchorage, Alaska
  - coordinates: 61°27′29″N 149°25′08″W
- Length: 22 mi (35 km)

The Eklutna River (/iːˈkluːtnə/) is approximately 11.8 miles (19.0 km) long and is located in the Southcentral region of the U.S. state of Alaska. A portion of the river flows through a canyon up to 400 feet (120 m) deep, emptying into the Knik Arm of Cook Inlet approximately 17 miles (27 km) northeast of Anchorage. This degraded anadromous stream historically originated from Eklutna Lake, which itself is fed by Eklutna Glacier. Eklutna River is now fed primarily by groundwater before being joined by Thunderbird Creek. Thunderbird Creek, which enters the south bank about 1 km (0.62 mi) upstream from where the river exits the canyon and forms an alluvial fan. Due to water impoundments on the Eklutna River for power generation, Thunderbird Creek is currently the main source of water in the lower portion of the Eklutna River. The river is located entirely within the limits of the Municipality of Anchorage.

== Upper dam ==
Military expansion in Anchorage during the 1940s stressed the capacity of the Eklutna power generation system and it was upgraded several times. In 1948 the Bureau of Reclamation recommended the construction of Upper Eklutna Dam to raise the level of Eklutna Lake to an elevation of 875 feet (267 m) above sea level with a tunnel intake at 830 feet (250 m). Construction was completed in 1955. The new system replaced the aging storage dam at the lake outlet with a new dam that diverted water through a 4.5-mile (7.2 km) long, 9-foot (2.7 m) diameter concrete lined tunnel with a capacity of 640 cubic feet per second (18 m^{3}/s) to a turbine house on the south bank of the Knik River. The dam, as modified, is an earth- and rock-filled structure, 555 feet (169 m) long and contains approximately 5,000 cubic yards (3,800 m^{3}) of material. This new plant used essentially the entire storage capacity of Eklutna Lake and no water was made available to operate the existing plant at Eklutna.

The 1964 Good Friday earthquake severely damaged the dam. Because of this, a new storage dam was built downstream from the existing storage dam at the lake outlet. The new Eklutna Dam (referred to as the Upper Dam) is an earth and rockfill structure 815 feet (248 m) long and 51 feet (16 m) high containing 85,000 yd^{3} (65,000 m^{3}) of material. The spillway is a rectangular concrete conduit through the dam with an uncontrolled overflow crest. The maximum capacity of the spillway is 3,315 cu ft/s (93.9 m^{3}/s). There are no outlet works through the dam, as the power tunnel serves in that capacity. As the Upper Dam impounds 100% of the flow from Eklutna Lake, the river's volume immediately downstream is zero.

== Lower dam ==
Anchorage was largely electrified by the late 1920s, but as demand increased, Eklutna was selected as a power source because of the hydroelectric potential of the river, then known as Eklutna Creek, and Eklutna Lake. In 1927, the City of Anchorage contracted with the Anchorage Light and Power Company to construct what is now called the Old Eklutna Hydroplant. Construction included a low-head storage dam at the outlet of Eklutna Lake and a 68-foot (21 m) high concrete arch diversion dam (known as the Lower Dam) in the river canyon 8 miles (13 km) downstream of the lake. The diversion dam diverted water through a 1/4 mile-long tunnel to a turbine house near the village of Eklutna. Since its construction, the Lower Eklutna Dam had been a barrier to fish passage. When the Upper Dam was brought online, the Lower Dam was shut down as a result and the Lower Eklutna Dam was allowed to fill with gravel. No longer operational, this dam gradually backfilled upstream for 0.6 miles (0.97 km) with 230,000 cubic yards (180,000 m^{3}) of sediment. In 2018 the old dam was removed entirely as part of a restoration project.

== Lower dam removal ==
Eklutna Inc. raised $7.5 million for the removal of the Lower Eklutna dam to restore fish and wildlife habitat and fish passage in this section of the Eklutna watershed. After the dam was removed in the summer of 2018, Eklutna Inc. began their mandated 3-year post-project monitoring. These monitoring efforts are presently ongoing in partnership with the Alaska Department of Fish and Game. The removal of the Lower Eklutna dam was funded largely by the Conservation Fund, but had many other contributors including Trout Unlimited, the Open Rivers Fund of Resources Legacy Fund, Patagonia, New Belgium Brewing, the Marnell Company, the Rasmusson Foundation, the Alaska Community Foundation, the M.J. Murdock Trust, the National Fish and Wildlife Foundation through its Alaska Fish and Wildlife Fund, ConocoPhillips SPIRIT of Conservation Program, Wells Fargo, the Pacific Coastal Salmon Recovery Fund (PCSRF), a congressional grant managed by NOAA Fisheries West Coast Region.

== 1991 Fish & Wildlife Agreement ==
In 1997 the Purchasers (Chugach Electric Association, Municipal Light and Power [ML&P], and Matanuska Electric Association [MEA]) of the Eklutna Hydroelectric Project signed the 1991 Fish & Wildlife Agreement. This agreement "commits the Purchasers to fund studies to determine impacts and propose measures for protection, mitigation, and enhancement of fish and wildlife affected by the projects", with the goal of informing the Governor of Alaska on their designation of a Fish and Wildlife Program for the Eklutna Project. The governor must have this proposal by the year 2024 (25 years after the Eklutna Project transaction date) and have completed the new program's implementation by 2032. Research to assess current status and causes of fish and wildlife degradation are ongoing.

== Water Rights in the Eklutna Watershed ==
The Native Village of Eklutna (NVE) has applied for three different water rights permits. Together the three segments would encompass three miles of the Lower Eklutna River above the confluence with Thunderbird Creek and to the outlet of the river into Knik Arm, as well as Thunderbird Creek itself. These permits would support fish and wildlife by reserving in-stream flow.

== Salmon in the Eklutna Watershed ==
When the Lower Eklutna dam was constructed there was no consideration for its effects on fish and wildlife. It was later determined that the dam blocked existing sockeye from the accessing their spawning grounds within the greater Eklutna watershed. As late as the mid-1980s native land-locked sockeye (also known as Kokanee) were observed within Eklutna Lake and are assumed to be remnants of the extirpated sockeye population. Presently, five species of salmon return to the Lower Eklutna River and spawn primarily in its main tributary, Thunderbird Creek [cite]. Salmon smolts, namely Chinook (Oncorhynchus tshawytscha) and Coho (Oncorhynchus kisutch), have been observed using the Lower Eklutna River habitat above its confluence with Thunderbird Creek, as far upstream as the dam removal site. There has not been spawning activity observed above the confluence and it is likely that spawning gravels in this portion of the watershed would freeze during the winter due to low flow.

In September 2021, for the first time in 92 years, water began flowing from the lake down the natural course of the river. It is hoped that returning flow to the upper river will lead to the return of salmon spawning there. The process of regulating the flow and establishing an optimal level could take several years.

== See also ==
- Eklutna, Alaska
- List of rivers of Alaska
