= Beluga Point Site =

Archaeological site in Alaska, United States

- U.S. National Register of Historic Places
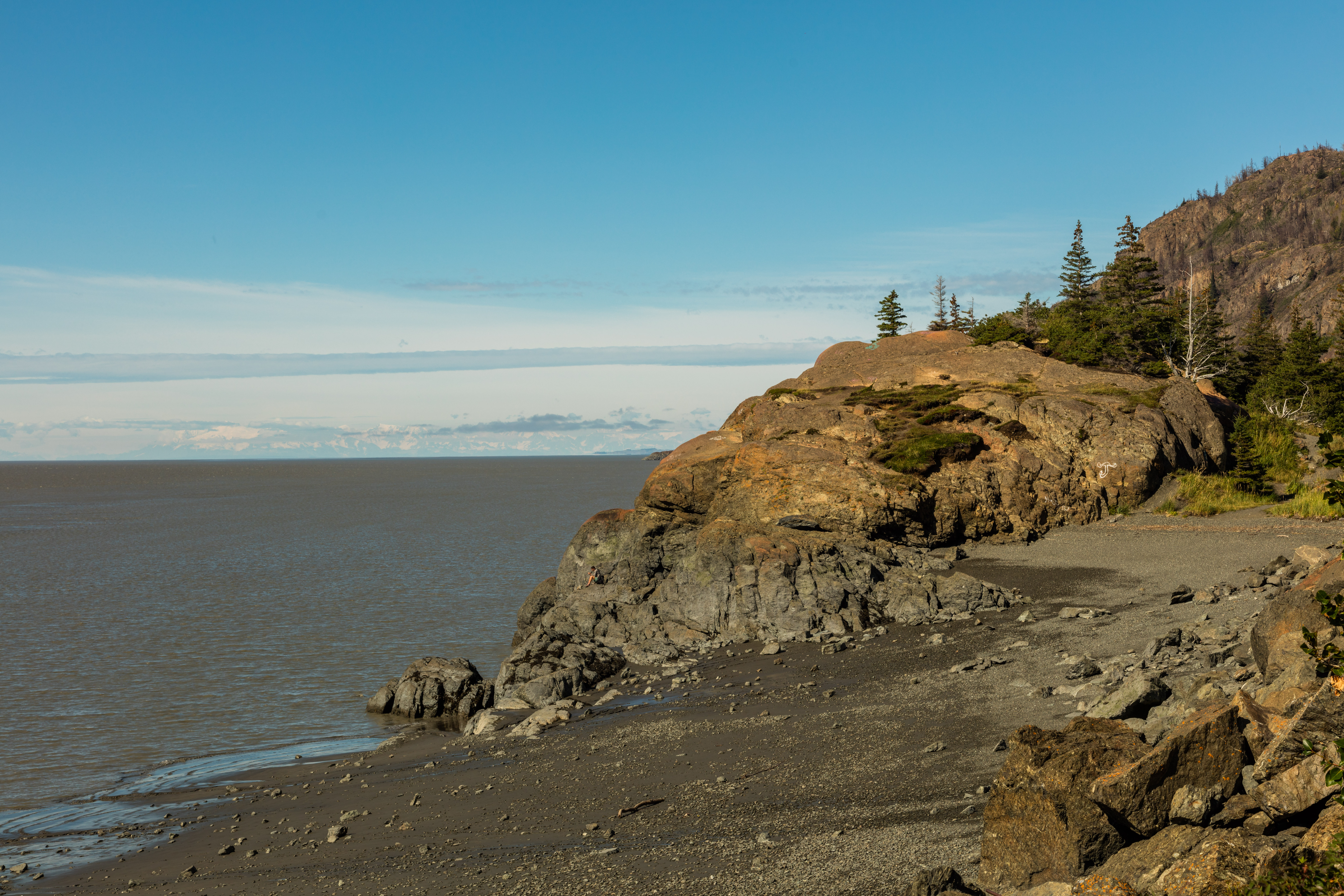
- Beluga Point Site

- Location within Alaska
- Location: Anchorage, Alaska
- Coordinates: 61°0′19″N 149°41′39″W
- NRHP reference No.: 78000515
- Added to NRHP: March 30, 1978

Beluga Point Site (49ANC-054) is an archaeological location along Turnagain Arm of Cook Inlet, near Seward Highway Milepost 110, south of Anchorage, Alaska. It was added to the National Register of Historic Places on March 30, 1978.

Artifacts of the area are evidence of early human habitation. Beluga Point North 1 (BPN1) artifacts are 8,000–10,000 years old and believed to be evidence of the oldest habitation in Anchorage municipality. Various other artifacts at Beluga Point South 1 and 2 (BPS1 and BPS2) are believed to be 3,500 to 4,000 years old, while some newer ones are dated at 600 to 800 years old.

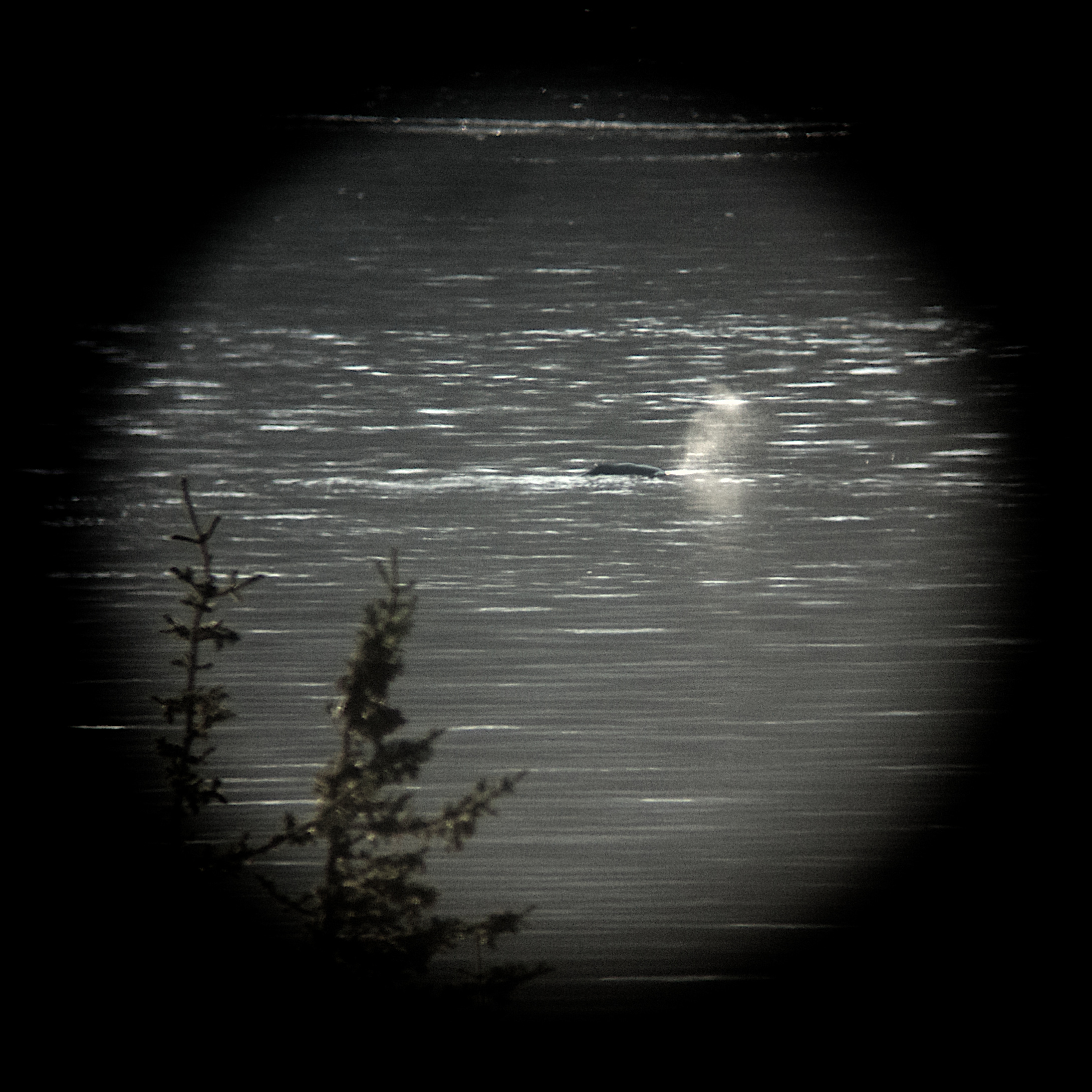
A photo taken through binoculars at Beluga Point showing a breaching beluga whale.

Beluga Point is also a wildlife viewing area under the jurisdiction of the Alaska Department of Fish and Game. Beluga whales can be sighted seasonly July through August as hundreds of the cetaceans visit Cook Inlet to feed on the Pacific salmon run.

== See also ==
- National Register of Historic Places listings in Anchorage, Alaska
