= Eklutna Lake =

Reservoir in Alaska, U.S.

- Eklootna Lake
- Idlu Bena (Denaʼina)
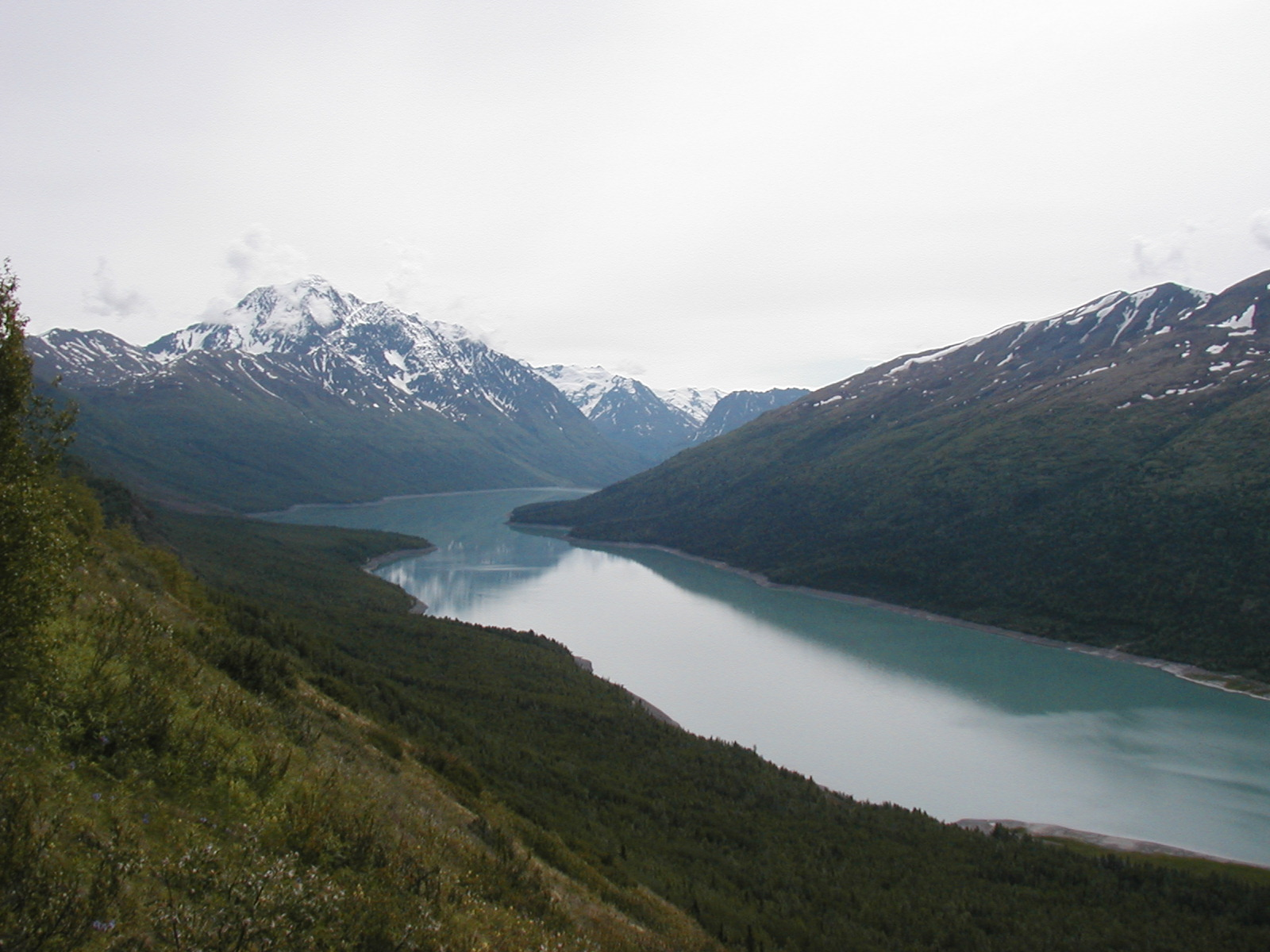

- Location within Alaska Location within North America
- Coordinates: 61.381°N 149.045°W
- Primary inflows: Eklutna River
- Primary outflows: Eklutna River
- Basin countries: United States
- Designation: Reservoir
- Max. length: 7 miles (11 km)
- Max. width: 1 mile (1.6 km)
- Surface area: 1,424.5 hectares (3,520 acres)
- Max. depth: 91.4 meters (300 ft)
- Surface elevation: 840 feet (260 m)

Eklutna Lake (Dena'ina: Idlu Bena) is a 1,424.5 hectares (3,520 acres) lake in the Municipality of Anchorage, Alaska, near the village of Eklutna. It is located entirely inside Chugach State Park and is about 1 mile (1.6 km) wide and 7 miles (11 km) in length.

== Access ==
The only land access is by Eklutna Lake Road, which is described as "narrow and winding with no shoulders". Only unpowered boats and electric trolling motors are permitted, and there is no boat launch ramp. There is a small airstrip at the south end of the lake.

== Dam ==
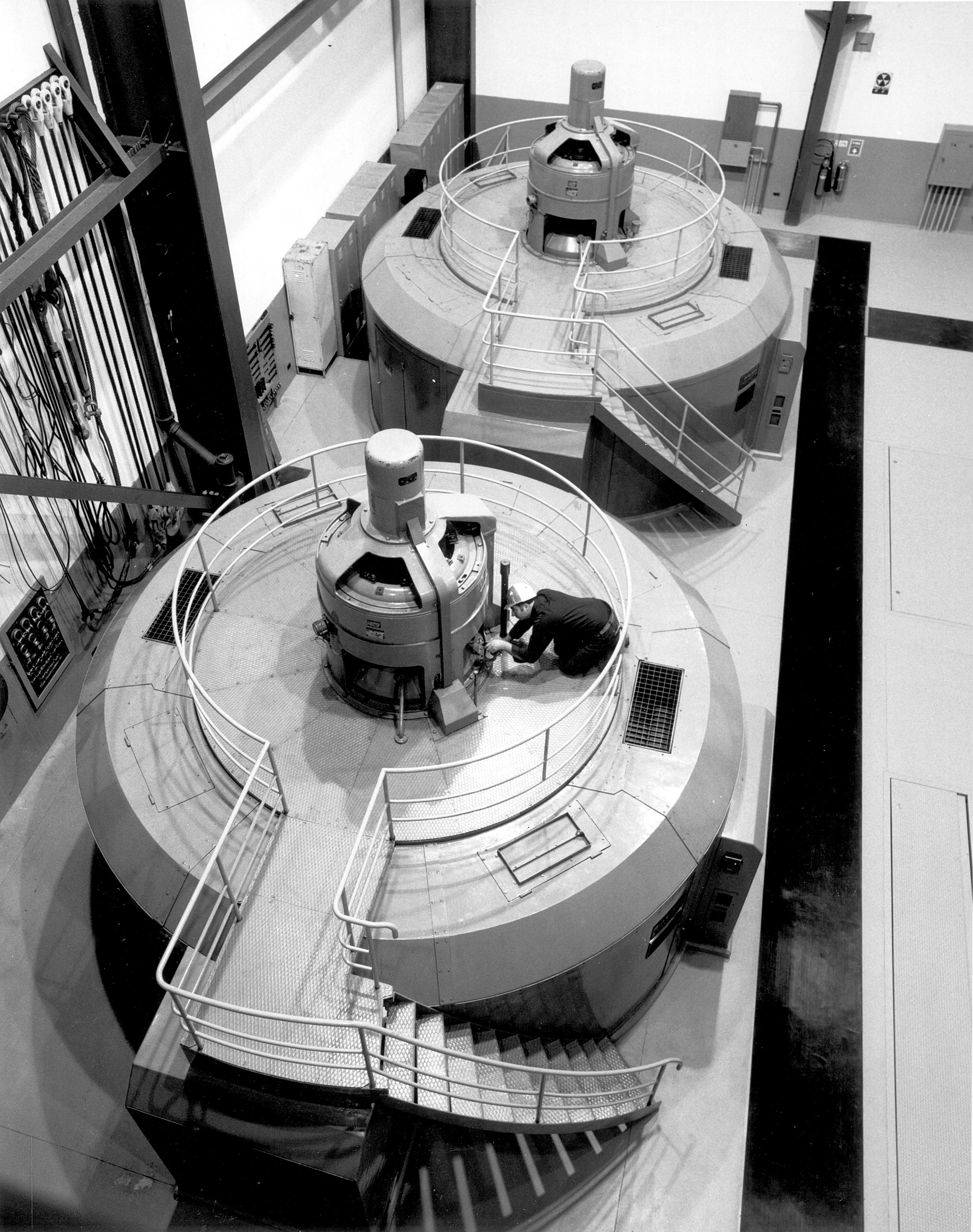
generators powered by water flow diverted from the lake

As a reservoir, the lake is the main source of Anchorage's drinking water and a major source of electricity via a hydroelectric dam that diverts almost all of the water that used to comprise the Eklutna River. The agencies that own the dam are required to begin restoring the river by 2027, and completely restore it by 2032. With the removal of an older, unused diversion dam downstream there is interest in restoring the previous water flow back to the river sooner rather than waiting, in order to provide anadromous salmon habitat, an effort supported by nonprofit groups and U.S. Representative Don Young.

== Recreation ==
The lake contains sizable populations of Kokanee salmon and Dolly Varden trout. Park facilities around the lake include a large campground, picnic areas, and a substantial trail system providing access to backcountry and Eklutna Glacier, the source of the lake and river.
