= Knik River =

Watercourse in the United States

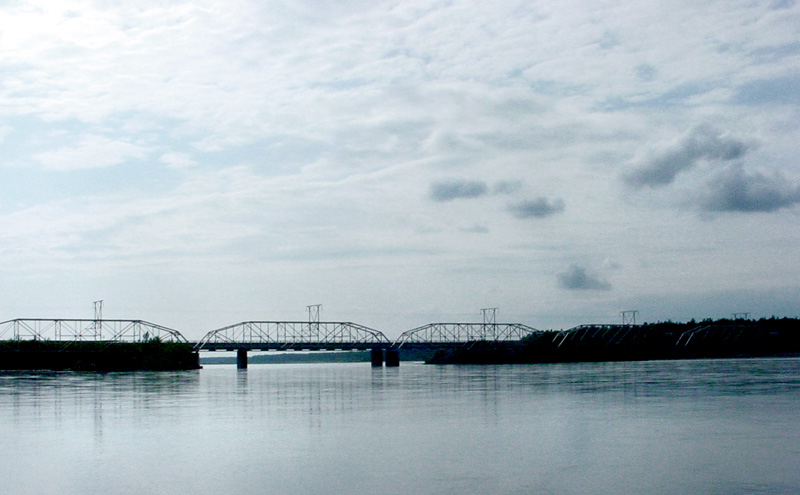
- Railroad bridge on Knik River, from the Glenn Highway

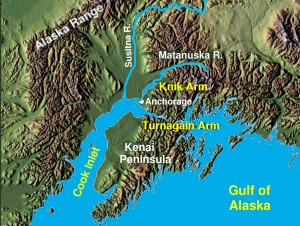
- Native name: Skitnu (Denaʼina)

Physical characteristics
- Source
  - location: Knik Glacier
  - coordinates: 61°24′25″N 148°34′00″W
  - elevation: 400 ft (120 m) drop
- Mouth
  - location: Cook Inlet, at Anchorage / Matanuska-Susitna Borough
- Length: 25 miles (40 km)
- Discharge
  - average: 1,500–60,000 cu ft/s (42–1,699 m^{3}/s)

Basin features
- Tributaries
  - left: Hunter Creek, Goat Creek, Eklutna Tailrace
  - right: Metal creek, Friday Creek, Jim Creek, Bodenburg Creek

The Knik River /kˈnɪk/ (Dena'ina: Skitnu; Ahtna: Scitna’) is a 25-mile-long (40 km) river in the U.S. state of Alaska. Its source is at Knik Glacier, from which it flows northwest and west and empties into the head of Cook Inlet's Knik Arm, near the mouth of the Matanuska River. It is bridged twice (old and new bridges) where the Old Glenn Highway crosses it near the Butte, and also bridged on the Hayflats.

It is characterized by a broad flat plain with a bed of finely ground gravel and sand and silt. During windstorms, large quantities of fine material is blown from the riverbed and deposited in locations generally downstream or west. The river itself is relatively shallow and wide and considered a class I float. It drops about 400 feet (120 m) from the glacier to the salt water, or roughly 16 feet (4.9 m) per mile. The 4 miles (6.4 km) above the hayflats bridge is unusual in that it remains unfrozen most winters because the Eklutna project discharges warmer water into the tailrace. Discharge normally is about 5000 to 6000 ft3/s in the summer (140 to 170 m3/s), with floods of 60,000 ft3/s (1700 m3/s) or more not uncommon.

The term "knik," present in the names of the river, the arm of Cook Inlet, and the glacier, as well as the communities of Knik-Fairview and Knik River, derives from the Inupiaq word igniq ("fire"). The Denaina term for the Knik river was "Skitnu", (meaning Brush River).

The river runs near the border between the Matanuska-Susitna Borough and the Municipality of Anchorage. Much of its length is paralleled by the paved Old Glenn Highway and the paved (as of 2000) Knik River Road, along which can be found the community of Knik River.

== See also ==
- List of rivers of Alaska
