= Mount Muir (Alaska) =

Prominent mountain summit in Alaska, USA

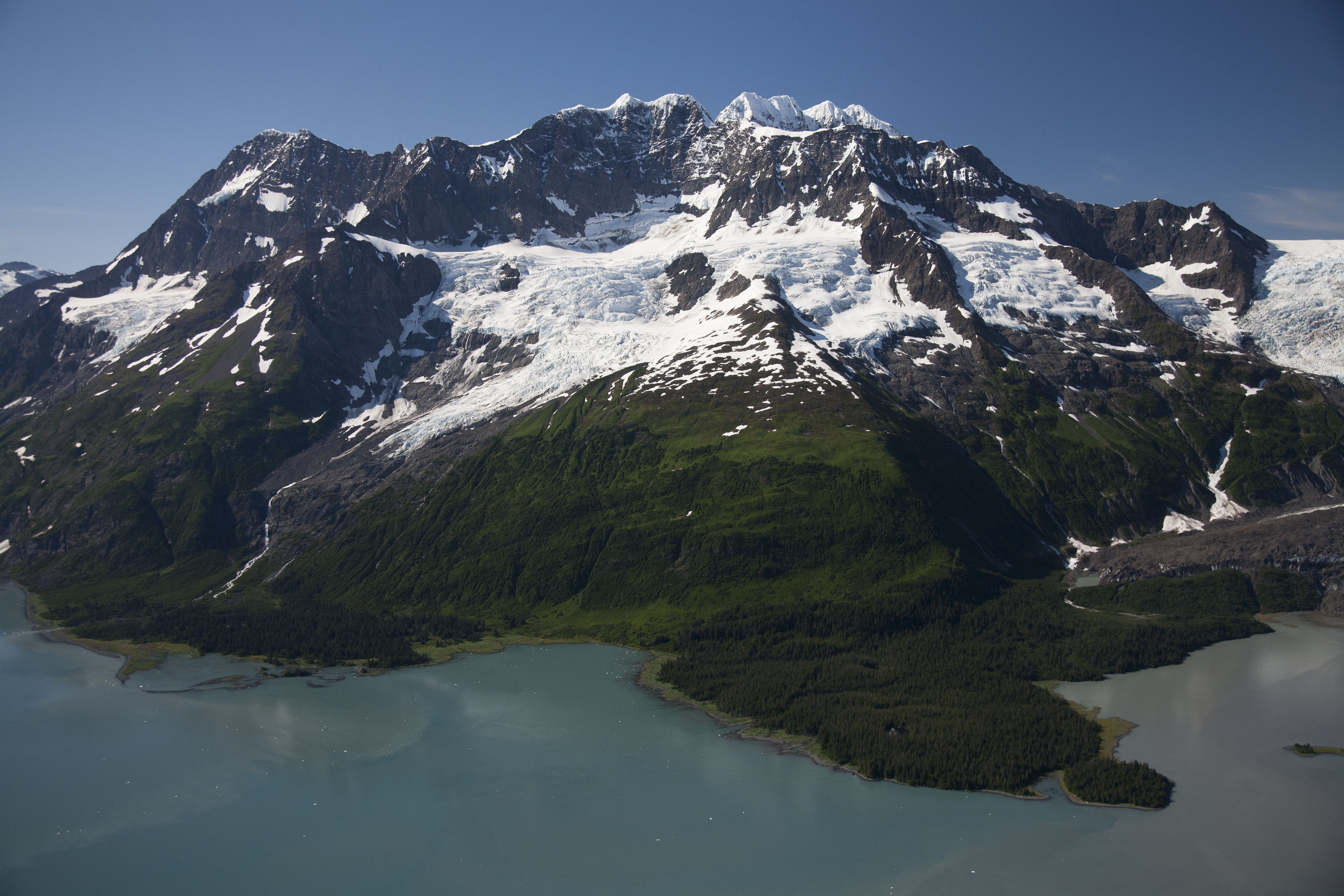
- Aerial view of Mount Muir above Harriman Fiord

Highest point
- Elevation: 7,605 ft (2,318 m)
- Prominence: 3,405 ft (1,038 m)
- Parent peak: Mount Gilbert (9,638 ft)
- Listing: Mountains of Alaska
- Coordinates: 61°06′28″N 148°22′52″W

Geography
- Location within Alaska
- Interactive map of Mount Muir
- Location: Chugach National Forest; Chugach Census Area; Alaska, United States
- Parent range: Chugach Mountains
- Topo map: USGS Anchorage A-4

Mount Muir is a prominent 7,605-foot (2,318 m) glaciated mountain summit located in the Chugach Mountains, in Chugach National Forest, in the U.S. state of Alaska, approximately 4 km (2.5 mi) north of Harriman Fjord in Prince William Sound.

== Etymology and history ==
The mountain was named in 1908 by geologists Grant and Higgins and officially adopted in 1910 by the United States Geological Survey, probably after of the American naturalist, conservationist and writer John Muir (1838–1914), who visited the Alaska area four times, including as a member of the 1899 Harriman Alaska expedition that explored this immediate area. The first recorded ascent of Mount Muir was completed in April 2014 by climbers Ryan Fisher and Nathan Lane via the north face.

== Geography and physical features ==
Mount Muir is situated in the northern reaches of the Chugach Mountains, near the edge of the Chugach National Forest. It serves as the origin point for several glaciers, including the Penniman Glaciers, Baker Glacier, Detached Glacier, and the Colony Glacier. The Colony Glacier flows northward, draining into Inner Lake George, while the others are hanging glaciers on the mountain's southern slopes, descending toward Harriman Fjord.

Significant prominences relative to Mount Muir include:

| Mountain | Elevation (m) | Range | Coordinates | Distance (km) | Prominence (m) |
|---|---|---|---|---|---|
| Mount Gannett | 2,919 | Chugach Mountains | 61°14′32″N 148°11′36″W | 18 | 1,310 |
| Denali | 6,190 | Alaska Range | 63°4′10″N 151°9′26″W | 258 | 6,140 |
| Mount Everest | 8,848 | Himalaya | 27°59′17″N 86°55′31″W | 8,949 | 8,848 |

=== Nearby glaciers ===
The following glaciers are located near Mount Muir:

| Glacier | Elevation at coordinates (m) | Coordinates | Distance and direction from Mount Muir |
|---|---|---|---|
| Detached Glacier | 1,142 | 61°4′22″N 148°23′46″W | 4 km (2.5 mi) south |
| Penniman Glaciers | 1,208 | 61°5′42″N 148°20′24″W | 3 km (1.9 mi) south |
| Ghiacciai Penniman | 924 | 61°4′37″N 148°29′15″W | 7 km (4.3 mi) southwest |
| Surprise Glacier | 713 | 61°1′5″N 148°29′46″W | 6 km (3.7 mi) south |
| Baker Glacier | 1,141 | 61°4′53″N 148°21′52″W | 3 km (1.9 mi) south |
| Serpentine Glacier | 553 | 61°7′41″N 148°16′2″W | 4 km (2.5 mi) east |
| Colony Glacier | 316 | 61°14′22″N 148°30′27″W | 1 km (0.62 mi) west |

=== Nearby mountains ===
Mount Muir is surrounded by the following peaks, all within the Chugach Mountains:

| Mountain | Elevation (m) | Coordinates | Distance and direction from Mount Muir |
|---|---|---|---|
| Mount Doran | 1,057 | 61°1′11″N 148°14′22″W | 12 km (7.5 mi) southeast |
| Mount Gilbert | 2,682 | 61°10′21″N 148°16′6″W | 9 km (5.6 mi) northeast |
| Mount Curtis | 1,152 | 61°4′34″N 148°5′40″W | 16 km (9.9 mi) east |
| Globemaster Peak | 2,724 | 61°12′53″N 148°12′9″W | 15 km (9.3 mi) northeast |
| Mount Coville | 1,310 | 61°7′11″N 148°4′27″W | 16 km (9.9 mi) east |
| Mount Gannett | 2,919 | 61°14′32″N 148°11′36″W | 18 km (11 mi) northeast |

== Climate ==
Based on the Köppen climate classification, Mount Muir is located in a subarctic climate zone with long, cold, snowy winters, and mild summers. Temperatures can drop below −20 °C with wind chill factors below −30 °C. This climate supports the Baker Glacier, Penniman Glaciers, and Detached Glacier on its south slopes, and tributaries of the Colony Glacier on its north, east, and west aspects. May and June are the best months for climbing in terms of favorable weather.

== Access and tourism ==
Mount Muir is prominently visible from Harriman Fjord, accessible only by sea from Whittier (approximately 60 km (37 mi) by sea or 26 km (16 mi) by air) or Valdez (over 150 km (93 mi) by sea). Distances are derived from Google Earth. During the tourist season, boat excursions from Whittier offer views of the Surprise Glacier and the Penniman, Baker, and Detached Glaciers on the mountain's slopes.

== Gallery ==
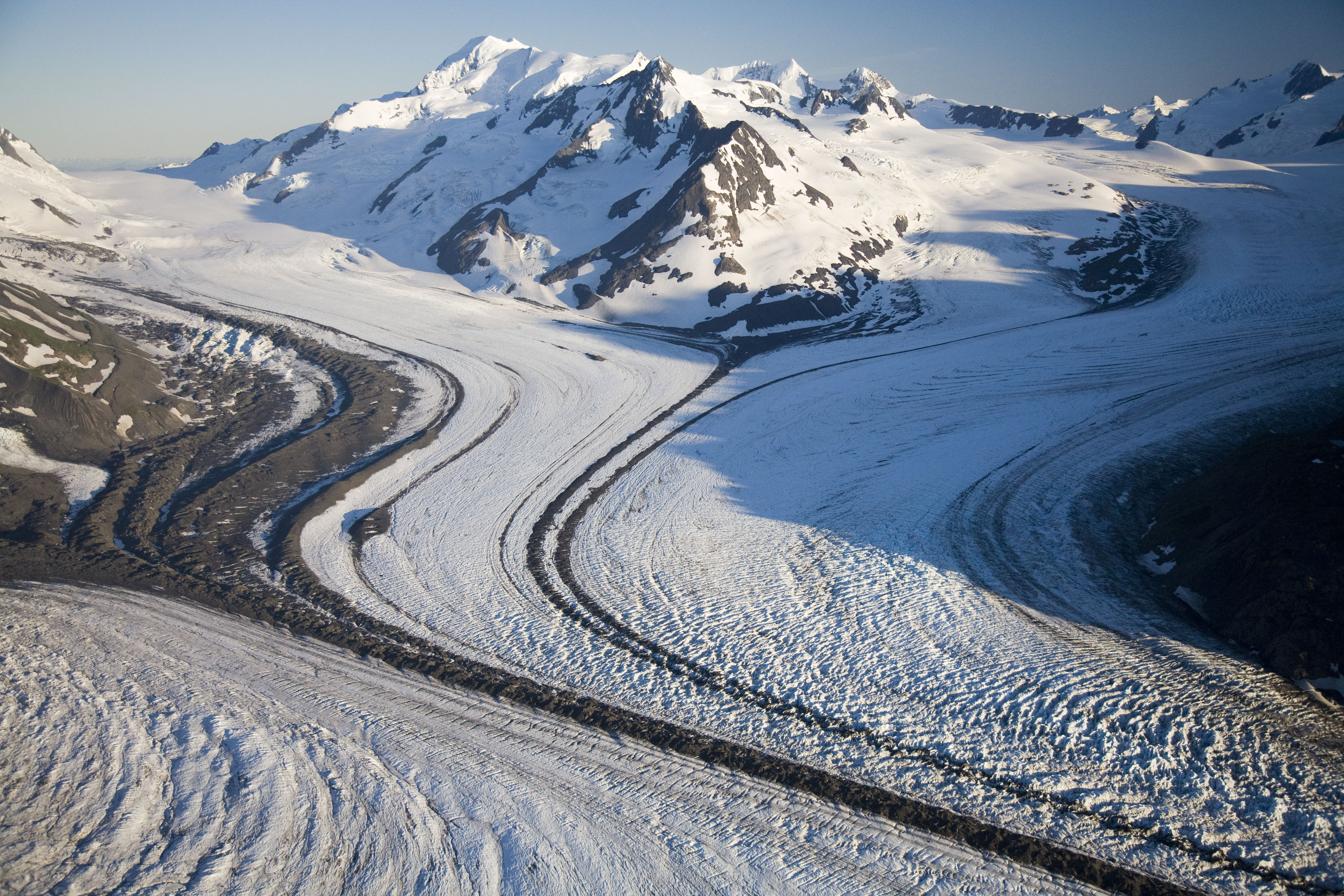
Mt. Muir seen from the north with Colony Glacier

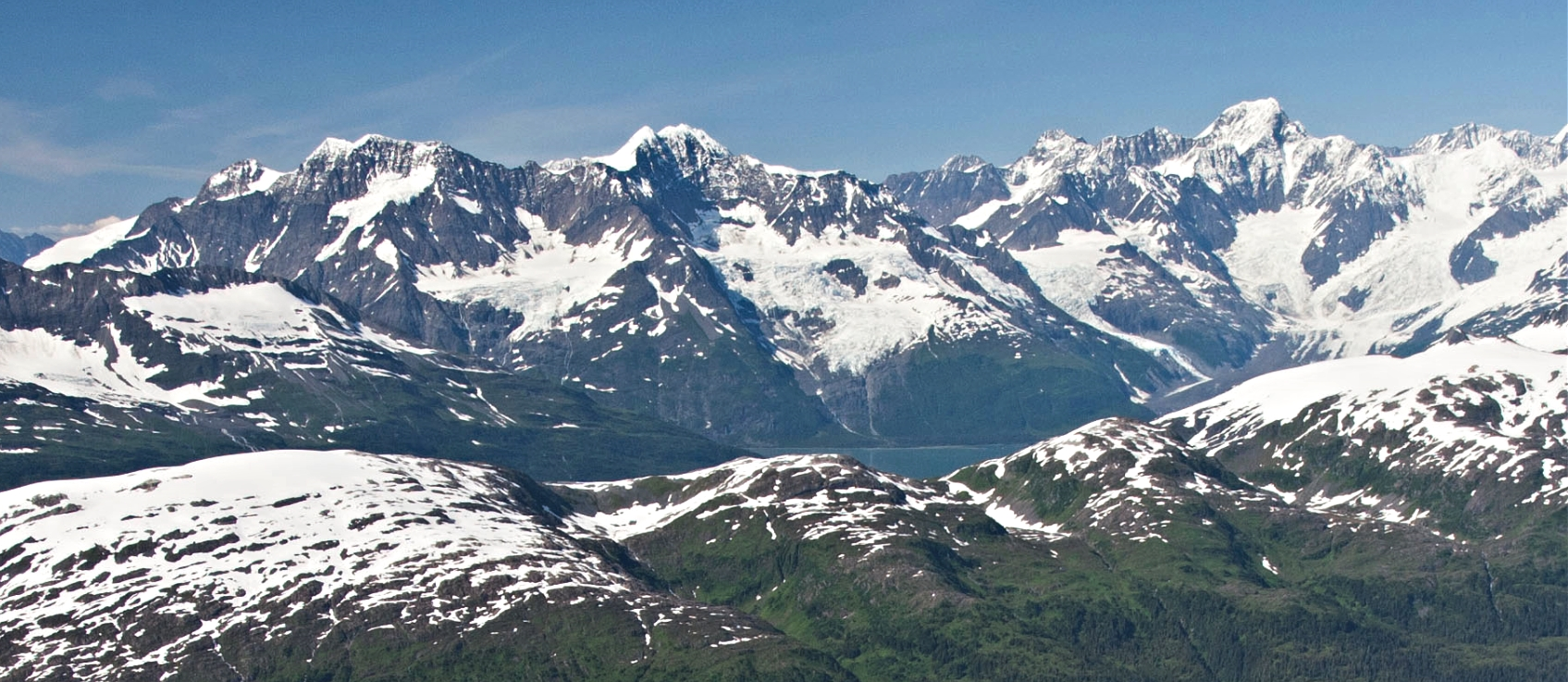
Mount Muir centered, with Mount Gilbert to right

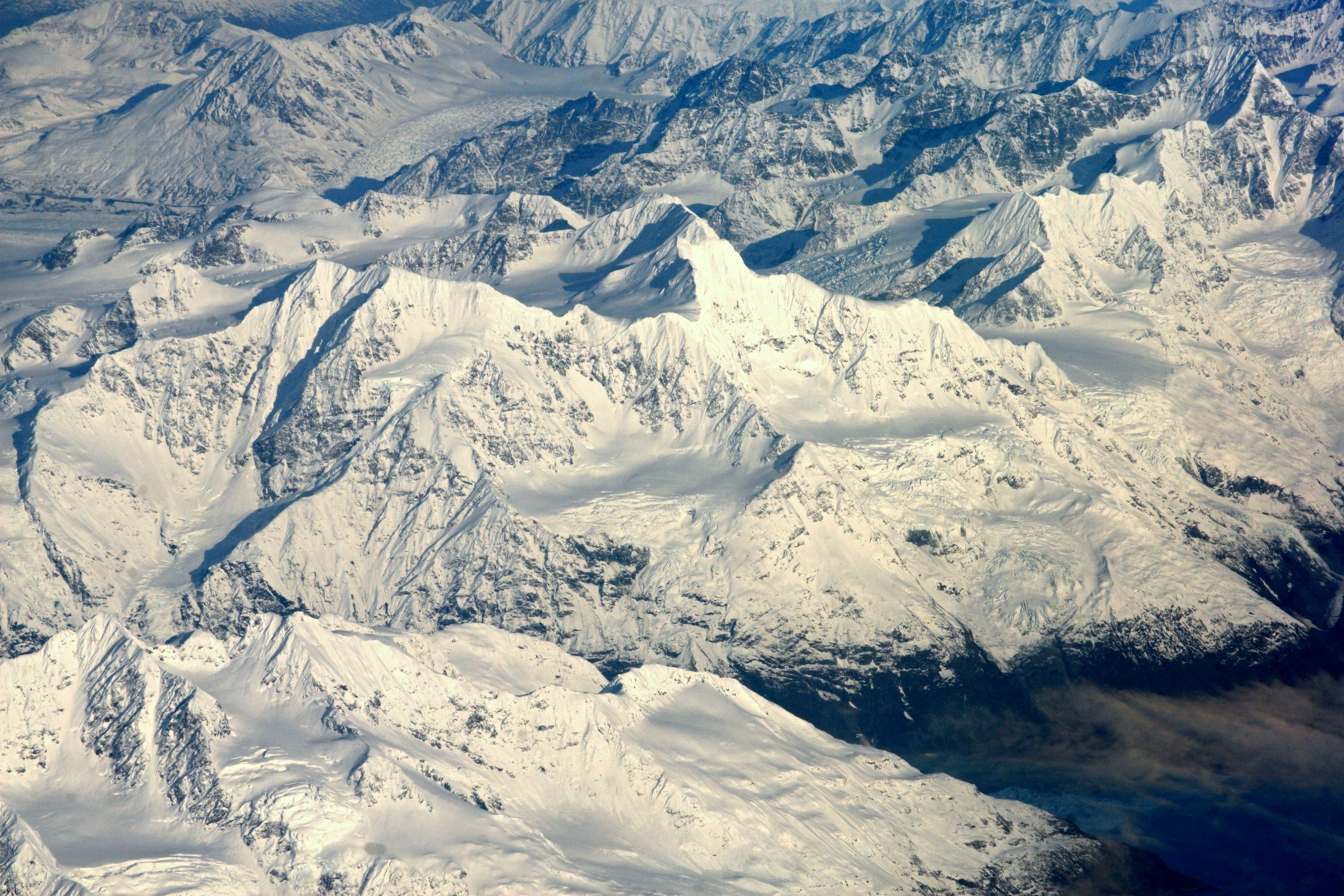
Mount Muir from airliner

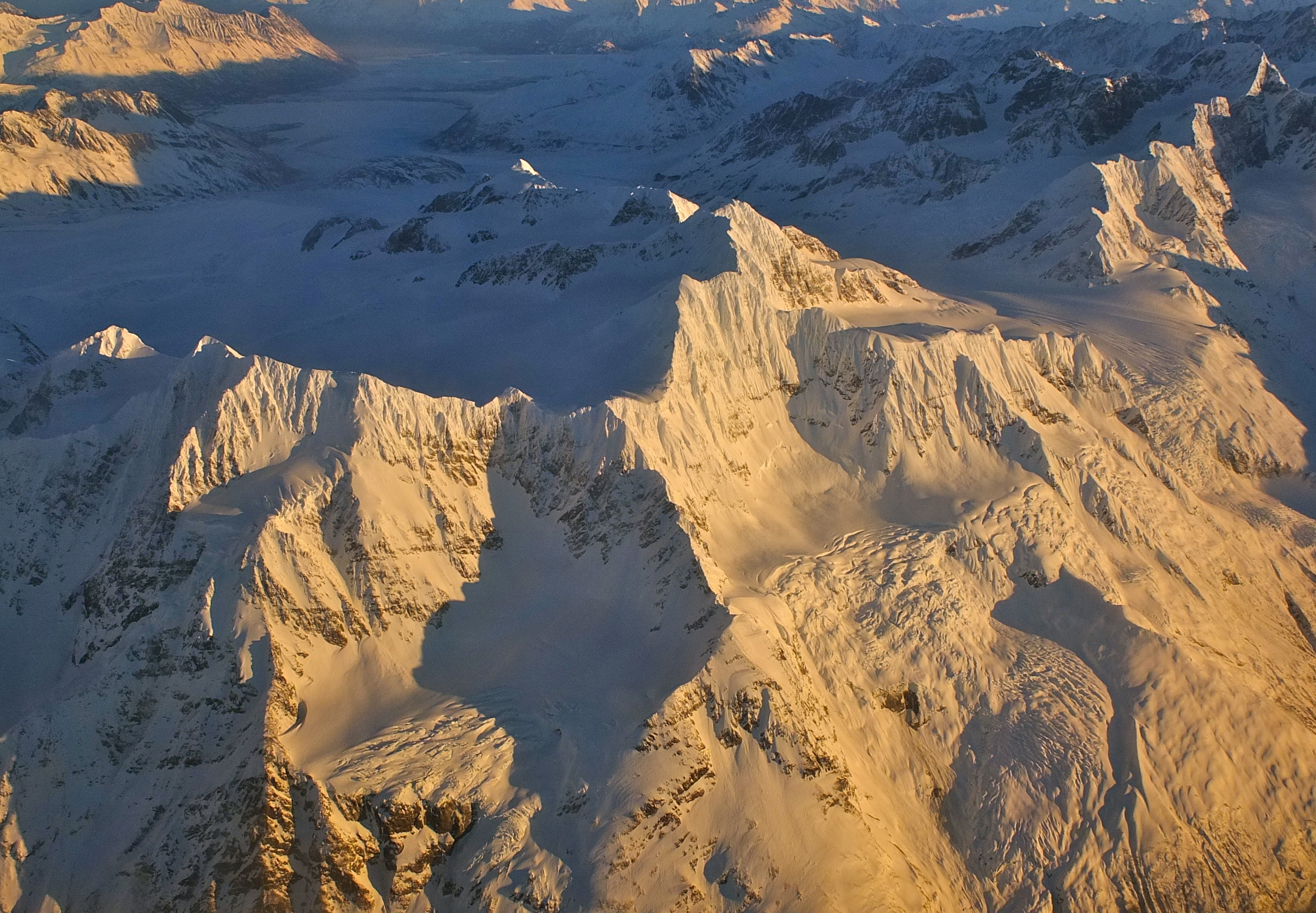
Looking north at Muir

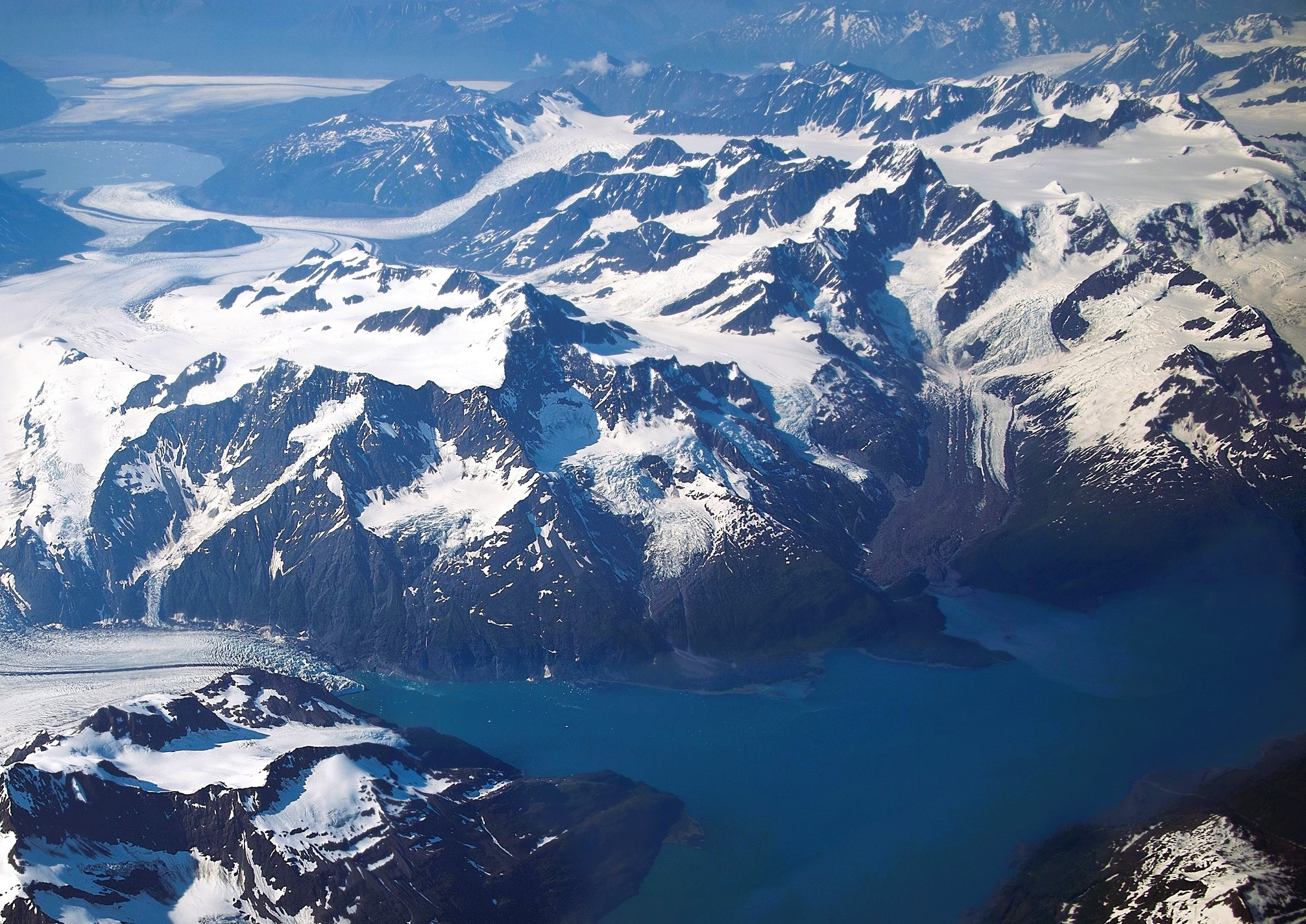
Mt. Muir (left) and Mt. Gilbert (right) seen from a jetliner

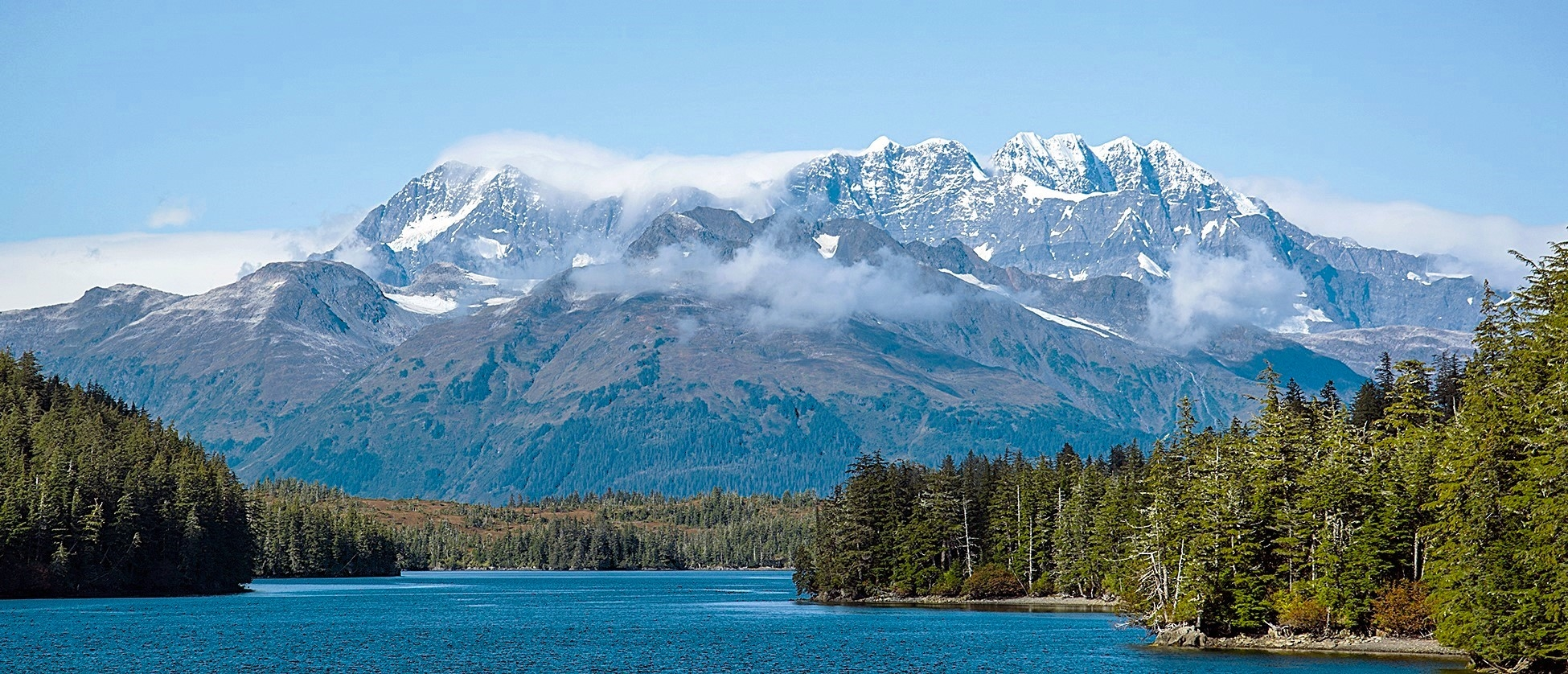
Southeast aspect of Mount Muir behind Mount Doran

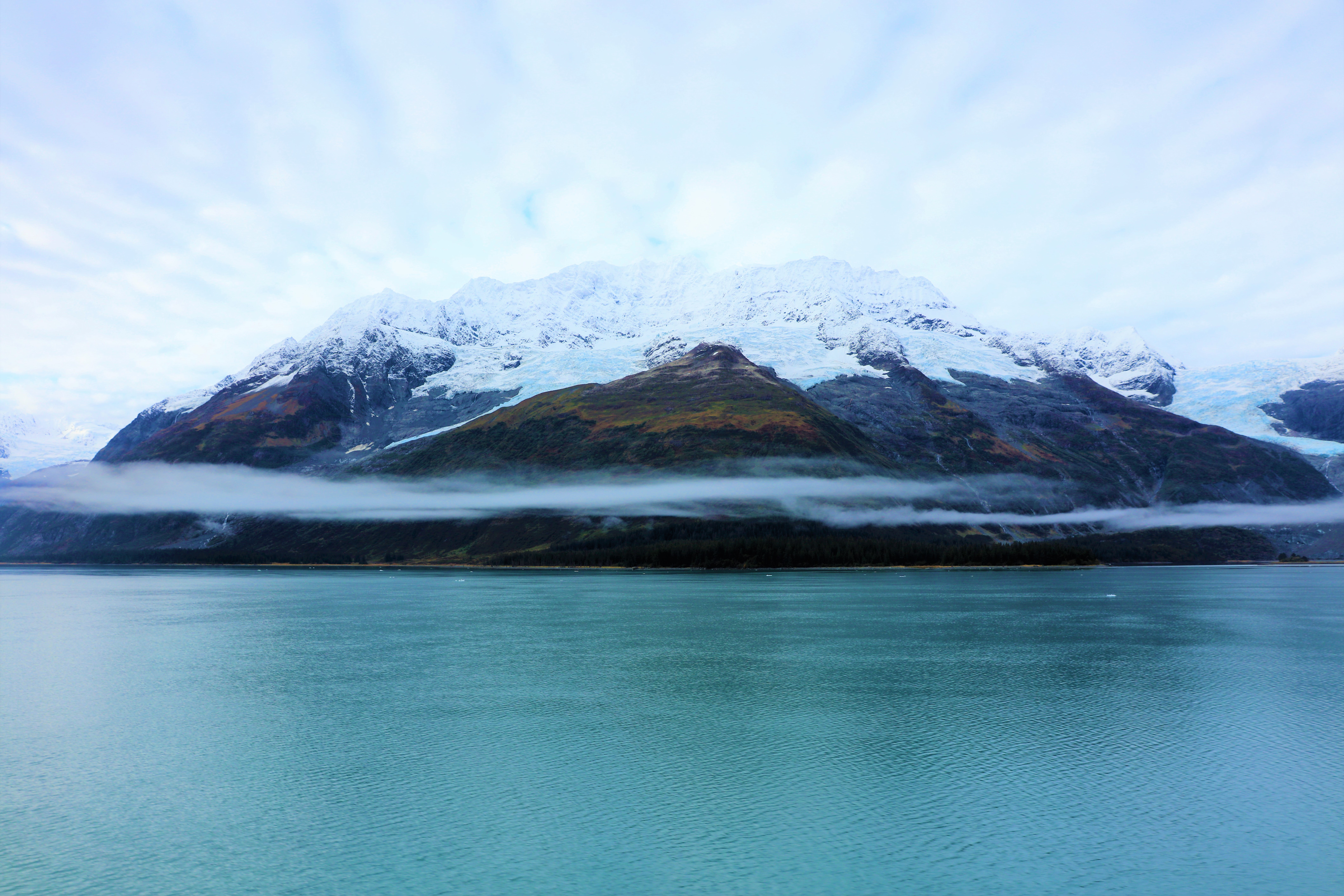
Mount Muir as seen from Harriman Fjord

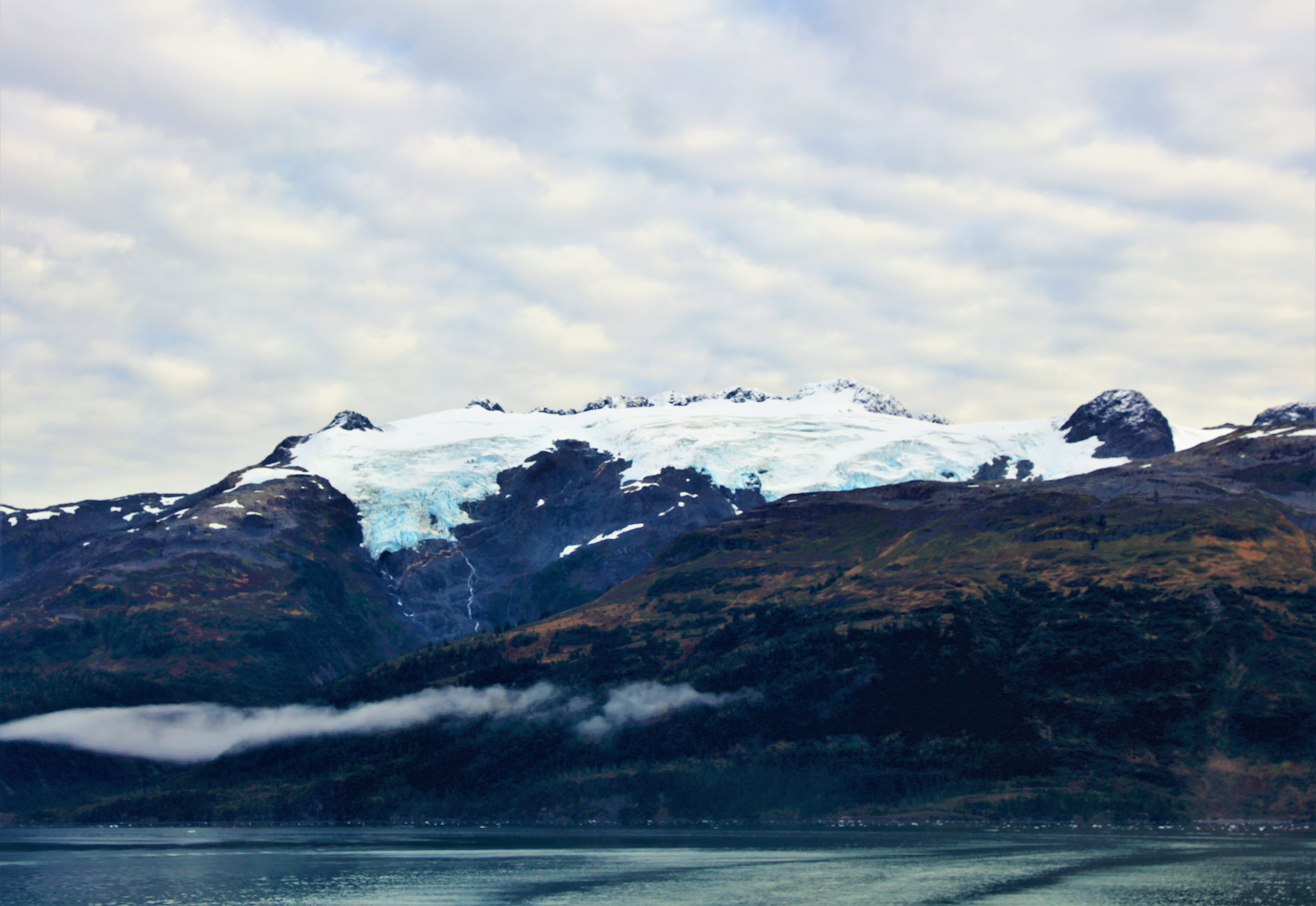
The Baker Glacier (left) and Penniman Glaciers (right)

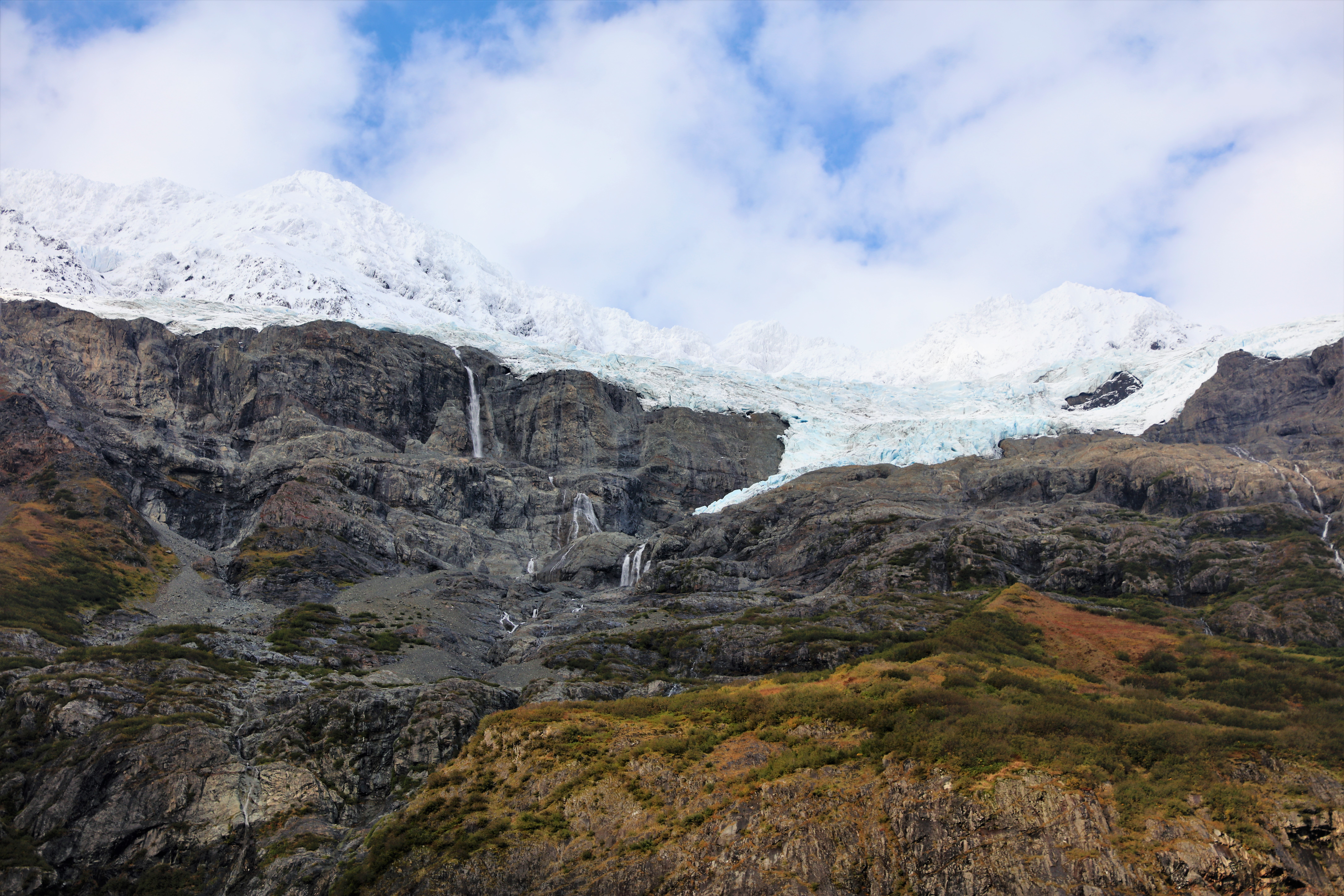
Mount Muir viewed from Harriman Fjord

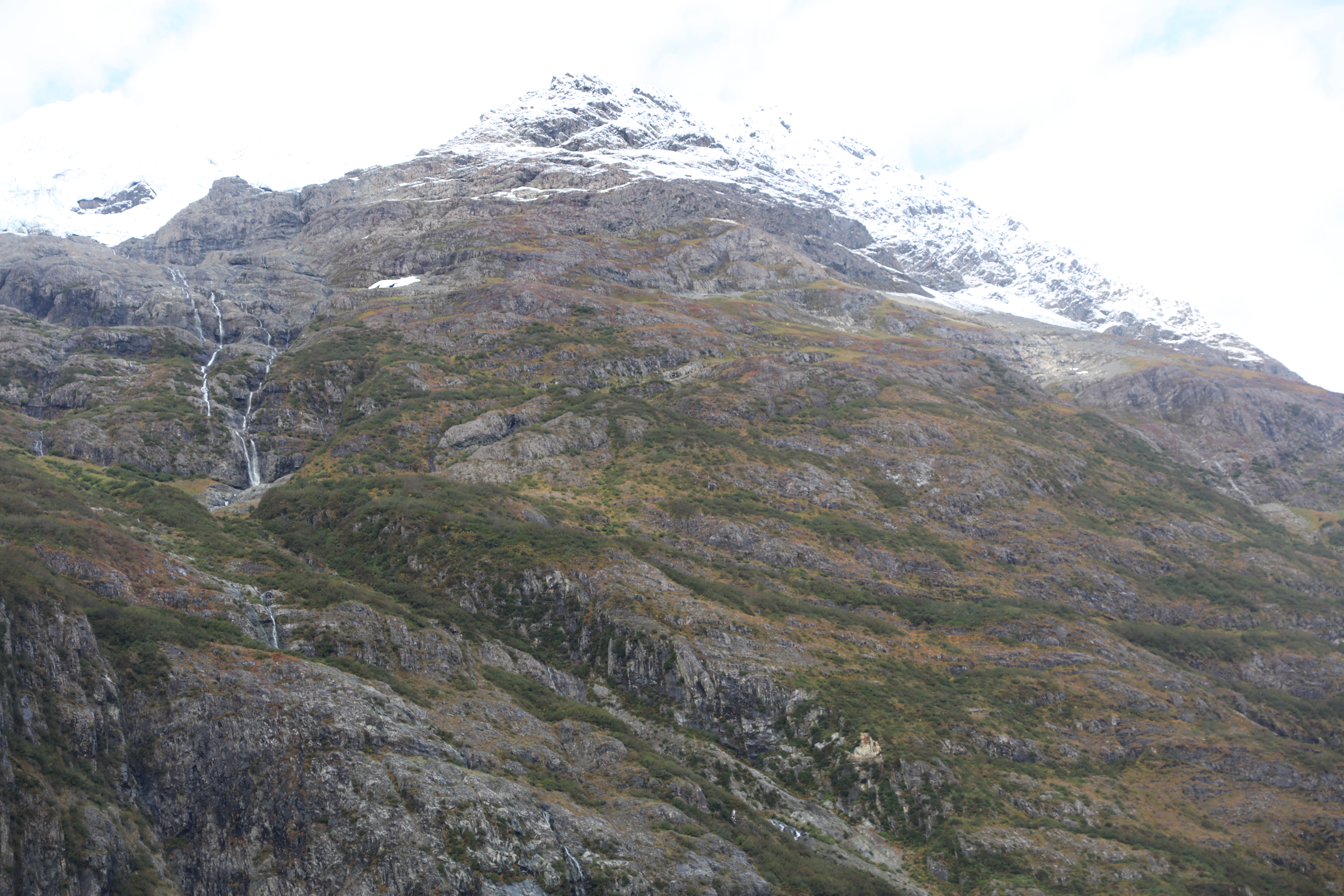

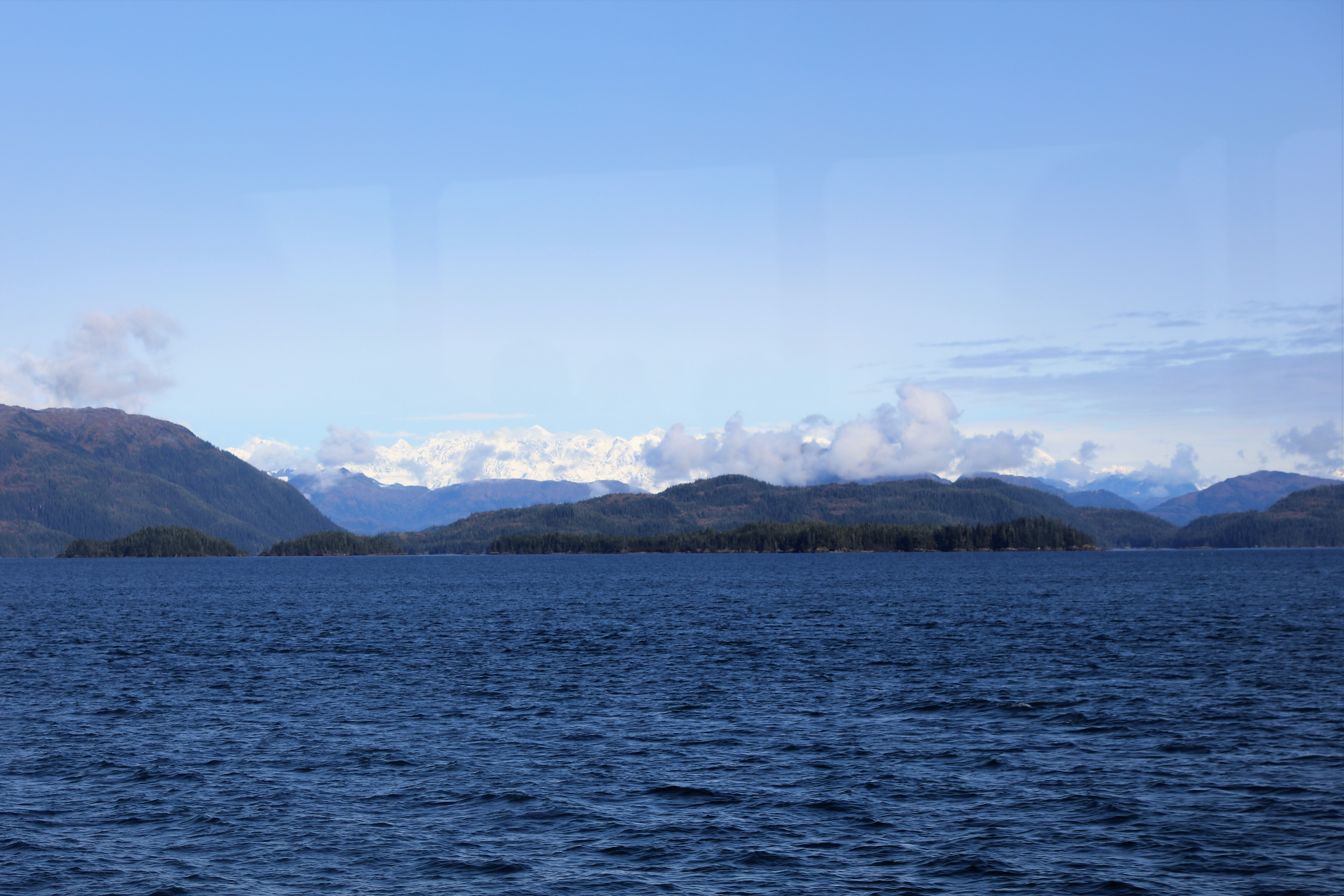
The Muir, Gilbert, and Gannett mountain group from Esther Passage

== See also ==
- Geography of Alaska

== Sources ==
- Dufresne, Jim (October 2009). Alaska [Alaska] (in Italian). Turin: EDT srl. ISBN 978-88-6040-464-0.
- Molnia, Bruce F. (2008). Richard S. Williams Jr. & Jane G. Ferrigno (ed.). Glaciers of Alaska - USGS [Glaciers of Alaska - USGS].
