= Henry Gannett =

American geographer (1846–1914)

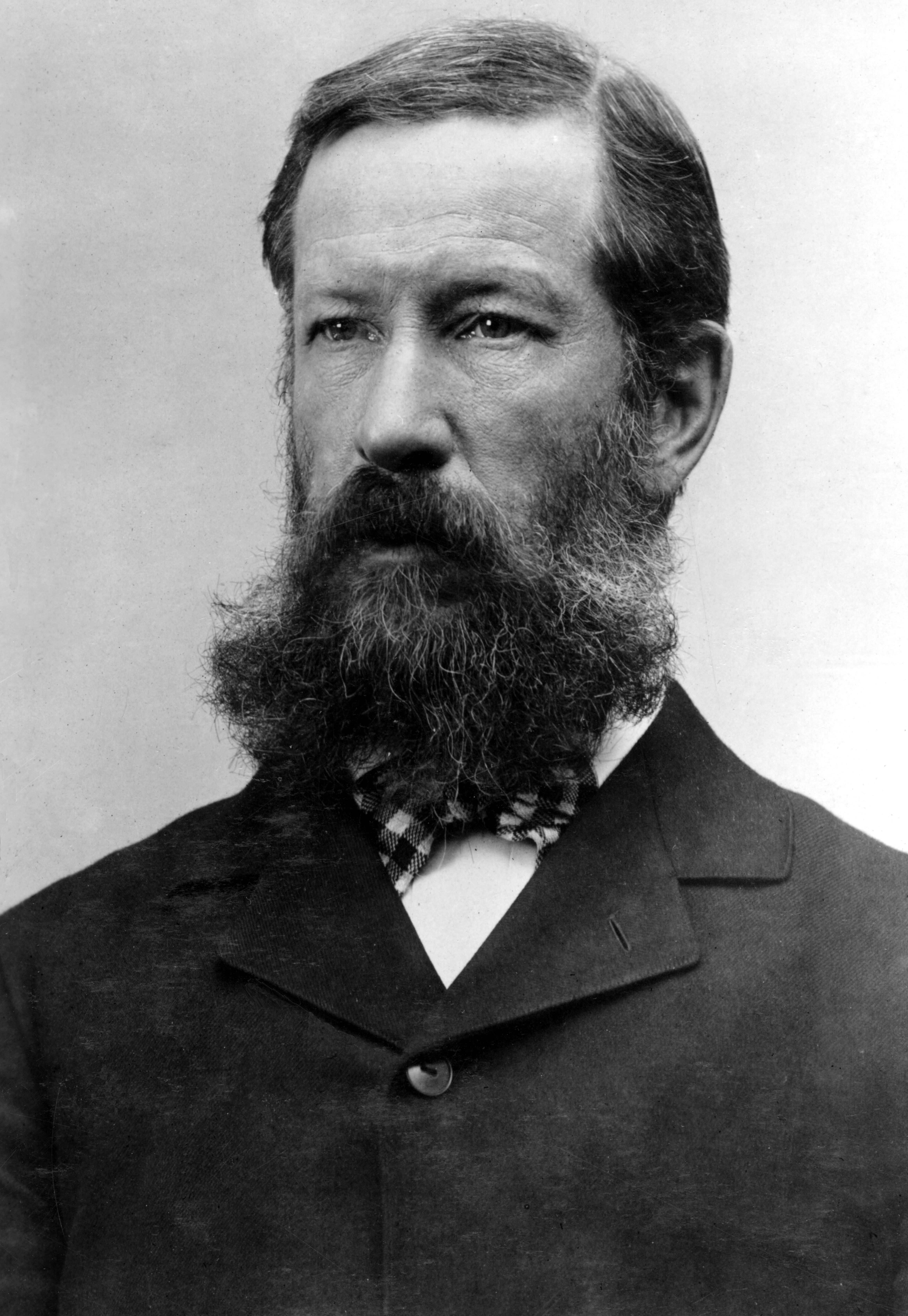
- Born: August 24, 1846; Bath, Maine, U.S.
- Died: November 5, 1914 (aged 68); Washington, D.C., U.S.
- Education: Harvard University; Harvard University School of Mining and Practical Geology
- Occupation: Geographer
- Employer(s): United States Geological Survey; United States Census
- Organization(s): American Association of Geographers; Cosmos Club; National Geographic Society
- Known for: Father of mapmaking in America

Henry Gannett (August 24, 1846 – November 5, 1914) was an American geographer who is described as the "father of mapmaking in America." He was the chief geographer for the United States Geological Survey essentially from its founding until 1902.

He was a founding member and president of the National Geographic Society, a founder of the American Association of Geographers, and a co-founder and president of the Twenty Year Club or Twenty Year Topographers which was formed at the U.S.G.S. Topographic Division. He was also a founder and president of the Cosmos Club in Washington, D.C.

Gannett also was the geographer of the 10th United States Census in 1880, 11th Census in 1890, and the 12th Census in 1900. He was the assistant director of the 1899 Census of the Philippines and Puerto Rico, the 1902 Census of the Philippines, and the 1906 Census in Cuba.

== Early life ==
Gannett was born in Bath, Maine, on August 24, 1846. He was the son of Hannah Trufant (née Church) and Michael Farley Gannett. He attended local schools, before going to Harvard for college. He graduated with a B.S. from the Lawrence Scientific School of Harvard University in 1869 and received an M.E. at the Hooper Mining School (aka the Harvard University School of Mining and Practical Geology) in 1870. Later, he trained in topographic mapping at Cambridge under Josiah D. Whitney and Charles F. Hoffman.

== Career ==
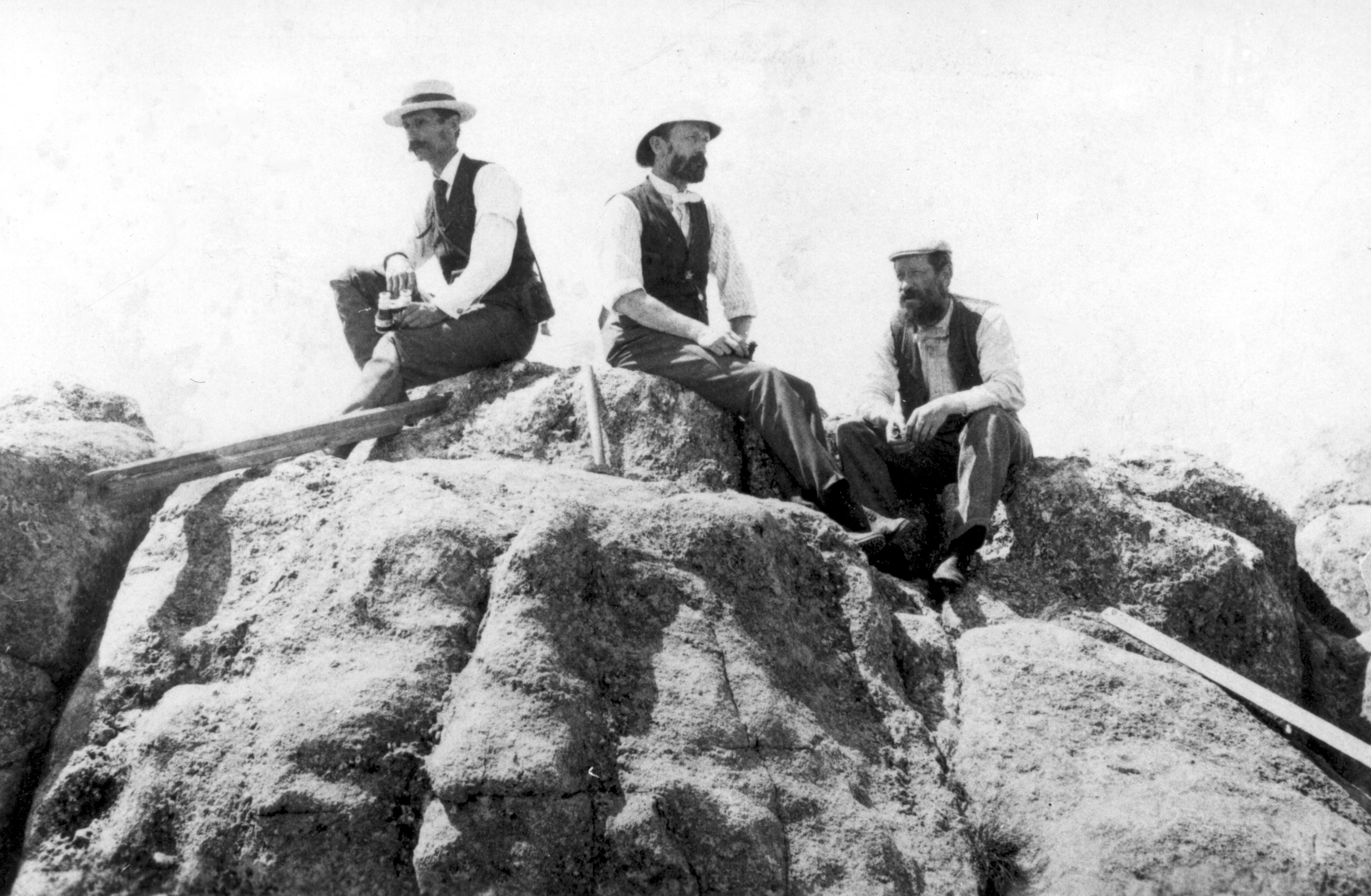
U.S. Geological Survey cartographers with Gannett, c.1890-1900

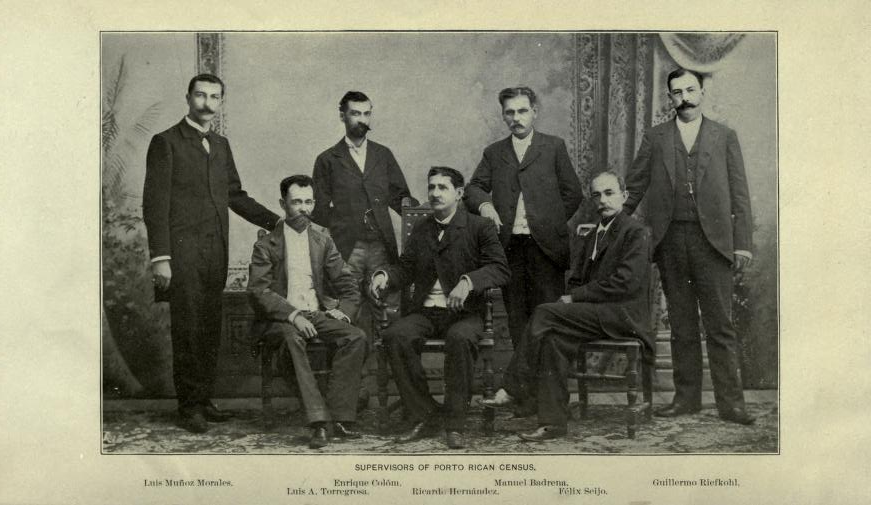
Supervisors for the Puerto Rican Census, 1899

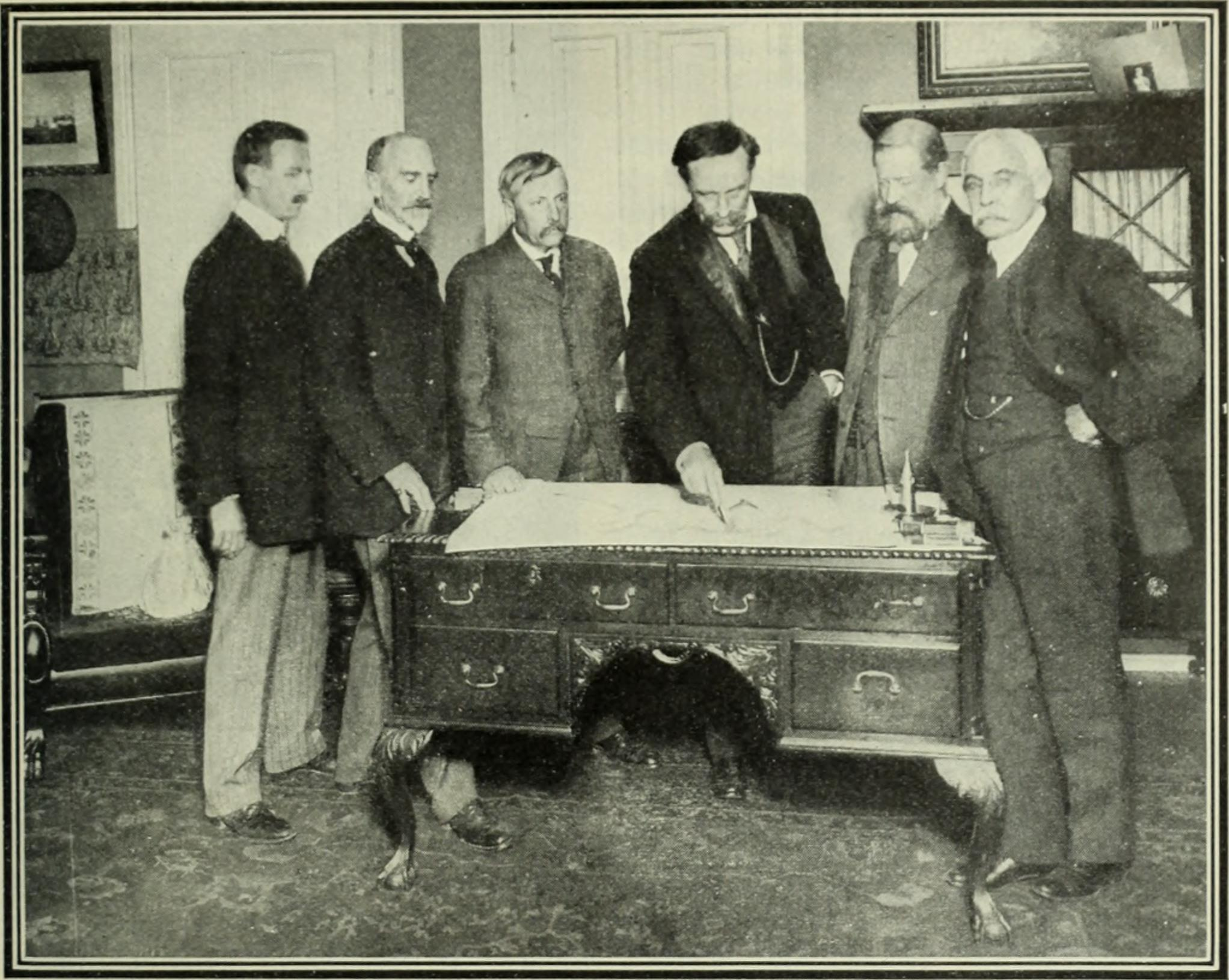
Review of Peary's Records: Gilbert Grosvenor, Otto H. Tittman, Willis L. Moore, Commander Peary, Gannett, C. M. Chester

From 1870 to 1871, Gannett was an assistant at the Harvard College Observatory. In 1871, he participated in a Harvard expedition to Spain to observe a solar eclipse.

In 1871 he declined a position as an astronomer with Charles Francis Hall's ill-fated Polaris Expedition to the North Pole. Instead, with the encouragement of Charles Hoffman, he accepted the position of topographer with Dr. Ferdinand Vandeveer Hayden's survey of Yellowstone National Park, working on western territories surveys from 1872 through 1879. On July 26, 1872, while climbing the then-unnamed highest mountain in the Gallatin Mountains, he and his party experienced electric shocks following a lightning event near the summit. He named the mountain Electric Peak.

In 1879, Gannet was among those lobbying to centralize the mapping functions into one government agency. Previously individual mapmakers and agencies had to compete for money from Congress for project funds. He suggested calling the new organization "United States Geological and Geographical Survey" although the name United States Geological Survey (USGS) would officially be approved. He also assisted in planning the work of the USGS.

Gannet was appointed to the USGS on October 8, 1879, under director Clarence King. He was immediately transferred served as the geographer of the 10th United States Census in 1880. He laid out 2,000 enumeration districts with such precision that for the first time, each census enumerator knew in advance the metes and bounds of his particular district. The completion of this work on July 1, 1882, is considered the start of true topographical work in the United States and the birth of the quad.

On July 1, 1882, John Wesley Powell appointed Gannett as the chief geographer in charge of the topographic mapping division of the USGS, a position he held until 1896. Around 1884, he persuaded various organizations doing the surveys, including the railroads, to begin using similar datums so the data could interconnect. As the chief geographer, he oversaw work on the topographical atlas of the United States. He also served as a geographer for the 11th Census in 1890 and the 12th Census in 1900.

In 1890, he and Thomas Corwin Mendenhall of the United States Coast and Geodetic Survey campaigned to establish the United States Board on Geographic Names to create official names for locations in the United States. He was named to the newly created Board on Geographic Names by President Benjamin Harrison in Executive Order No. 28. In 1896, his last year with the USGS, he started the use of the benchmark.

In 1899, he was invited on the Harriman Alaska Expedition. In 1899, he was appointed the assistant director of the Census of the Philippines and Puerto Rico, the Philippines again in 1902, and Cuba in 1906. In 1909 he was named chairman of a special committee to examine and verify the records of Robert E. Peary in the controversy with Frederick Cook over who was the first to reach the North Pole.

Gannett's published works are geographical and statistical. He wrote more than fifty USGS Bulletins and Annual Reports. He issued a gazetteer for eleven states and was a contributor to Baedecker's Guide to the United States, Encyclopedia Britannica, and The New International Encyclopedia. He also was the author books for general readers and. statistical atlases. He wrote articles for The National Geographic Magazine, Science, Nature, Bulletin of the American Geographical Society, and other journals. Although he did not write many works in geomorphology and physical geology, he offered valuable suggestions. For example, he recognized hanging valleys and their importance in interpreting a geological setting. Later his in career, he ofter wrote about American forests, and the importance of conservation.

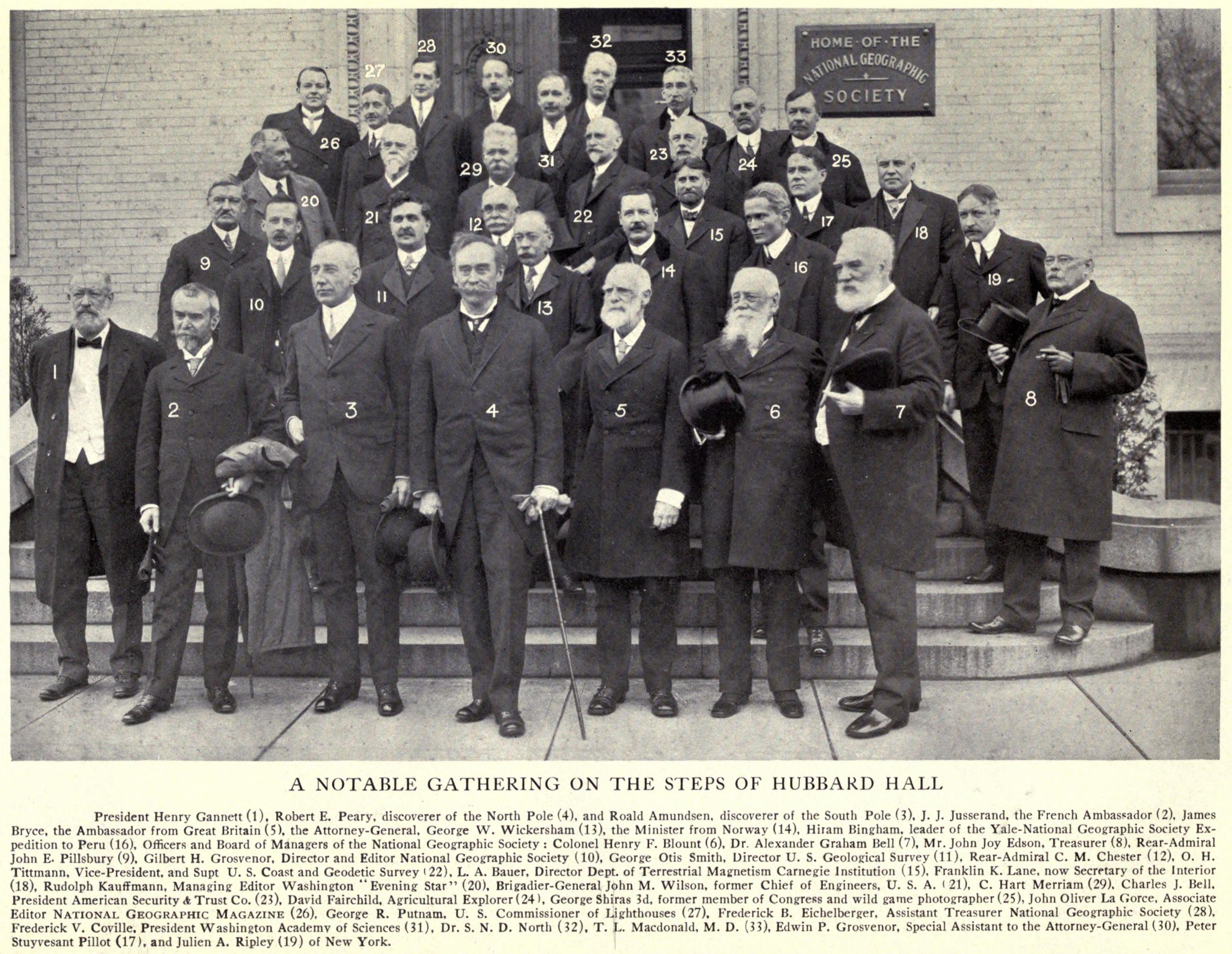
National Geographic Society members, 1909

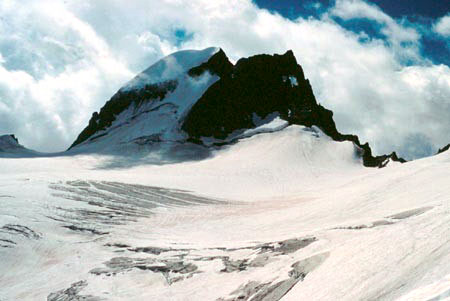
Gannet Peak and Gannett Glacier in Pinedale, Wyoming

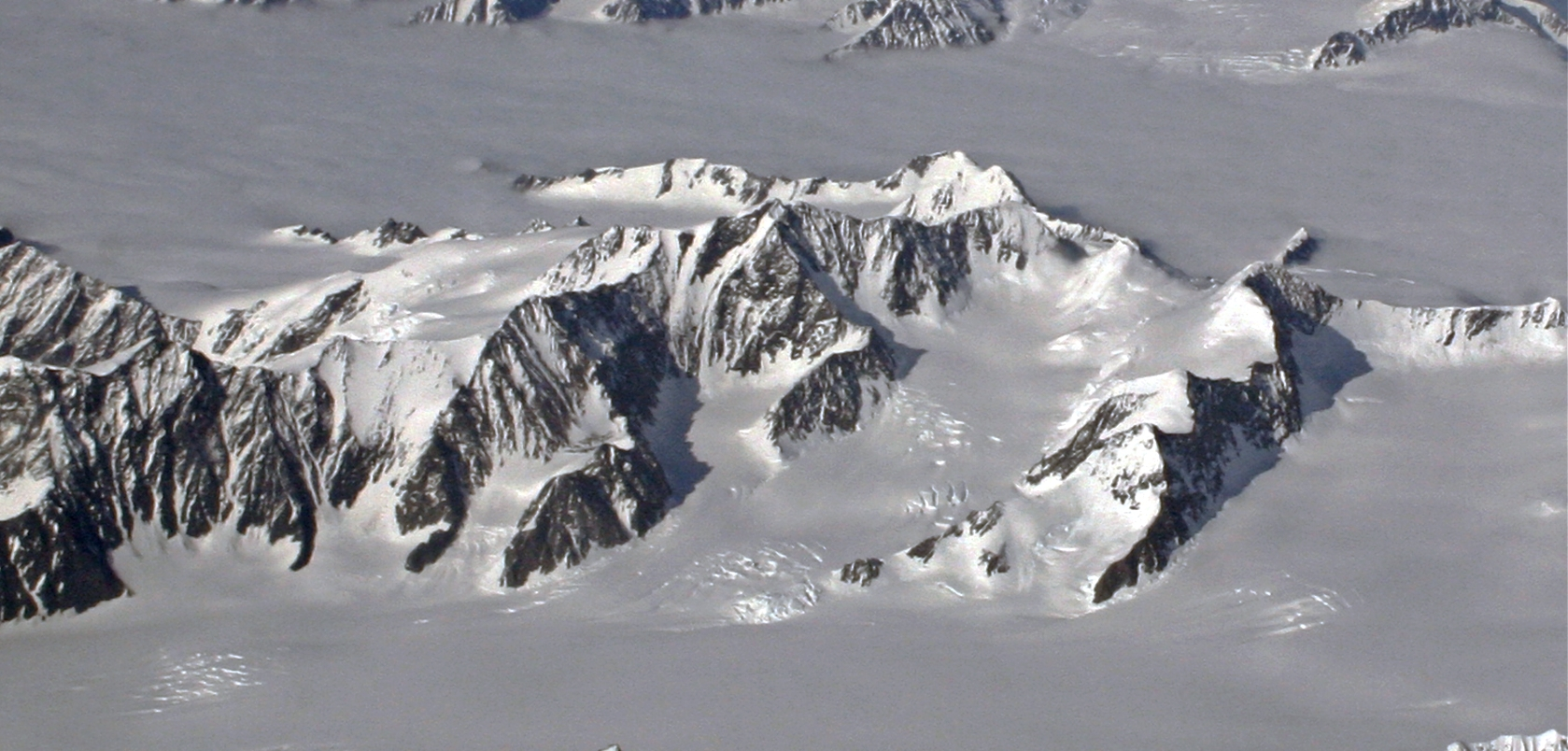
Mount Gannett in the Chugach Mountains, Alaska

== Professional affiliations ==
In 1888 Gannett was one of six founding members of the National Geographic Society. He served as its first secretary, and later as treasurer, then vice–president, and president, in 1909. He was also Chair of the Society's Research Committee, organizing expeditions to Alaska, La Soufriere, Mount Pelee, Peru, and the Polar Seas.

From 1897 to 1909, he was a vice president of the American Statistical Association. In 1904 he was among the founders of the American Association of Geographers. Also in 1904, he was secretary of the 8th Geographic Congress. He was also a member of the Washington Academy of Sciences, the Royal Geographical Society of London, the Royal Scottish Geographical Society, and the Philadelphia Geographic Society.

Gannett was a co-founder and president of the Twenty Year Club or Twenty Year Topographers which was formed at the United States Geological Survey Topographic Division in the winter of 1910–1911. Eligibility was serving twenty years or more as a topographer with the U.S.G.S.

== Honors ==
Gannett received an honorary LL.D from Bowdoin College in 1889.

Gannett Peak, the highest peak in Wyoming, and the related Gannett Glacier was named for him in 1906. In 1911, Lawrence Martin named Mount Gannett, a 10,000-foot (3,000 m) peak in the Chugach Mountains of eastern Alaska, for Henry Gannett.

The USGS National Geospatial Program presents the Henry Gannett Award for outstanding efforts in advancing and promoting mapping and geospatial sciences in the United States.

== Personal ==
Gannett married Mary E. Chase of Waterville, Maine on November 24, 1874. They had a son, Farley Gannett who was an engineer for the Water Supply Commission of Pennsylvania. Their daughters were May Gannett (Mrs. G. T. Backus) and Alice Gannett; the latter was a noted social reformer and settlement house worker.

Gannett was one of the ten founding members and president of the Cosmos Club.

Gannett died at his home in 1840 Biltmore Street, Washington, D.C. on November 5, 1914, after being ill for about a year with Bright's Disease. His funeral service was given by Rev. U. G. B. Pierce of All Soul's Unitarian Church. The day of his funeral, the National Geographic Society closed its offices and draped the building in mourning.

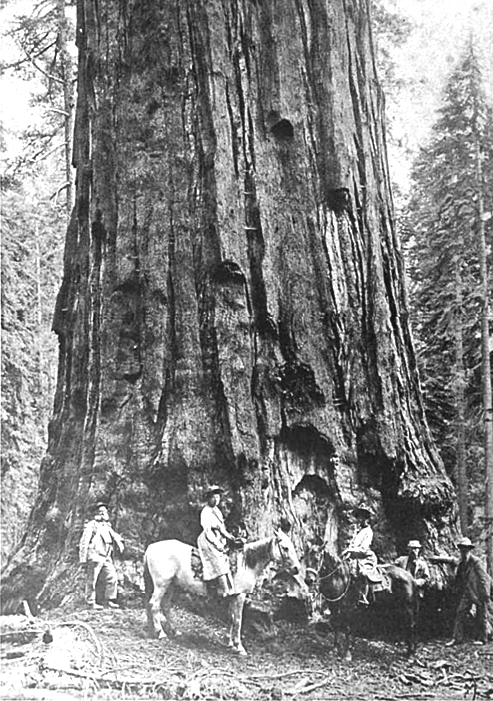
Sierra Club trek with John Muir, Gannett and others at the General Sherman Tree, 1902

== Selected publications ==
=== Books ===
- The West: From the Census of 1880, a History of the Industrial, Commercial, Social, and Political Development of the States and Territories of the West from 1800 to 1880. with Robert P. Porter and William A. Jones. Chicago: Rand, McNally & Company, 1882.
- Louisiana. Boston: Little, Brown & Co., 1882.
- Scribner's Statistical Atlas with F. W. Hewes. New York: C. Scribner's Sons, 1883.
- The Building of a Nation, the growth, Present Condition and Resources of the United States, with a Forecast of the Future. New York: The H. T. Thomas Company, 1893.
- Topographical Atlas of the State of Rhode Island and Providence Plantations. with Marcus Baker and George H. Walker. Providence, R.I.: J.C. Thompson, 1891
- The Building of a Nation; the Growth, Present Condition and Resources of the United States with a Forecast of the Future;. New York: The Henry T. Thomas Company, 1895.
- Stanford's Compendium of Geography and Travel: The United States vol. 2. London: Edward Stanford, 1898.
- Commercial Geography. with Carl L. Garrison and Edwin J. Houston. New York: American Book Company, 1905.
- Statistical Abstract of the World. New York: John Wiley & Sons, 1907.
- Cuba: Population, History and Resources 1907. with Victor H. Olmsted. Washington, D.C.: United States Bureau of the Census, 1909.

=== Monographs ===
- The Areas of the United States, the Several States and Territories, and their Counties. Extra Census Bulletin, 1881.
- Dictionary of Altitudes in the United States. United States Geological Survey Bulletin no. 5, 1884.
- Dictionary of Altitudes in the United States. 2nd edition. United States Geological Survey Bulletin no. 70, 1884.
- Boundaries of the United States and of the Several States and Territories, with a Historical Sketch of the Territorial Changes. United States Geological Survey Bulletin no. 13, 1885.
- A Manual of Topographic Methods. United States Geological Survey Monograph no. 22, 1893.
- Statistics of the Negroes in the United States. The Trustees of the John F. Slater Fund Occasional Papers no. 4, 1894.
- Occupations of the Negroes. The Trustees of the John F. Slater Fund Occasional Papers no. 6, 1894.
- A Dictionary of Altitudes in the United States,3rd edition, United States Geological Survey Bulletin 160, 1899.
- Origin of Certain Place Names in the United States. United States Geological Survey Bulletin 248, 1902.
- A Gazetteer of Porto Rico. United States Geological Survey Bulletin no. 183, 1901.
- A Gazetteer of Cuba. United States Geological Survey Bulletin no. 192, 1902.
- A Gazetteer of Texas. United States Geological Survey Bulletin no. 224, 1902.
- "The Forests of Oregon" United States Geological Survey Professional Paper no. 4, 1902.
- "The Forests of Washington" United States Geological Survey Professional Paper no. 5, 1902.
- A Gazetter of Delaware. United States Geological Survey Bulletin no. 230, Series F, Geography 38, 1904.
- A Gazetter of Maryland. United States Geological Survey Bulletin no. 231, 1904.
- A Gazetter of Virginia. United States Geological Survey Bulletin no. 232, Series F, Geography 40, 1904.
- A Gazetteer of Indian Territory. United States Geological Survey Bulletin248, Series F, Geography 44, 1905.
- A Dictionary of Altitudes in the United States 4th edition.United States Geological Survey Bulletin no. 274, 1906.
- A Gazetteer of Colorado. United States Geological Survey Bulletin no. 291, Series F, Geography 51, 1906.
- The Areas of the United States, the States, and the Territories. United States Geological Survey Bulletin no. 302, Series F, Geography 58, 1906.

=== Articles ===
- "Report on the Geographical Field Work in the Yellowstone National Park", Twelfth Annual Report of the Survey for the Year 1878. United States Geological Survey, June 13, 1883.
- "The Geodetic Work of the Hayden and Wheeler Surveys", Science, vol. 3, no. 2, April 11, 1884.
- "Is the Rainfall Increasing upon the Plains?", Science vol. 11, no. 265, March 2, 1888.
- "The Mother Maps of the United States", The National Geographic Magazine vol. 4, 1892–1893.
- "The Average Elevation of the United States". Thirteenth Annual Report of the Director 1891–92, United States Geological Survey, 1894.
- "The Movements of Our Population",The National Geographic Magazine vol. 5, 1895.
- "The Mapping of New York State", Journal of the American Geographical Society of New York vol. 27, 1895.
- "Summary of the Primary Triangulation Executed by the United States Geological Survey between the Years 1882 and 1894", Sixteenth Annual Report of the Survey 1894–95 Part 1: Director's Report and Papers of a Theoretical Nature. United States Geological Survey, 1896.
- "A Graphic History of the United States", Journal of the American Geographical Society of New York, vol. 28, 1896.
- "The Topographic Work of the U. S. Geological Survey in 1895", Journal of the American Geographical Society of New York, vol. 28, no. 4, January 1896.
- "Survey and Subdivision of Indian Territory", The National Geographic Magazinevol. 7, no. 3, March 1896.
- "The Work of the United States Board on Geographic Names", The National Geographic Magazine vol. 7, no. 7, July 1896.
- "Statistics of Railways in the United States", The National Geographic Magazine vol. 7, no.12, December 1896.
- "The Administration of the Forests of the Public Domain", Journal of the American Geographical Society of New York, vol. 29, 1897.
- "Our Foreign Trade", The National Geographic Magazine vol. 9, no. 5, January 1898.
- "Captain Charles D. Sigsbee, U. S. N.", The National Geographic Magazine vol. 9, no. 5, May 1898.
- "Geographic Work of the General Government", The National Geographic Magazine vol. 9, no. 7. July 1898.
- "The Forest Conditions and Standing Timber of the State of Washington", The National Geographic Magazine vol. 9, no. 9. September 1898.
- "The Timber Line", Journal of the American Geographical Society of New York, vol. 31, January 1899.
- "The Redwood Forest of the Pacific Coast", The National Geographic Magazine vol. 10, no. 5. May 1899.
- "The Harriman Alaska Expedition", The National Geographic Magazine vol. 10, no. 12, December 1899.
- "The Forests of the United States", Twentieth Annual Report of the Survey 1898–99, Part 5, Forest Reserves. United States Geological Survey, 1900.
- "Early Western Explorers and the Railroads", Bulletin of the American Geographical Society vol. 37, January 1905.
- "A Revelation of the Filipinos" with Joseph Prentiss Sanger and Victor H. Olmsted. The National Geographic Magazine vol. 16, no. 4, April 1905.
- "Certain Relations of Rainfall and Temperature to Tree Growth", Bulletin of the American Geographical Society vol. 38, January 1906.
- "Farm Tenure in the United States", Annals of the American Academy of Political and Social Science, vol. 33, May 1, 1909.
- "Commander Peary's Expedition to the North Pole" with C. M. Chester and O. H. Tittman. Nature vol. 83, no. 2114, May 1910.
