= Mount Doran =

Mountain in Alaska, United States

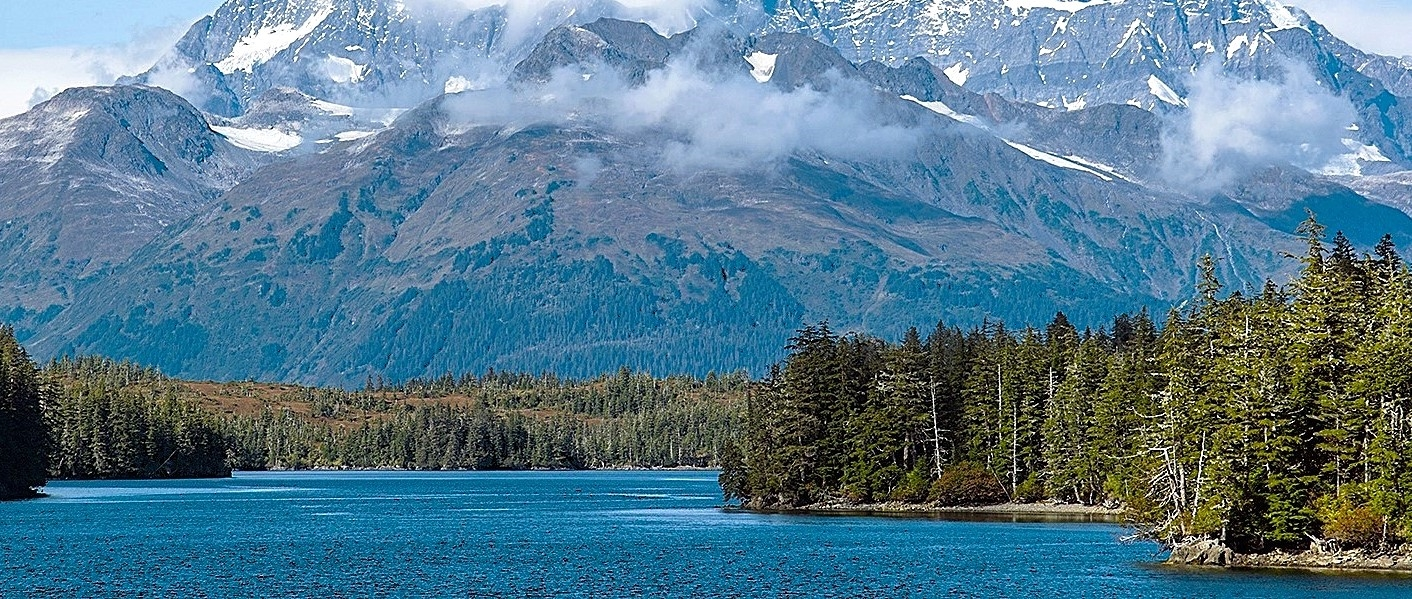
- Southeast aspect

Highest point
- Elevation: 3,650 ft (1,113 m)
- Prominence: 1,900 ft (579 m)
- Parent peak: Peak 3812
- Isolation: 6.22 mi (10.01 km)
- Coordinates: 61°01′09″N 148°14′31″W

Naming
- Etymology: Peter A. Doran

Geography
- Location within Alaska
- Interactive map of Mount Doran
- Country: United States
- State: Alaska
- Census Area: Chugach
- Protected area: Chugach National Forest
- Parent range: Chugach Mountains
- Topo map: USGS Anchorage A-4

Mount Doran is a 3,650-foot (1,113-metre) mountain summit in Alaska, United States.

== Description ==
Mount Doran is situated eight miles (13 km) southeast of Mount Muir and 25 miles (40 km) northeast of Whittier in the Chugach Mountains and Chugach National Forest. Topographic relief is significant as the summit rises 2,650 ft (810 m) above Lagoon Creek in 1 mile (1.6 km), and 3,650 ft (1,110 m) above tidewater in 2 miles (3.2 km). The mountain's toponym was applied in 1911 by U.S. Grant of the USGS to remember Peter A. Doran, captain of the steamer SS George W. Elder which was the ship used by the Harriman Alaska expedition that explored this area in 1899. The toponym was officially adopted in 1911 by the U.S. Board on Geographic Names. Peter Doran perished during the sinking of the SS Columbia on 21 July 1907. He is also the namesake of Point Doran and Doran Strait which are northeast of this mountain.

== Climate ==
Based on the Köppen climate classification, Mount Doran is located in a subpolar oceanic climate zone with cold, snowy winters, and cool summers. Weather systems coming off the Gulf of Alaska are forced upwards by the mountains (orographic lift), causing heavy precipitation in the form of rainfall and snowfall. Winter temperatures can drop below 0 °F with wind chill factors below −10 °F. This climate supports the Toboggan Glacier on the west slope of this peak. The months May through July offer the most favorable weather for viewing or climbing Mount Doran.

== Gallery ==
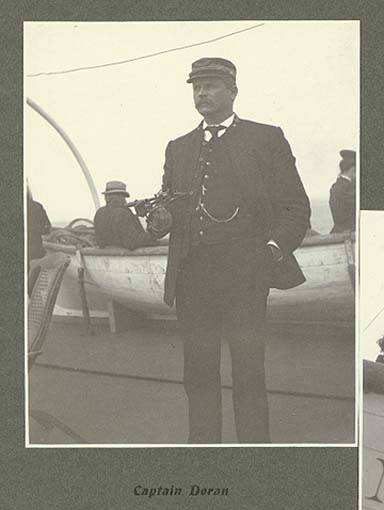
Peter Doran, June 1899 during the Harriman Alaska expedition

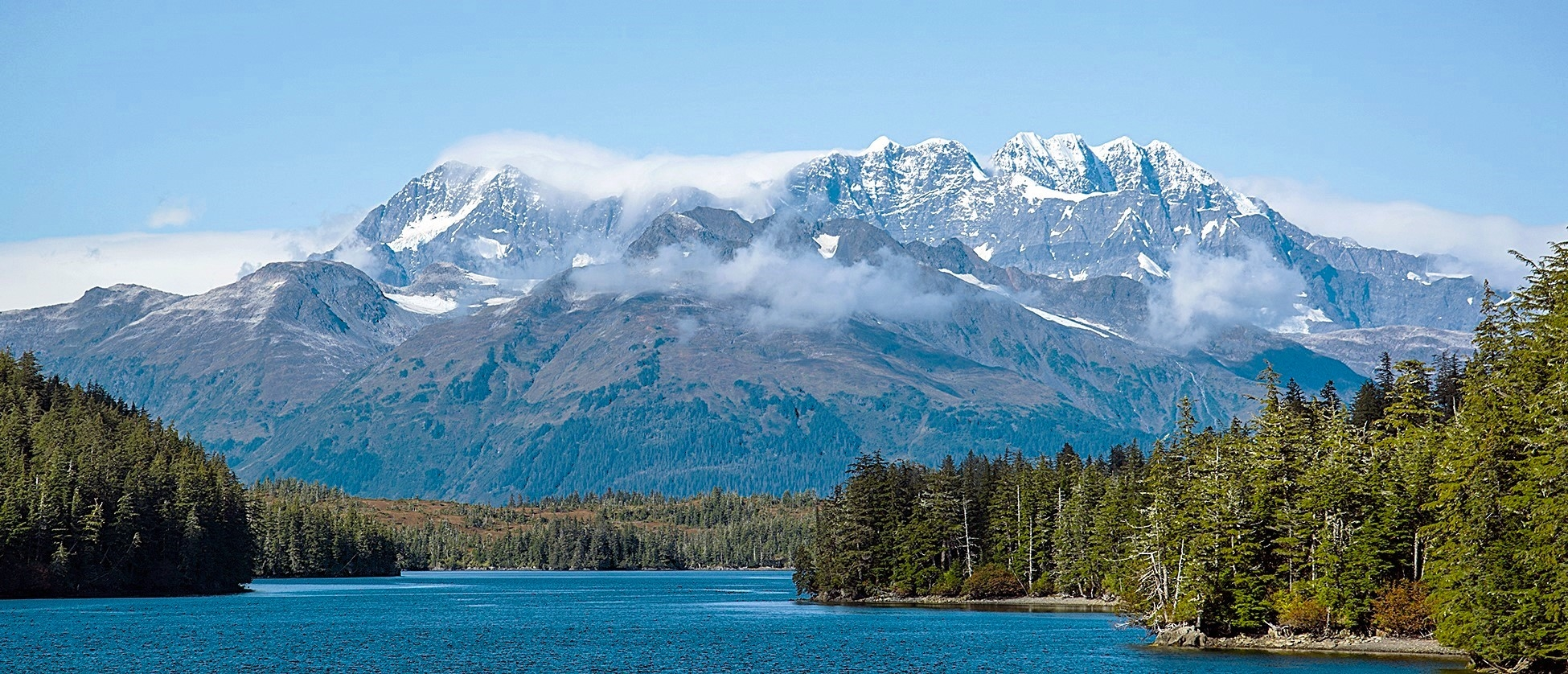
Southeast aspect of Mount Doran in front of Mount Muir

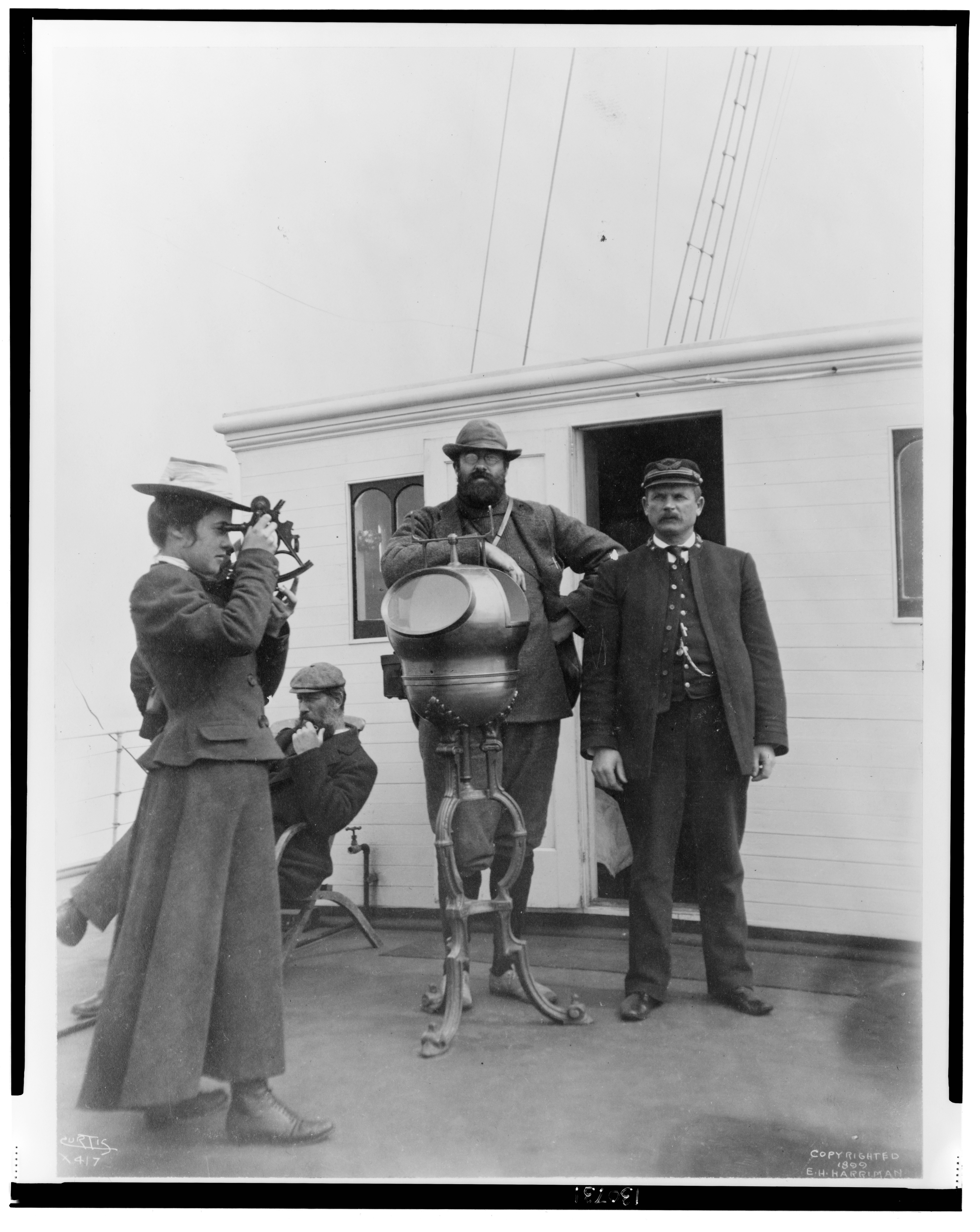
Peter Doran to the right

== See also ==
- List of mountain peaks of Alaska
- Geography of Alaska
