= Samuel Hooper =

American politician

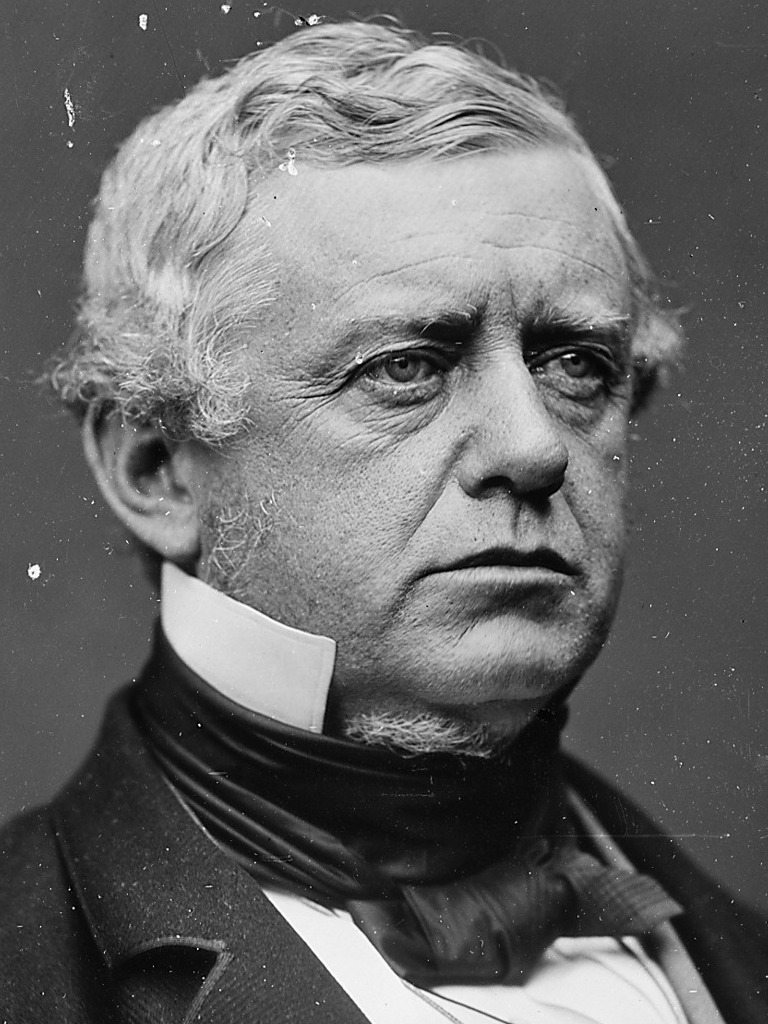

Member of the U.S. House of Representatives from Massachusetts
- In office December 2, 1861 – February 14, 1875
- Preceded by: William Appleton
- Succeeded by: Rufus S. Frost
- Constituency: 5th district (1861–63); 4th district (1863–75)

Member of the Massachusetts Senate
- In office 1858

Member of the Massachusetts House of Representatives
- In office 1851–1853

Personal details
- Born: February 3, 1808 Marblehead, Massachusetts, U.S.
- Died: February 14, 1875 (aged 67) Washington, D.C., U.S.
- Party: Republican

Samuel Hooper (February 3, 1808 – February 14, 1875) was a businessman and member of Congress from Massachusetts.

== Early life ==
Hooper was born in Marblehead, Massachusetts. His father, Robert Hooper, was a shipping merchant and later served as president of the Grand Bank of Marblehead. After a common school education, Hooper traveled aboard his father's shipping vessels as supercargo. He is known to have visited Cuba, Russia, and Spain.

In 1832 Hooper married Ann Sturgis, daughter of William Sturgis, and he became a junior partner in the Boston firm of Bryant and Sturgis, merchants in the California hide trade, trade with the Pacific Northwest, and trade with China.

== Business career ==
In 1841, Hooper partnered with counting house owner and merchant shipper William Appleton to form William Appleton and Company. Soon the firm was engaged in the California hide trade, trade with the Pacific Northwest, and trade with China. The firm acquired additional partners in 1851 when Appleton joined the Massachusetts congressional delegation.

In 1859, Appleton retired from William Appleton and Company. Hooper reorganized the firm with partner Franklin Gordon Dexter, and they adopted the name Samuel Hooper and Company. The firm continued operations after Hooper's death.

== Political career ==
Hooper was elected to the Massachusetts House of Representatives, serving from 1851 to 1853. He later served in the Massachusetts Senate in 1858.

Upon the resignation of his friend and former partner, Congressman William Appleton from the United States House of Representatives, Hooper was elected to fill the seat, representing Massachusetts's fifth district in the 37th Congress.

He was reelected to the following six congresses representing Massachusetts's fourth district and served as chairman of the Committee on Ways and Means 1869 to 1871, of the Committee on Banking and Currency from 1871 to 1873 and of the Committee on Coinage, Weights and Measures from 1871 to 1875.

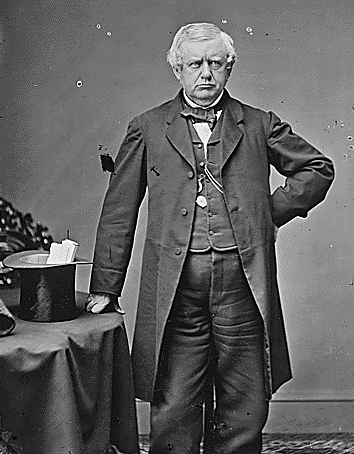
Samuel Hooper

From 1861 to 1862, his home in Washington D.C. was the headquarters of General George B. McClellan. Hooper likewise permitted Andrew Johnson to reside there for the first several weeks after Abraham Lincoln's death, until Mrs. Lincoln was ready to vacate the White House. In 1866, Hooper was a delegate to the Philadelphia Loyalists' Convention.

He turned down reelection to the 44th Congress and died less than a month before completion of his final term. He was interred in Oak Hill Cemetery in 1875.

Hooper was briefly the father-in-law of Charles Sumner, a powerful senator from Massachusetts. Sumner had married Hooper's widowed daughter-in law, Alice Mason Hooper, but they divorced after a short marriage.

== Philanthropy ==
In 1865 Hooper founded the Hooper School of Mining and Practical Geology at Harvard University with an endowment of $50,000. The gift also established the Sturgis Hooper Professorship in Geology. Named in honor of Hooper's deceased son Sturgis, the professorship received an additional endowment of $30,000 (~$836,533 in 2024) from Hooper's widow in 1881. The city of Hooper, Nebraska, is named after him.

== Publications ==
- Currency or money: its nature and uses and the effects of the circulation of bank-notes for currency (1855)
- An Examination of the Theory and the Effect of Laws Regulating the Amount of Specie in Banks (1860)
- A defence of the merchants of Boston against aspersions of the Hon. John Z. Goodrich, ex-collector of customs (1866)

== See also ==
- List of members of the United States Congress who died in office (1790–1899)

U.S. House of Representatives
Preceded by William Appleton	Member of the U.S. House of Representatives from Massachusetts's 5th congressional district 1861–1863	Succeeded by John B. Alley
Preceded by Alexander H. Rice	Member of the U.S. House of Representatives from Massachusetts's 4th congressional district 1863–1875	Succeeded by Josiah G. Abbott
Preceded by Robert C. Schenck	Chair of the House Ways and Means Committee; 1871	Succeeded by Henry L. Dawes
Preceded by James A. Garfield	Chair of the House Banking Committee; 1871–1872	Succeeded by Horace Maynard
Preceded by William D. Kelley	Chair of the House Coinage Committee; 1872–1875	Succeeded by Sherman Otis Houghton
