= Mount Gilbert (Chugach Mountains) =

Mountain in Alaska, U.S.

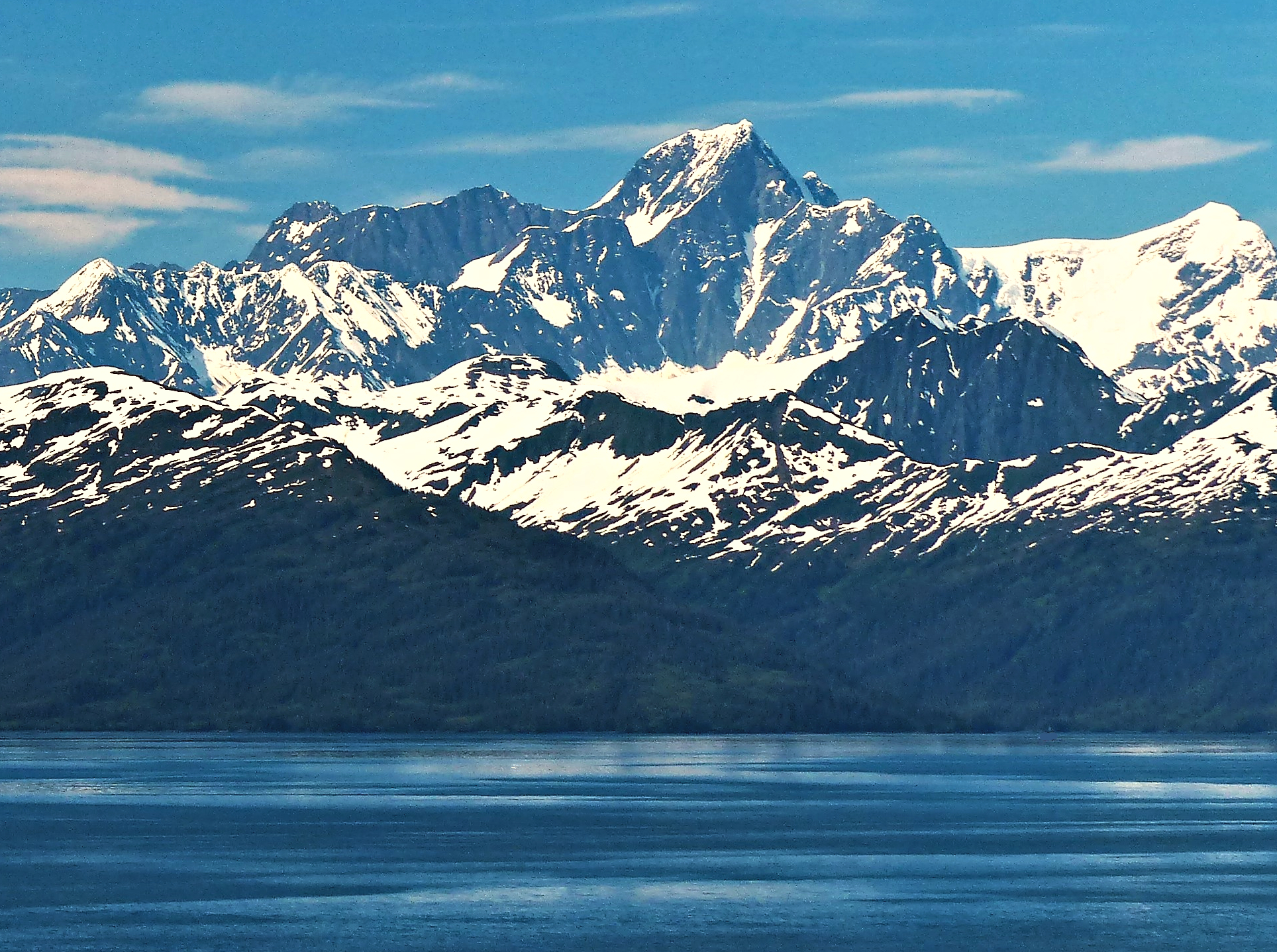
- Mount Gilbert, south aspect

Highest point
- Elevation: 9,638 ft (2,938 m)
- Prominence: 2,638 ft (804 m)
- Parent peak: Mount Gannett
- Isolation: 4.6 mi (7.4 km)
- Coordinates: 61°10′20″N 148°16′15″W

Geography
- Location within Alaska
- Interactive map of Mount Gilbert
- Location: Chugach National Forest; Chugach Census Area; Alaska, United States
- Parent range: Chugach Mountains
- Topo map: USGS Anchorage A-4

Climbing
- First ascent: 1962
- Easiest route: Mountaineering

Mount Gilbert is a prominent 9,638-foot (2,938 m) glaciated mountain summit located in the Chugach Mountains, in the U.S. state of Alaska. The peak is situated 54 mi (87 km) east of Anchorage, 32 mi (51 km) northeast of Whittier, and 5.8 mi (9 km) northeast of Mount Muir, on land managed by Chugach National Forest. Although modest in elevation, relief is significant since the mountain rises up from tidewater at Harriman Fiord in Prince William Sound in less than six miles.

== History ==
The peak was named in 1908 by Ulysses Sherman Grant and Daniel F. Higgins for Grove Karl Gilbert (1843-1918), a geologist with the United States Geological Survey who was part of the 1899 Harriman Alaska expedition that explored this area. The mountain's name was officially adopted in 1910 by the U.S. Board on Geographic Names.

On June 14, 1960, a Pacific Northern Airlines Lockheed L-749A Constellation aircraft crashed near the summit, killing all 14 persons aboard. It was on the final leg of a flight from Seattle to Anchorage, after having just dropped off 52 cannery workers and fishermen in Cordova.

The first ascent of the peak was made May 29, 1962, by Paul B. Crews, Hans Metz, Helga Bading, and Bob Bailey, in what was described as poor weather conditions.

== Climate ==
Based on the Köppen climate classification, Mount Gilbert is located in a subarctic climate zone with long, cold, snowy winters, and cool summers. Temperatures can drop below −20 °C with wind chill factors below −30 °C. This climate supports the Serpentine Glacier to the south, Colony Glacier to the north and west, and the Barry and Cascade Glaciers to the east. The months May through June offer the most favorable weather for climbing.

== Gallery ==
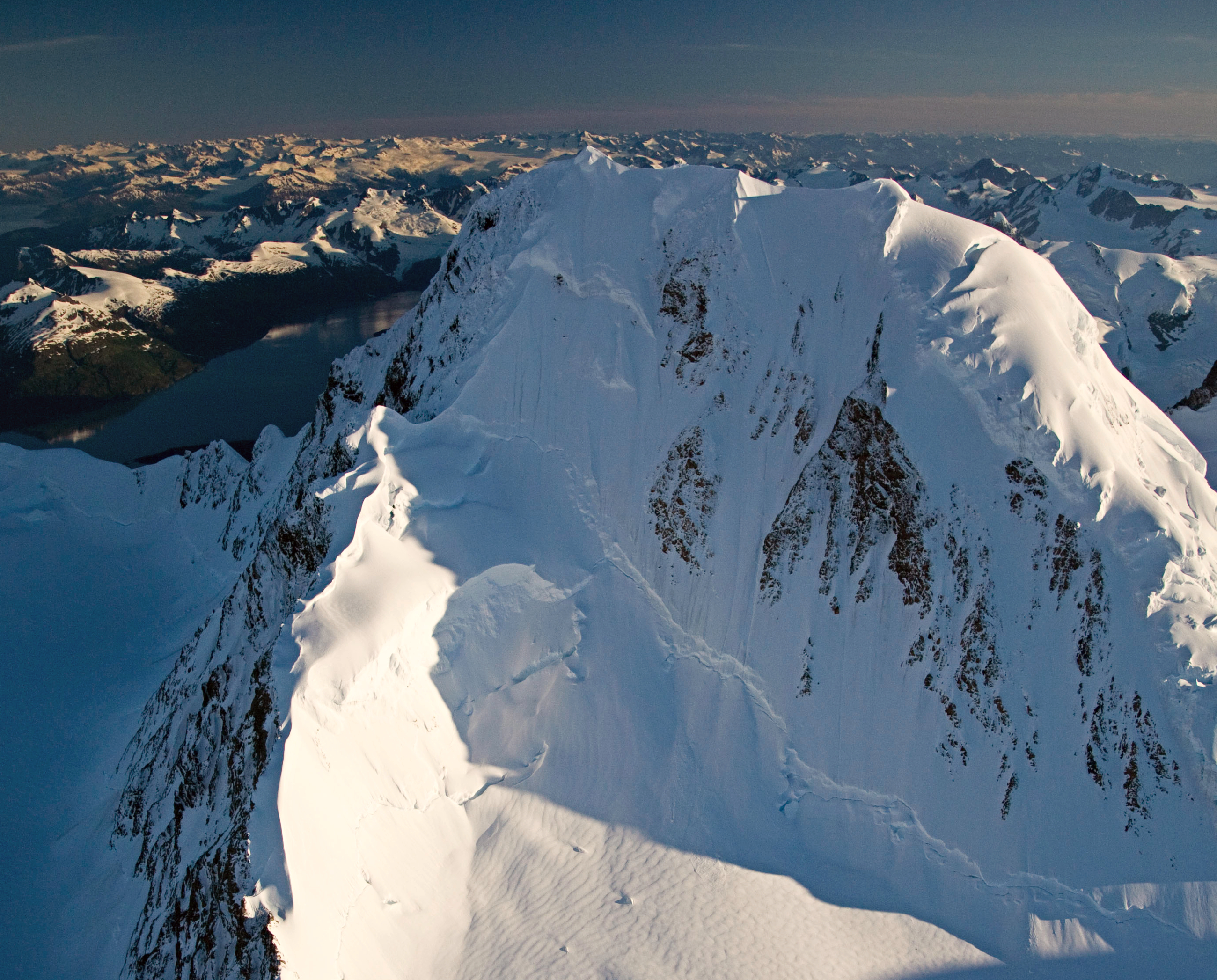
Aerial view of summit from north

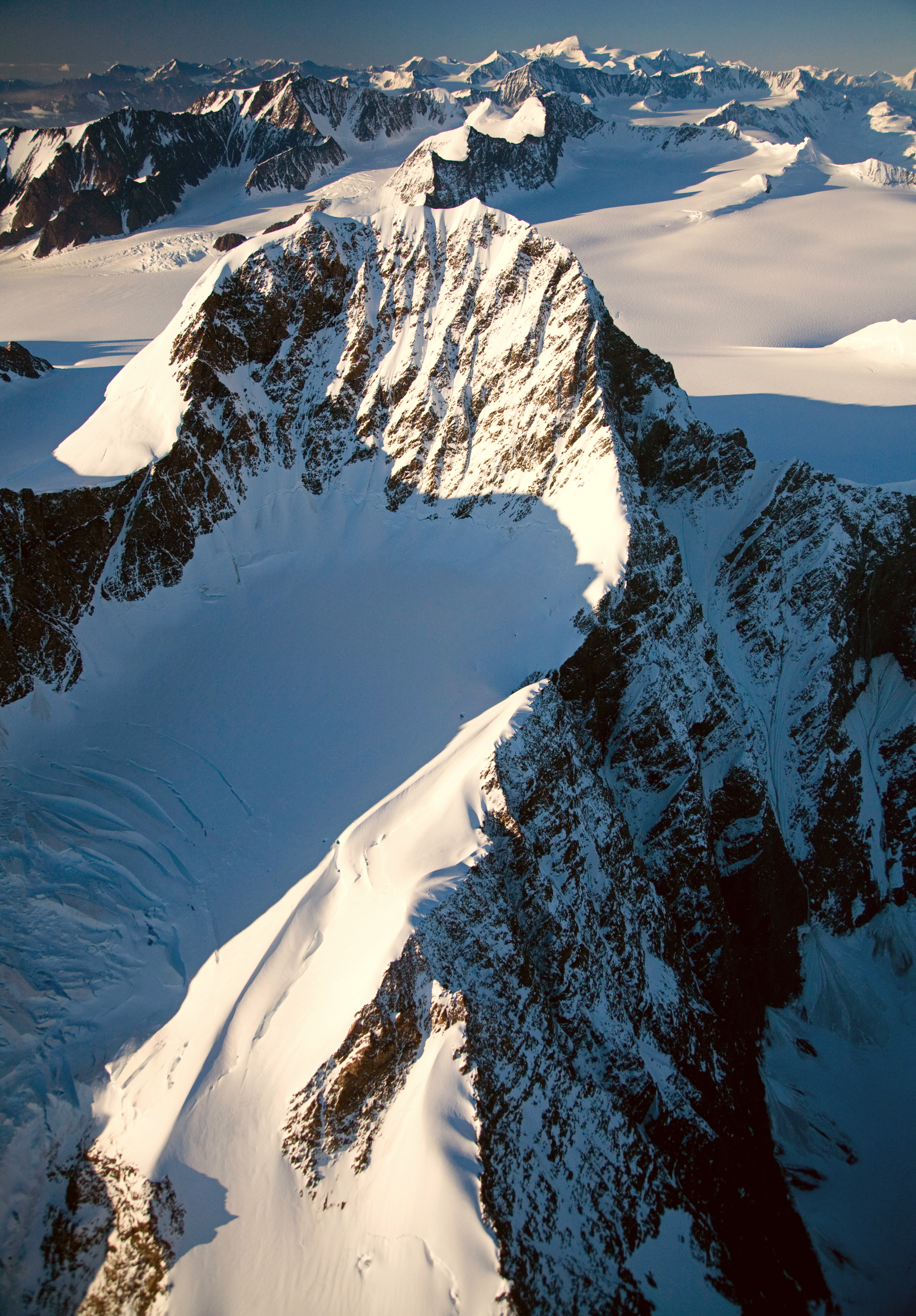
Aerial view from west

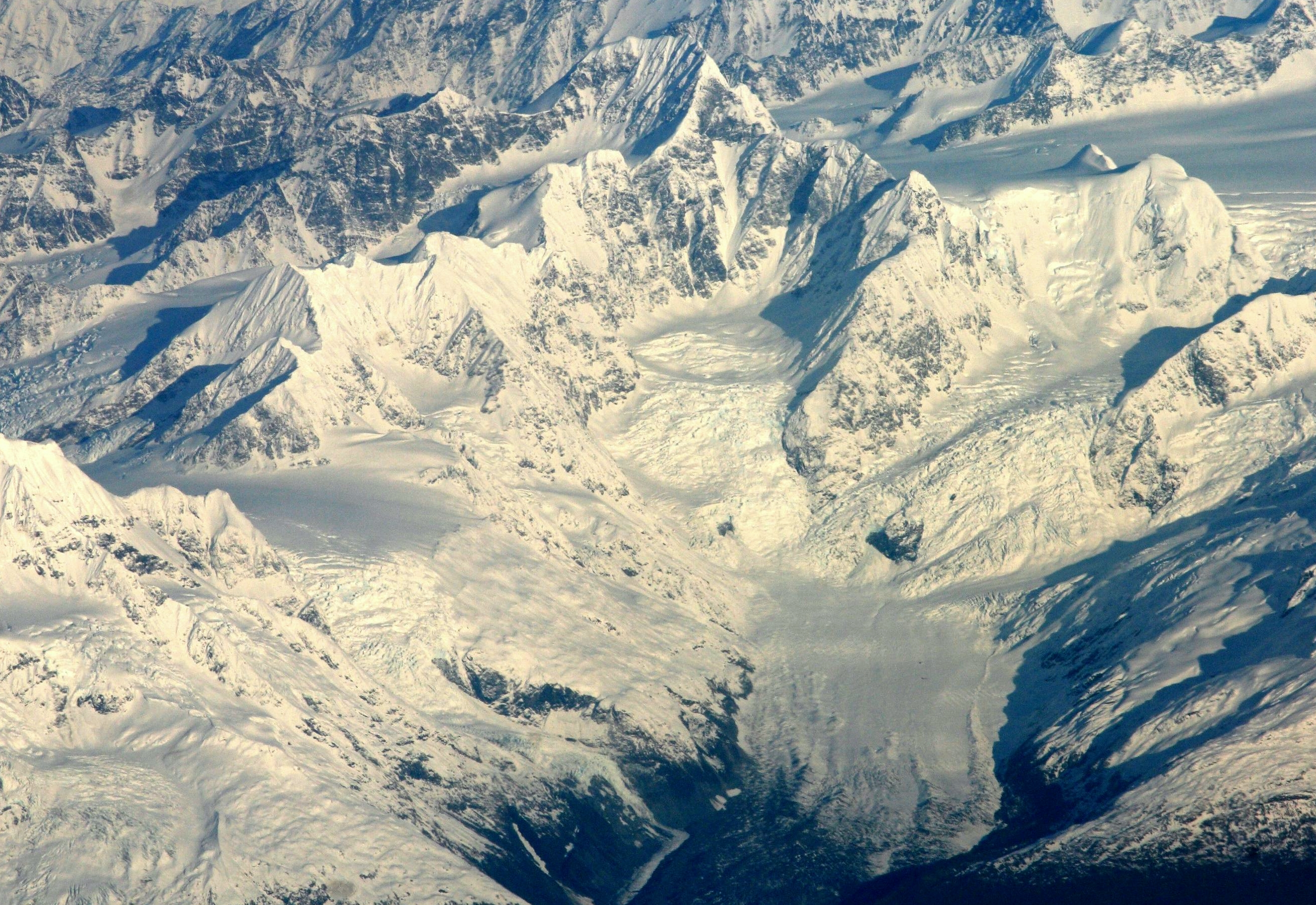
Aerial view from the south

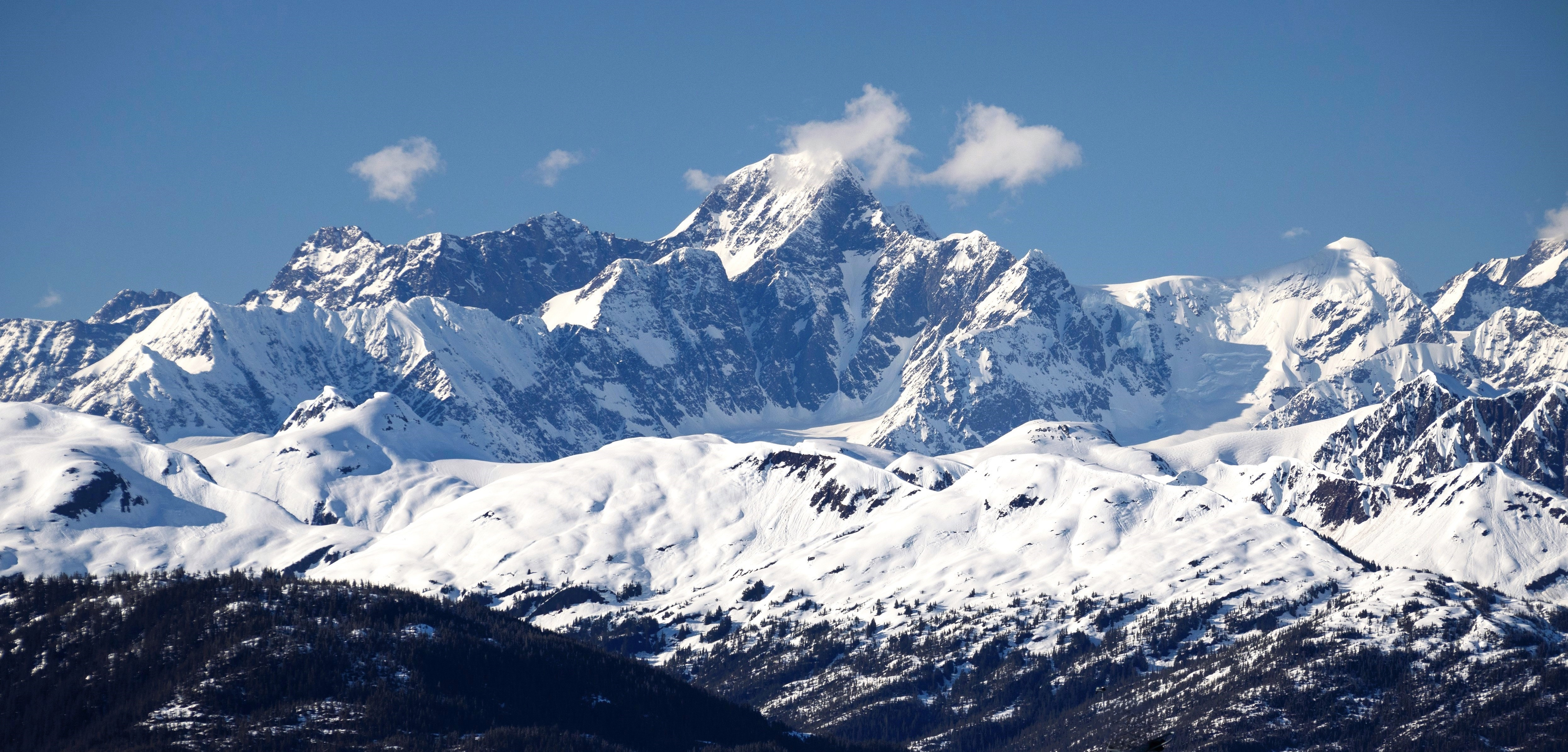
South aspect

== See also ==
- List of mountain peaks of Alaska
- Geography of Alaska
