= Mount Gannett =

Mountain in Alaska, United States

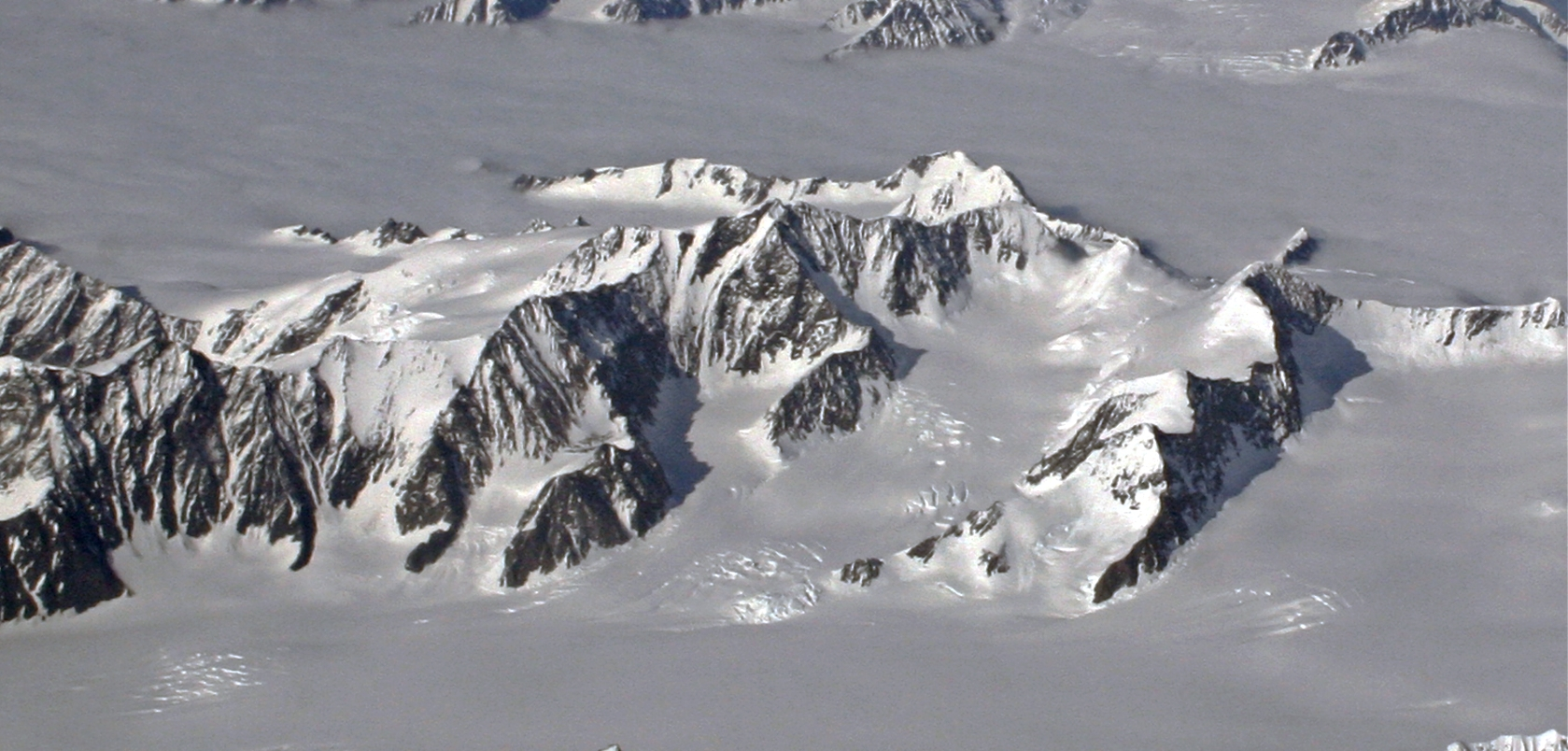

Highest point
- Elevation: 9,629 ft (2,935 m)
- Prominence: 4,300 ft (1,300 m)
- Coordinates: 61°14′32″N 148°11′36″W

Geography
- Location within Alaska
- Interactive map of Mount Gannett
- Location: Valdez-Cordova Census Area, Alaska, United States
- Parent range: Chugach Mountains

Climbing
- First ascent: unclimbed

Mount Gannett is a 9,629-foot (2,935 m) peak in the Chugach Mountains of eastern Alaska, United States, located 50 miles (80 km) east of the city of Anchorage. It was named by Lawrence Martin of the U.S. Geological Survey in 1911 for Henry Gannett. One arm of the Knik Glacier flows from the ice fields of Mount Gannett's north and east slopes, and the Colony Glacier rises on the west and southwest slopes, flowing into Inner Lake George. In between, the Gannett Glacier flows down a narrow valley northwest of the summit to join the Knik Glacier. The mountain has an estimated topographic prominence of 4,300 feet (1,300 m).

== 1952 military transport plane crash ==
On November 22, 1952, a United States Air Force Douglas C-124 Globemaster II military transport aircraft crashed high on the southern slopes of the mountain. All of the 52 people on board were killed. Remains of the plane and the crash victims began to appear at the foot of the Colony Glacier in 2012.

== Gallery ==
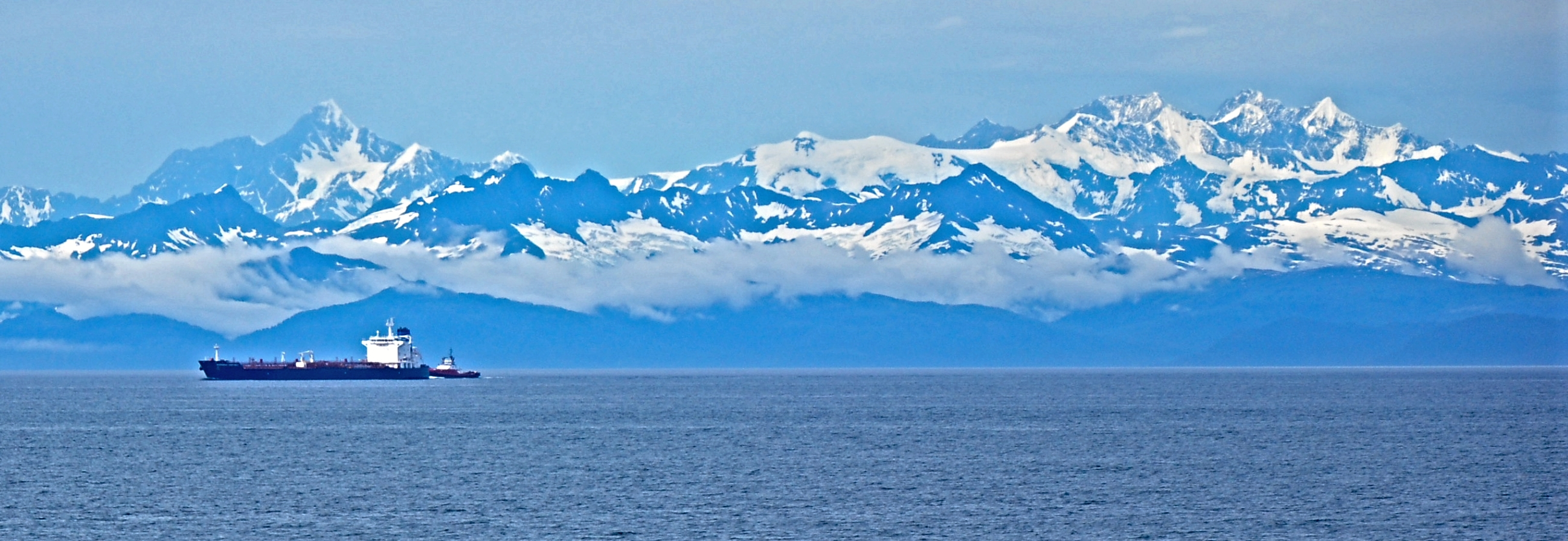
Mount Gilbert (left) and Mount Gannett (right) from Prince William Sound
