= Harvard University School of Mining and Practical Geology =

Former U.S. mining school (1865–1875)

- Other names: Harvard School of Mining and Practical Geology
- Type: Private
- Active: 1865–1875
- Parent institution: Harvard University
- Endowment: US$50,000
- President: Thomas Hill Charles W. Eliot
- Academic staff: Thomas Hill, Asa Gray, Joseph Lovering, Henry L. Eustis, Josiah D. Whitney, Wolcott Gibbs, Josiah P. Cooke Raphael Pumpelly Joseph Winlock, William H. Pettee, Nathaniel S. Shaler
- Location: Cambridge, Massachusetts

The Harvard University School of Mining and Practical Geology was founded at Harvard University in 1865 on a $50,000 endowment provided by philanthropist Samuel Hooper. The endowment also established the Sturgis Hooper Professorship of Geology. Closely affiliated with Lawrence Scientific School, the mining school operated for ten years with low enrollment then closed in 1875.

== History ==
National awareness of unexploited natural resources accompanied the westward expansion of the United States, and in the 1860s it became evident to Louis Agassiz, dean of the Lawrence Scientific School, and Congressional Delegate Samuel Hooper that Harvard should develop a mining school. Hooper's endowment of $50,000 included funding to establish not only the School of Mining and Practical Geology but the Sturgis Hooper Professorship of Geology.

The school opened in 1865 with faculty members from the Lawrence Scientific School, and Geologist Josiah D. Whitney was hired as the first occupant of the Sturgis Hooper chair. Whitney had begun a geological survey of California in 1860, a task that would not be completed until 1874. Upon his appointment to the Sturgis Hooper chair in 1865, he was given an unpaid, indefinite leave of absence and did not begin teaching at Harvard until 1875.

In 1867 Whitney arranged for Raphael Pumpelly to become a professor of mining at the school, although Pumpelly did not begin teaching until 1869 and resigned his post in 1871.

Whitney led an expedition of four students from the school to the Collegiate Peaks in 1869. The group included Whitney's friend, Yale University professor William Henry Brewer. During the trip, Mount Harvard and Mount Yale were named.

From its beginning, the school included a highly prestigious faculty. Unfortunately, enrollment remained low even when world-renowned geologist Raphael Pumpelly was hired. Pumpelly's resignation in 1871 further burdened the school as did Whitney's ongoing absences. The school closed in 1875, a year after enrollment dropped to zero. Members of the faculty returned to the Lawrence Scientific School where a degree in mining engineering was established.

== Course of instruction, 1865 ==
A degree of mining engineer was conferred upon graduates who completed the following course of instruction:

=== First year ===
- Analytical Geometry
- Descriptive Geometry
- Surveying and Mechanical Drawing
- French
- German

- Differential and Integral Calculus
- Mechanical Drawing
- Crystallography
- French
- German

=== Second year ===
- Mechanics
- Physics
- Chemistry
- French
- German

- Mechanics
- Descriptive Mineralogy
- Analytical Chemistry
- French
- German

=== Third and fourth year ===
Coursework had not been determined in 1865, but attention would be given to the following subjects:

Geodesy
Geology and Physical Geography
Metallurgy
Mining

== Course of instruction, 1874 ==
Lawrence Scientific School provided the first three years of engineering instruction for the degree of mining engineer. During their fourth year, students in the mining school completed the following courses:

- Economical Geology and the Phenomena of Veins
- Mining Machinery and the Exploitation of Mines
- General and Practical Metallurgy
- Assaying
- Working up, Plotting, and Writing out Notes of Summer Excursions
