= List of Alaska Routes =

- Shields used for Alaska Routes

Highway names
- Interstates: Interstate A-n (A-n) (unsigned)
- State: Alaska Route n (AK-n) or Route n

System links
- Alaska Routes; Interstate; Scenic Byways

Alaska Routes are both numbered and named. There have been only twelve state highway numbers issued (1 through 11 and 98), and the numbering often has no obvious pattern. For example, Alaska Route 4 (AK-4) runs north and south, whereas AK-2 runs largely east and west, but runs north and south passing through and to the north of Fairbanks. The Klondike Highway, built in 1978, was unnumbered until 1998, when it was given its designation during the centennial of the Klondike Gold Rush. However, many Alaskan highways of greater length than the Klondike Highway remain unnumbered.

Mileposts, frequently used for road markers and official addressing in rural areas, are also more commonly reckoned by landmark names.

Within Alaska, roads are almost invariably referred to by name or general destination, and not by number(s).

Numbered routes often span multiple highway names. For example, AK-1 can refer to any of the Glenn Highway, Seward Highway, Sterling Highway, or Tok Cut-Off; meanwhile, portions of the Seward Highway are numbered AK-1, AK-9 and Interstate A3 (A-3).

Besides the roads, there are car ferries and other ways of transporting vehicles on water, such as barges and ice roads. These provide car access to places without continuous road connection. The car ferries are known as Alaska Marine Highway.

== Highways ==
=== U.S. Highways ===

The Alaskan portion of the Alaska Highway was proposed to be designated part of U.S. Highway 97 (US-97), but this was never carried out. Certain prior editions of USGS topographic maps, mostly published during the 1950s, do bear the US-97 highway shield along or near portions of the current AK-2.

=== Alaska numbered highways ===
Number	Length (mi)	Length (km)	Southern or western terminus	Northern or eastern terminus	Local names	Formed	Removed	Notes
AK-1	545.92	878.57	Marine Highway in Homer	AK-2 (Alaska Highway) in Tok	Sterling Highway, Seward Highway, Glenn Highway, Richardson Highway, Tok Cut-Off	—	—	Longest numbered state highway in Alaska
AK-2	456.91	735.33	Dead end in Manley Hot Springs	Hwy 1 (Alaska Highway) at the Alcan–Beaver Creek Border Crossing in Alcan Border	Elliott Highway, Steese Highway, Richardson Highway, Alaska Highway	—	—	
AK-3	323	520	AK-1 (Glenn Highway) in Gateway	AK-2 (Richardson Highway) in Fairbanks	George Parks Highway	1971	current	
AK-4	266	428	Marine Highway in Valdez	AK-2 (Alaska Highway) in Delta Junction	Richardson Highway	—	—	
AK-5	109	175	AK-2 (Alaska Highway) in Tetlin Junction	Front Street in Eagle	Taylor Highway, Top of the World Highway	—	—	Formerly continued north to end of Taylor Highway at Eagle.
AK-6	161	259	AK-2 (Elliot Highway) in Fox	River Road in Circle	Steese Highway	—	—	
AK-7	31.7	51.0	Dead end in Ketchikan	Dead end in Ward Cove	South Tongass Highway, North Tongass Highway	—	—	Ketchikan segment; connected by the Marine Highway
AK-7	34.21	55.06	Dead end on Mitkof Island	Sandy Beach Road in Petersburg	Mitkof Highway, Nordic Drive	—	—	Petersburg segment; connected by the Marine Highway
AK-7	39.01	62.78	Franklin Street in Juneau	Dead end in Juneau	Egan Drive, Old Glacier Highway (Out the road)	—	—	Juneau segment; connected by the Marine Highway
AK-7	39.7	63.9	Front Street in Haines	Hwy 3 at the Dalton Cache–Pleasant Camp Border Crossing near Mosquito Lake	Haines Highway	—	—	Haines segment
AK-8	135	217	AK-3 (George Parks Highway) in Cantwell	AK-4 (Richardson Highway) in Paxson	Denali Highway	—	—	
AK-9	36.49	58.72	Railway Avenue in Seward	AK-1 (Sterling Highway) at Tern Lake junction	Seward Highway	—	—	
AK-10	83.5	134.4	AK-4 (Richardson Highway) in Copper Center	Dead end in McCarthy	Edgerton Highway, McCarthy Road	—	—	
AK-10	49.5	79.7	Marine Highway in Cordova	The Million Dollar Bridge	Copper River Highway	—	—	
AK-11	414	666	AK-2 Elliott Highway in Livengood	East Lake Colleen Drive in Deadhorse	Dalton Highway	1978	current	
AK-98	13.4	21.6	Marine Highway in Skagway	Hwy 2 near Fraser, BC	Klondike Highway	1998	current	Shortest numbered state highway in Alaska

=== Alaska named highways ===
Highways listed below are not signed as numbered state routes.

Number	Length (mi)	Length (km)	Southern or western terminus	Northern or eastern terminus	Formed	Removed	Notes
Alaska Peninsula Highway	—	—	Naknek	King Salmon	—	—	
Alyeska Highway	—	—	AK-1 Seward Highway in Girdwood	Arlberg Avenue in Girdwood	—	—	
Chena Hot Springs Road	—	—	Old Steese Highway north of Fairbanks	Chena Hot Springs	—	—	
Douglas Highway	—	—	Douglas Island	Douglas Island	—	—	
Hope Highway	17.861	28.744	AK-1 (Seward Highway) near Hope	Porcupine Campgrounds in Hope	c. 1928	current	Forest Highway 14 inside Chugach National Forest
Johansen Expressway	4.2	6.8	University Avenue in College	AK-2 (Steese Expressway) in Fairbanks	—	—	Only highway in Alaska to have exit numbers
Kenai Spur Highway	38.787	62.422	AK-1 (Sterling Highway) in Soldotna	Bay Beach Road in Nikiski	c. 1951	current	On the Kenai Peninsula
Minnesota Drive Expressway	7.560	12.167	Old Seward Highway in Anchorage	West 15th Avenue in Anchorage	c. 1950	current	
Nome–Council Highway	71.970	115.824	Nome Bypass Road / Front Street in Nome	Dead end at Niukluk River in Council	1906	current	
Nome–Taylor Highway	—	—	Nome	Taylor	—	—	
Nome–Teller Highway	72	116	Nome	Teller	—	—	Also called the Bob Blodgett Highway
Old Glenn Highway	—	—	AK-1 Glenn Highway near Eklutna	AK-1 Glenn Highway in Palmer	—	—	
Palmer–Wasilla Highway	—	—	AK-1 Glenn Highway in Palmer	Knik-Goose Bay Road in Wasilla	—	—	
Portage Glacier Highway	11.59	18.65	AK-1 (Seward Highway) in Portage	Marine Highway in Whittier	2000	current	
Salmon River Road	11.710	18.845	Wharf near Canada–United States border in Hyder, Alaska	Canada–United States border near Premier, British Columbia (Granduc Road)	—	—	Known as NFD 88 Road inside Tongass National Forest
Tofty/Tanana Road	50	80	Yukon River near Tanana	AK-2 (Elliott Highway) in Manley Hot Springs	2016	current	Tofty and Tanana Roads are separately designated but share continuous milepost numbering. Tofty road ends at mile marker 15. Western terminus functions as a boat ramp or ice road landing depending on season, providing access to Tanana.
Taylor Highway	64	103	AK-5 (Top of the World Highway) near Jack Wade	Front Street in Eagle	—	—	Formerly part of AK-5.
Zimovia Highway	14	23	Wrangell	McCormick Creek Road in Wrangell	—	—	

== Marine Highway system ==
The Alaska Marine Highway and several other Alaska highways or routes are recognized as "highways" eligible for federal funding by the Federal Highway Administration (FHWA). The Marine Highway was declared a National Scenic Byway by the FHWA on June 13, 2002; and later declared an All-American Road on September 22, 2005.

The system is divided into different regions of service: Southeast, Cross-Gulf, Prince William Sound, South-Central, and Southwest.

== Gallery ==
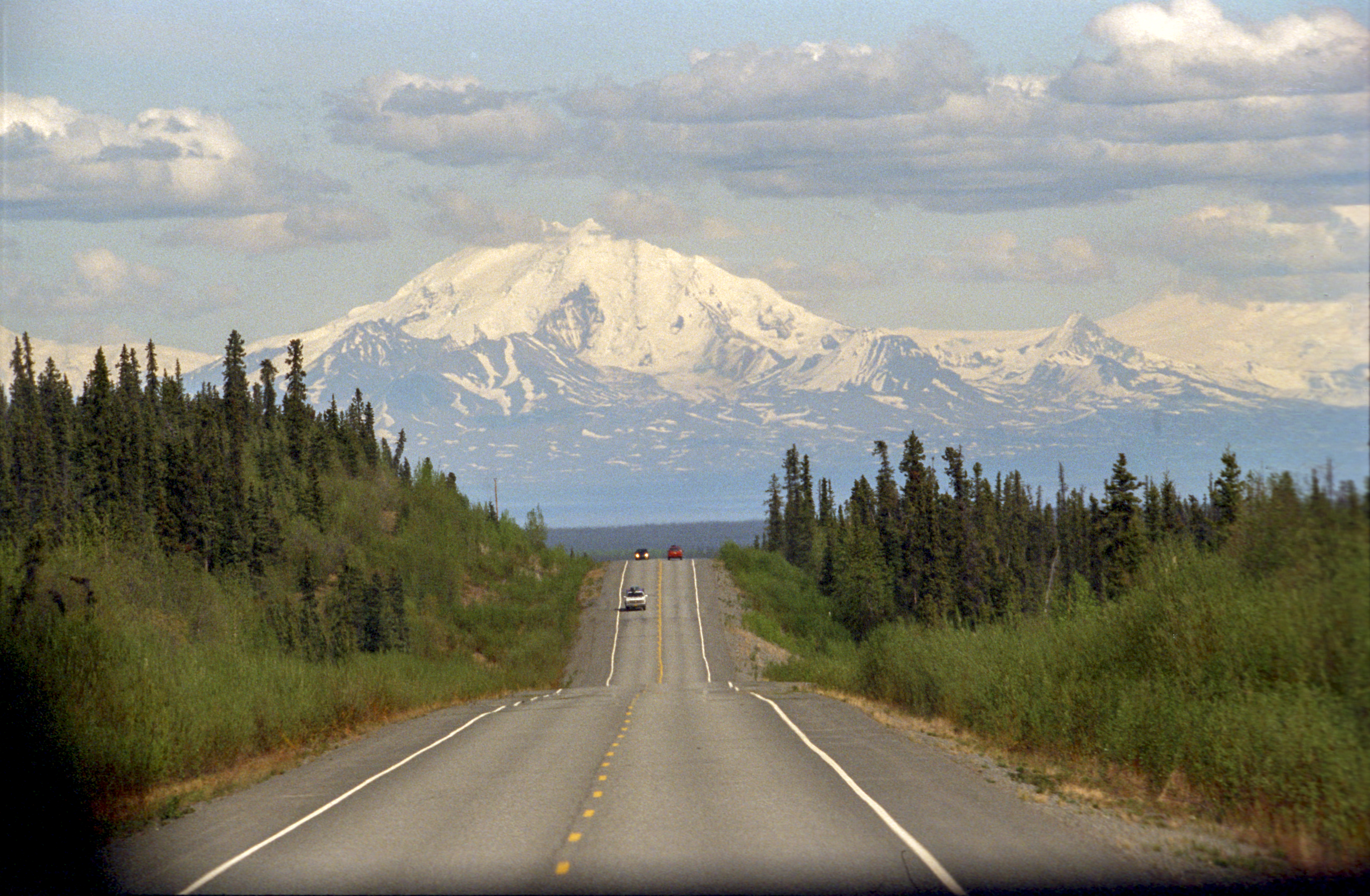
The Glenn Highway, eastbound near Glennallen, is part of Interstate A1.

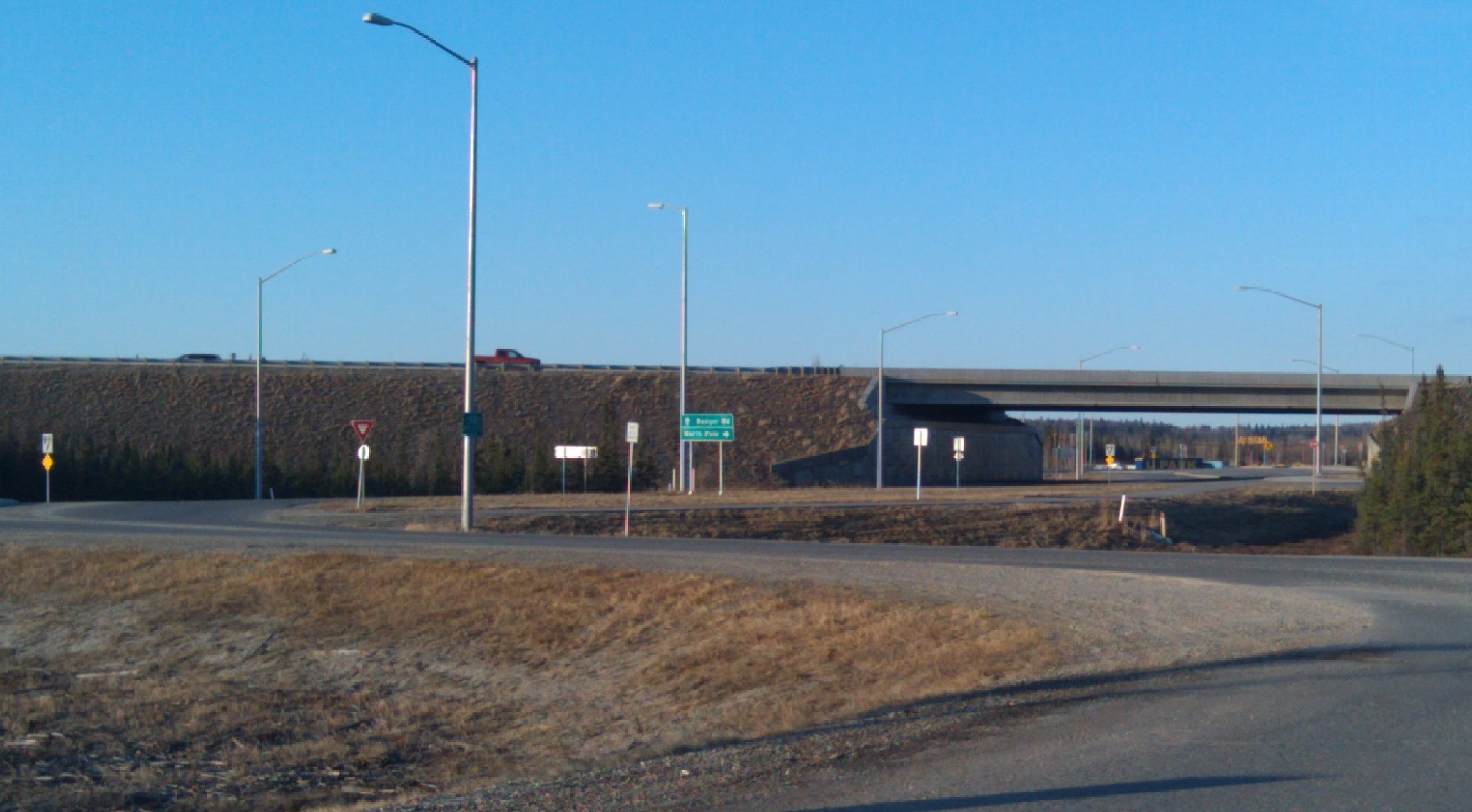
An interchange between the Richardson Highway, part of Interstate A2, and Badger Road in Fairbanks.

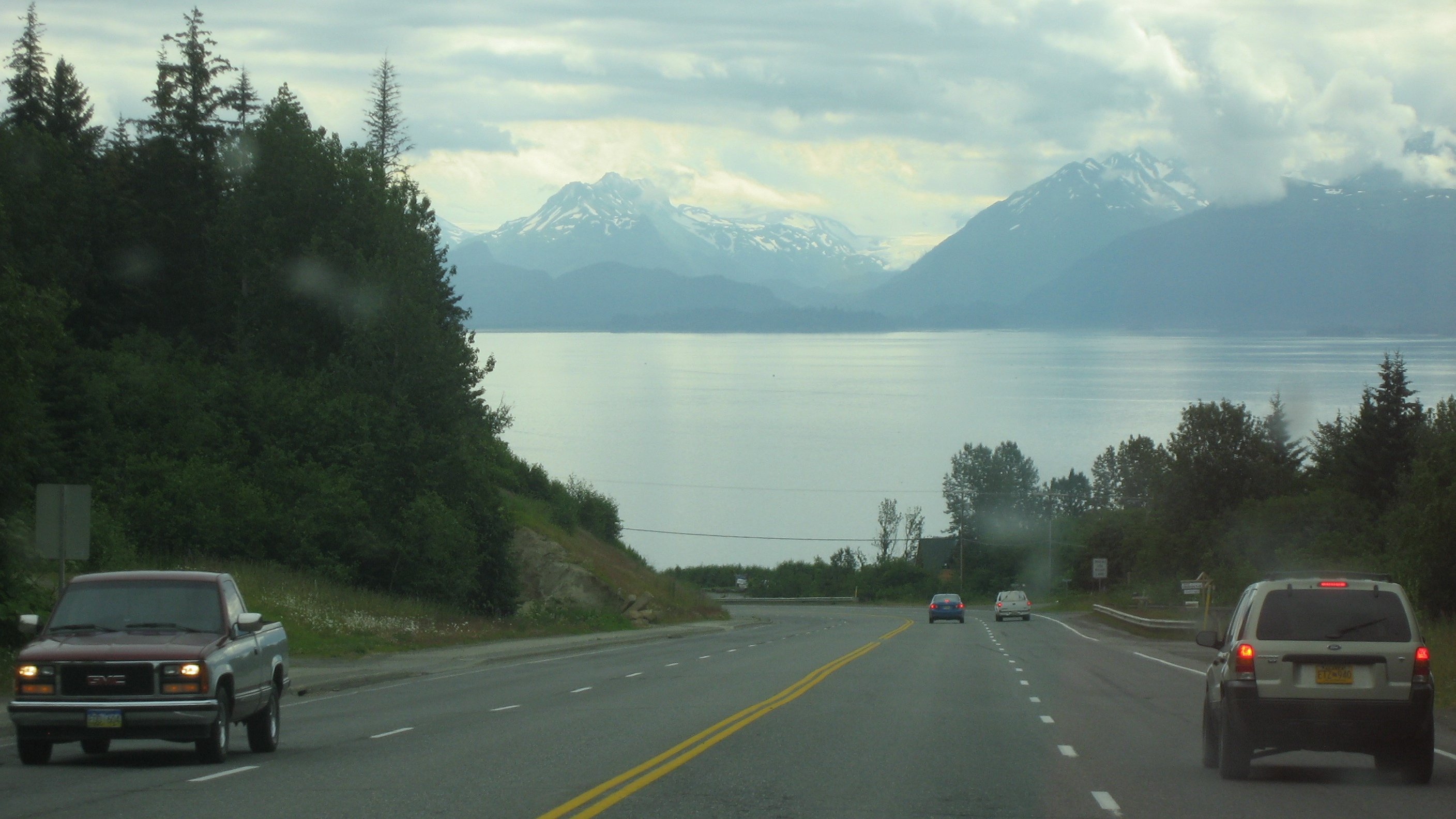
The Sterling Highway, westbound near Homer, is part of Interstate A3.

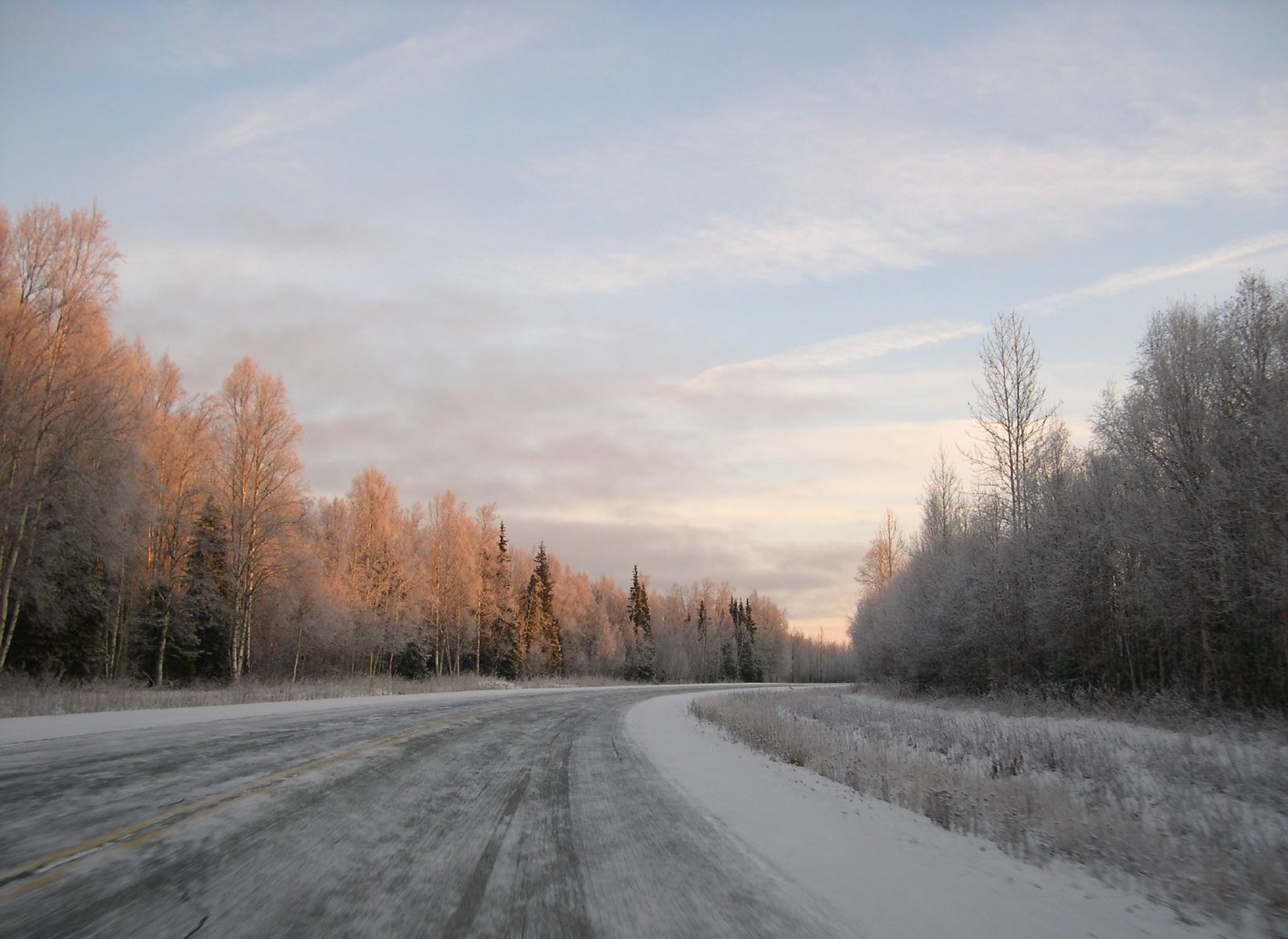
The George Parks Highway, which comprises the entirety of Interstate A4.

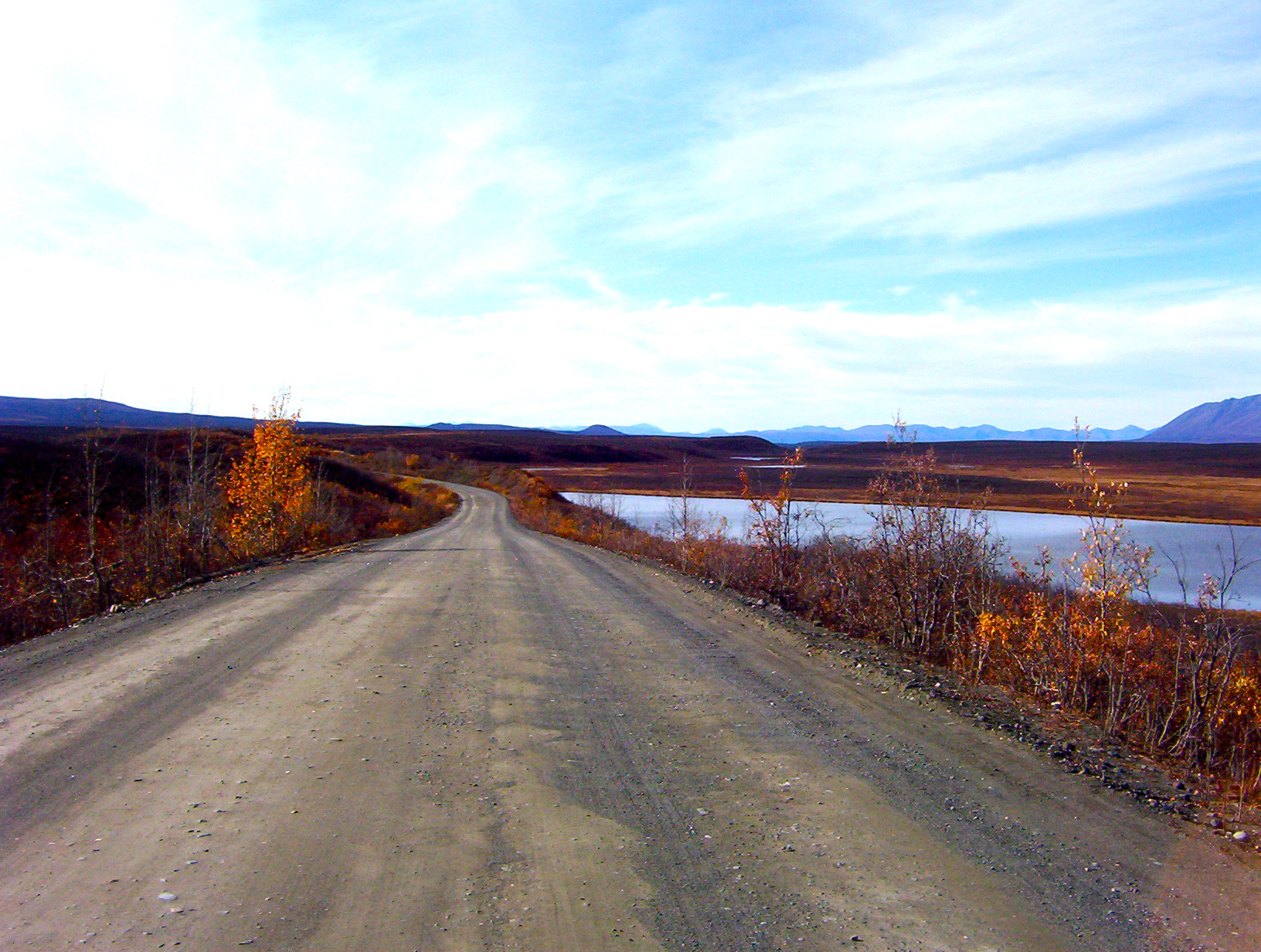
The Denali Highway has only 23 miles (37 km) of pavement, the remaining 123 miles (198 km) is gravel. The road is closed in the winter months.

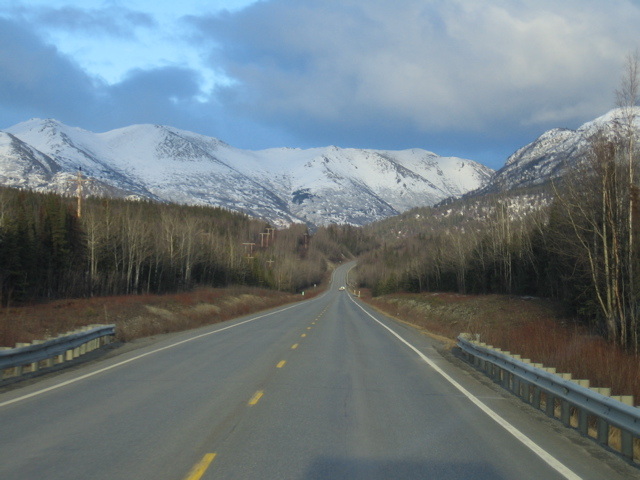
The Sterling Highway is a typical example of what is considered a highway in Alaska; four lane restricted-access routes are not used outside of the largest cities.

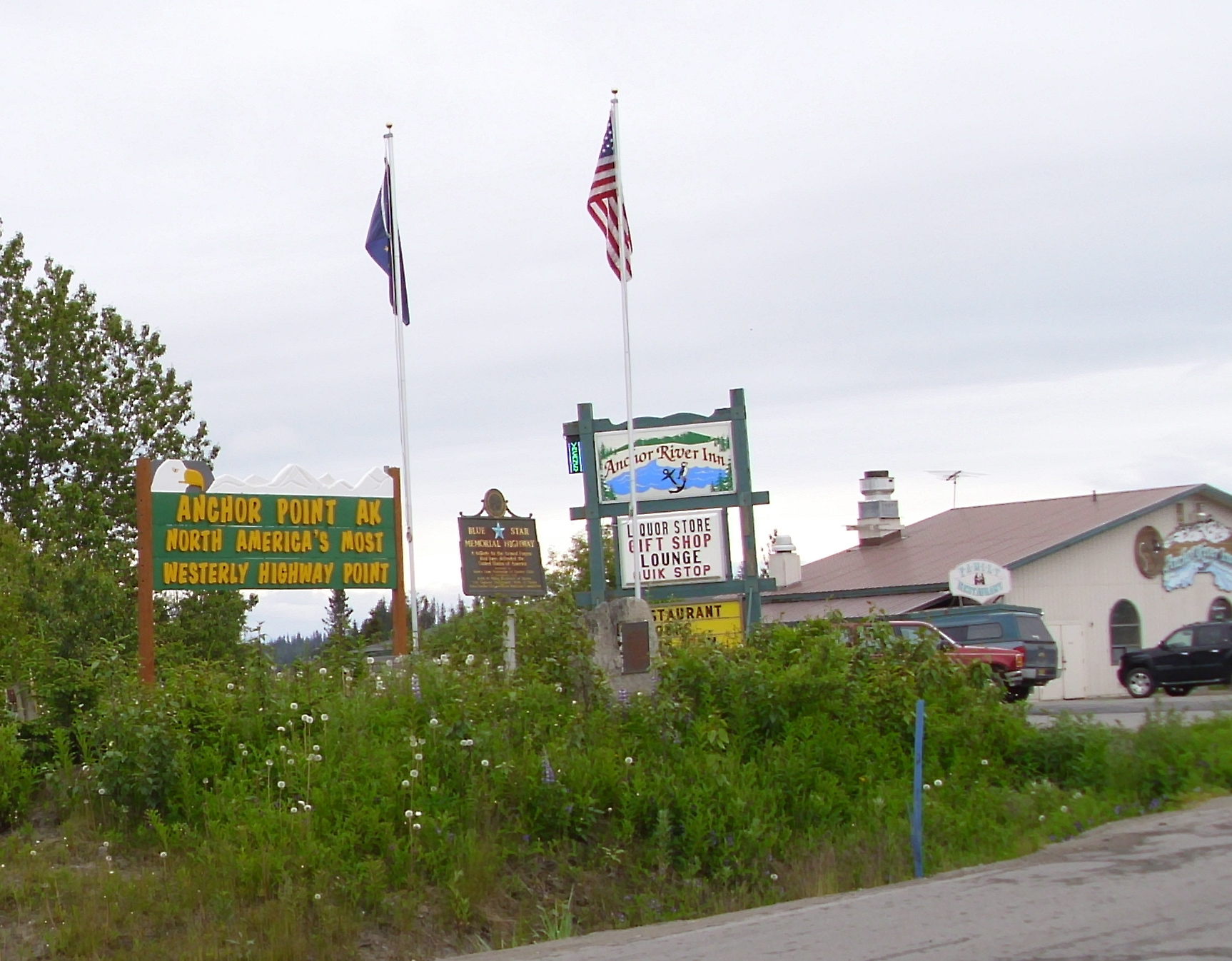
Anchor Point claims the distinction of being the most westerly point on the contiguous highway system in North America.

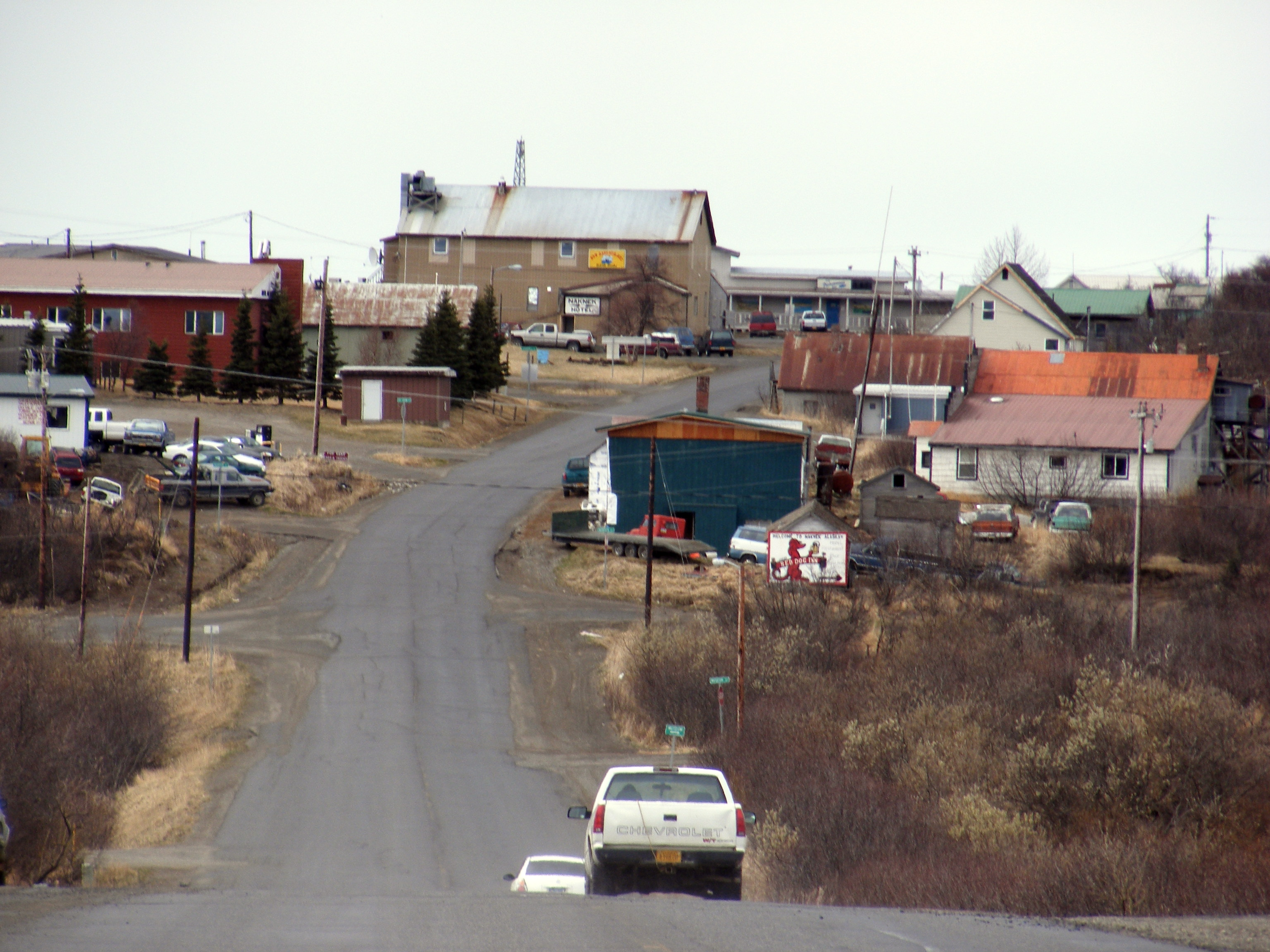
Alaska Peninsula Highway approaching "downtown" Naknek.

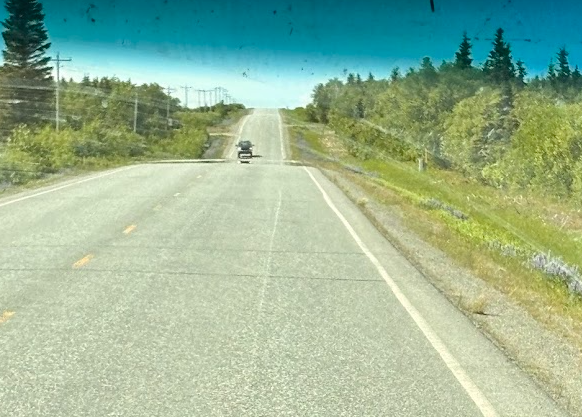
Alaska Peninsula highway, just outside of King Salmon

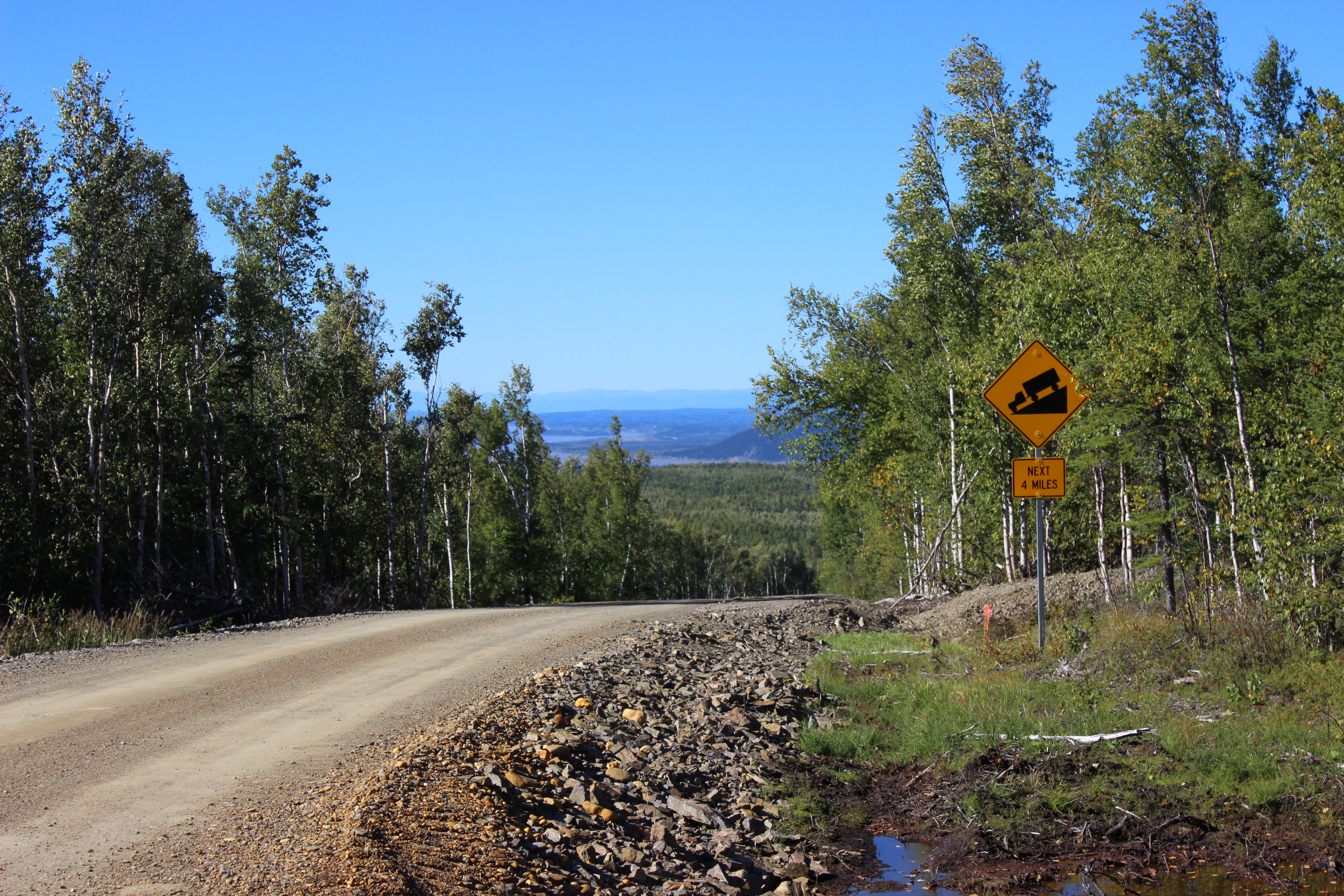
Tanana Road after opening in August 2016.

== See also ==
- List of British Columbia provincial highways
- List of Yukon territorial highways
- The Milepost
