= Zimovia =

Zimovia may refer to:

- Zimovia Highway
- Zimovia Strait
