= Johansen Expressway =

Highway in Alaska

- Woodrow Johansen Expressway
- Johansen Expressway highlighted in red

Route information
- Length: 4.2 mi (6.8 km)

Major junctions
- West end: University Avenue / Geist Road in College
- Old Steese Highway in Fairbanks
- East end: AK-2 (Steese Expressway) in Fairbanks

Location
- Country: United States
- State: Alaska
- Boroughs: Fairbanks North Star

Highway system
- Alaska Routes; Interstate; Scenic Byways

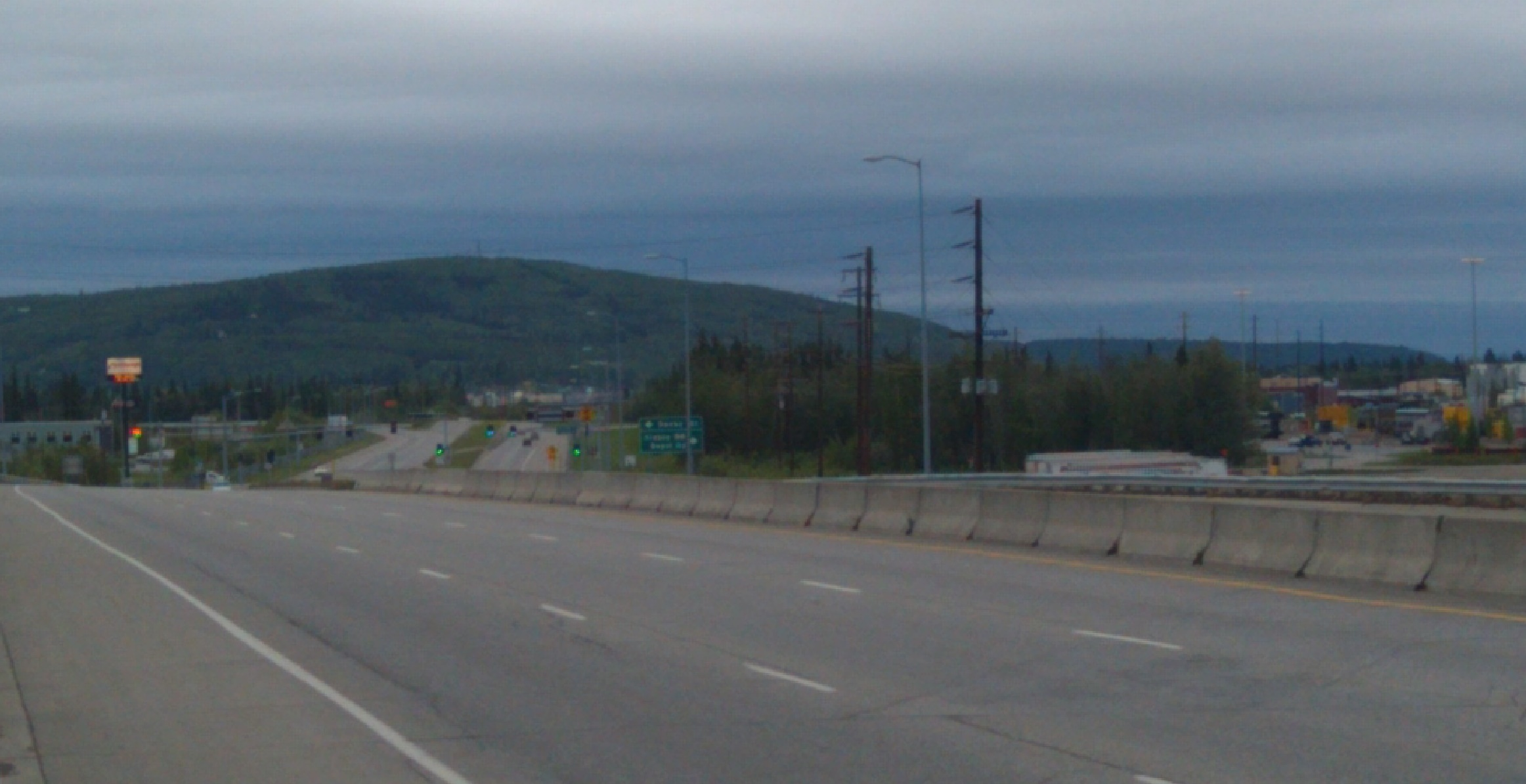
Johansen Expressway

The Johansen Expressway (formally, the Woodrow Johansen Expressway) is a 4.2-mile-long (6.8 km) expressway in Fairbanks, Alaska, United States. The Johansen Expressway serves as a northern bypass to the city, and is notable for being the only highway in Alaska to have exit numbers.

== History ==
Named the Geist Road Extension for most of its planning period, the highway was named in 1988 in honor of Hendryx Woodrow "Woody" Johansen (1913–1991). Johansen was a professor of civil engineering at the University of Alaska Fairbanks, and an employee of the Alaska Road Commission and the Alaska Department of Highways. As northern district engineer for the Department of Highways, he envisioned and designed the system of expressways which was built in the Fairbanks area between the 1970s and 1990s.

== Route description ==
The Johansen Expressway is a four- to six-lane expressway in Fairbanks. Most of the expressway is built with four lanes of traffic and the capability to upgrade to six lanes. The expressway begins as a continuation of Geist Road at an intersection with University Avenue near the University of Alaska Fairbanks campus. From this point it continues east as a four-lane expressway, passing through an interchange with Peger Road, providing access to commercial districts along Airport Way to the south. Johansen Expressway continues east, passing through an intersection with Danby Street, a major connection to residential areas to the north, and through a major interchange with College Road, providing a connection with Downtown Fairbanks and other outlying commercial and residential districts. After passing through two intersections leading to commercial developments, the Johansen Expressway ends at the Steese Highway, an old gold-rush route that leads to the town of Circle to the north.

== Exit list ==
The entire route is in Fairbanks North Star Borough.

Location	mi	km	Exit	Destinations	Notes
College	0.0	0.0		University Avenue / Geist Road west	At-grade intersection; Continuation west as Geist Road
Fairbanks	0.6	0.97	2	Peger Road	
Fairbanks	1.7	2.7	3A	Aurora Drive / Hanson Road	Westbound exit only
Fairbanks	1.8	2.9	3B	Danby Street / Depot Road— Alaska Railroad	At-grade intersection; Signed as exit 3B westbound
Fairbanks	2.7	4.3	4	College Road	
Fairbanks	3.6	5.8		Hunter Street	At-grade intersection
Fairbanks	3.8	6.1		Old Steese Highway	At-grade intersection
Fairbanks	4.2	6.8		AK-2 (Steese Expressway) / City Lights Boulevard east – Fox, North Pole	Eastern terminus of freeway; Continuation east as City Lights Boulevard
1.000 mi = 1.609 km; 1.000 km = 0.621 mi: Incomplete access
