= Alaska Route 2 =

Highway in Alaska, United States

Alaska Route 2
- Richardson Highway; Alaska Highway
- Route 2 highlighted in red

Route information
- Maintained by Alaska DOT&PF
- Length: 456.91 mi (735.33 km)
- Component highways: (1) Alaska Highway between Alcan Border and Delta Junction; (2) Richardson Highway between Delta Junction and Fairbanks; (3) Steese Highway in Fairbanks; (4) Elliott Highway between Fairbanks and Manley Hot Springs; (5) Manley Hot Springs Road from Manley Hot Springs to the Tanana River

Major junctions
- West end: Tanana River in Manley Hot Springs
- AK-11 (Dalton Highway) at Livengood; AK-6 (Steese Highway) in Fox; AK-3 (George Parks Highway) in Fairbanks; AK-4 (Richardson Highway) in Delta Junction; AK-1 (Tok Cut-Off Hwy) at Tok
- East end: Hwy 1 (Alaska Highway) at the Canadian border in Alcan Border

Location
- Country: United States
- State: Alaska
- Boroughs: Unorganized, Fairbanks North Star

Highway system
- Alaska Routes; Interstate; Scenic Byways
← AK-1	→ AK-3

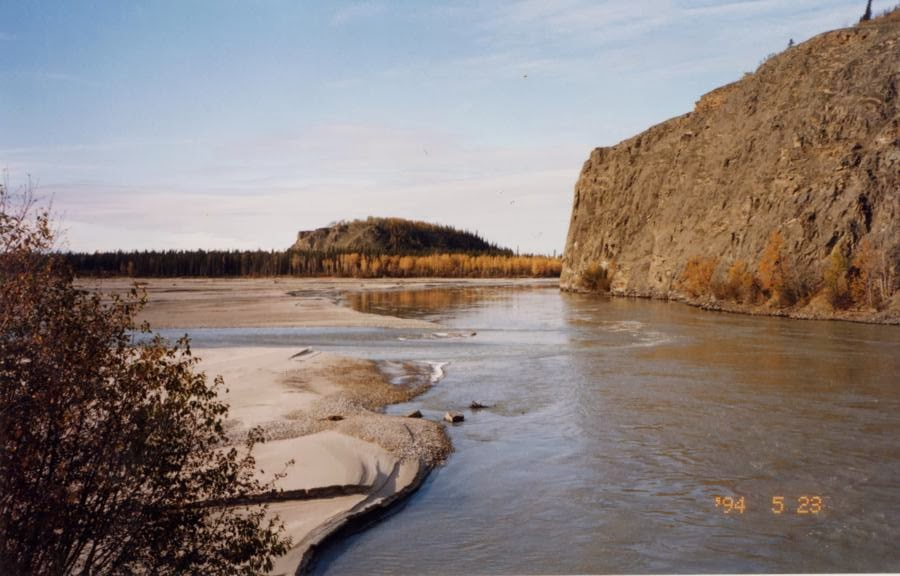
Route 2, Delta Junction

Alaska Route 2 is a state highway in the central and east-central portions of the U.S. state of Alaska. It runs from Manley Hot Springs to the Canada–United States border, passing through Fairbanks and Delta Junction. Alaska Route 2 includes the entire length of the Alaska Highway in the state, the remainder of the highway being in the Yukon Territory and British Columbia, Canada.

== Route description ==
Route 2 begins at a dead end near the Tanana River at Manley Hot Springs, where the Elliott Highway begins. Until the junction with the Dalton Highway (Alaska Route 11) at Livengood, Route 2 is a minor road used only for local access; beyond Livengood it carries traffic to and from the Dalton Highway. At the junction with Alaska Route 6 (Steese Highway) at Fox, the Elliott Highway ends and Route 2 follows the Steese Highway south into Fairbanks. The Steese Highway becomes the Richardson Highway at Airport Way, the former route of the Parks Highway (Alaska Route 3). The Parks Highway junction is now about a mile south along the Richardson Highway, which then leaves Fairbanks to the southeast. In Delta Junction, at the northwest end of the Alaska Highway, Route 2 leaves the Richardson Highway for the Alaska Highway, while the Richardson Highway continues south as Alaska Route 4. After passing the ends of the Tok Cut-Off Highway (Alaska Route 1) at Tok and the Taylor Highway (Alaska Route 5) just beyond, Route 2 becomes Yukon Highway 1 at the Canada–United States border.

== History ==
=== Proposed U.S. Route 97 designation ===
U.S. Route 97
- Location: Canada–Fairbanks
- Existed: yes
- History: Proposed, but never designated

The Alaska Highway portion of Route 2 was once proposed to be part of the U.S. Highway System, to be signed as part of U.S. Route 97. This proposal was initiated after British Columbia renumbered a series of highways to British Columbia Highway 97 between the Canada–United States border at U.S. 97's northern terminus south of Osoyoos, and the border with the Yukon territory south of Watson Lake. The proposal was withdrawn after the Yukon declined to also renumber its portion of the Alaska Highway to "97", which would have then formed a continuous "Route 97" designation from the contiguous U.S. (specifically, from Weed, California) through Canada to Alaska.

== Major intersections ==
Borough	Location	mi	km	Destinations	Notes
Unorganized	Manley Hot Springs	0.00	0.00	Dead end	In Manley Hot Springs, Tofty Road branches off from the highway and travels about 49 miles (79 km) northwest, before terminating just across the Yukon River from Tanana. Cars can be ferried across, or driven across in the winter.
Unorganized	Livengood	85.69	137.90	AK-11 north (Dalton Highway)	Southern terminus of Alaska Route 11 / Dalton Highway
Fairbanks North Star	Fox	153.86	247.61	AK-6 east (Steese Highway)	Western terminus of Alaska Route 6; Route 2 takes on the Steese Highway name
Fairbanks North Star	160.06	257.59	Chena Hot Springs Road – Steele Creek	Interchange	
Fairbanks North Star	162.16	260.97	Farmers Loop Road		
Fairbanks North Star	Fairbanks	162.94	262.23	Johansen Expressway west	Eastern terminus of the Johansen Expressway
Fairbanks North Star	Fairbanks	164.96	265.48	Airport Way west	Eastern terminus of Airport Way
Fairbanks North Star	Fairbanks	165.75	266.75	South Cushman Street	Interchange; westbound exit and eastbound entrance
Fairbanks North Star	Fairbanks	165.97	267.10	AK-3 south (Parks Highway) – Nenana, Denali Park	Interchange
Fairbanks North Star	Fairbanks	167.28	269.21	Lakeview Drive, Old Richardson Highway – Cushman Business Area	Interchange with at-grade intersection eastbound; no westbound entrance
Fairbanks North Star	Fairbanks	169.93	273.48	Badger Road	Interchange
Fairbanks North Star	North Pole	175.80	282.92	Old Richardson Highway	Interchange
Fairbanks North Star	North Pole	177.50	285.66	Badger Road, Santa Claus Lane	Interchange
Fairbanks North Star	North Pole	178.30	286.95	5th Avenue, Mission Road	Interchange
Fairbanks North Star	North Pole	179.20	288.39	Buzby Road / Dawson Road	Interchange
Fairbanks North Star	North Pole	180.20	290.00	Laurance Road	Interchange
Fairbanks North Star	Moose Creek	185.20	298.05	Eielson AFB	Interchange
Fairbanks North Star	Salcha	204.20	328.63	Price Drive	
Unorganized	Delta Junction	259.28	417.27	AK-4 south (Richardson Highway)	Northern terminus of Alaska Route 4; northern terminus of the Alaska Highway
Unorganized	Tok	366.91	590.48	AK-1 west (Tok Cut-Off Highway) – Glennallen, Anchorage	Northern terminus of Alaska Route 1
Unorganized	Tetlin Junction	379.36	610.52	AK-5 north (Taylor Highway)	Southern terminus of Alaska Route 5
Unorganized	International border	456.91	735.33	Hwy 1 east (Alaska Highway)	Continuation into Yukon
1.000 mi = 1.609 km; 1.000 km = 0.621 mi: Incomplete access

== Future ==
A 500-mile (800 km) road reaching Nome in western Alaska has been proposed at various times. Such a road had been suggested as early as 1957 as an extension of U.S. Route 97. From 2009 onward, there has been a more intense political debate. A detailed cost investigation was funded by the state government, which in 2010 gave an estimated cost of $2.3 to $2.7 billion, or approximately $5 million per mile. This price tag was higher than previously assumed and caused hesitation about the project. A 35-mile (56 km) extension to Tanana opened in September 2016, although it has been defined as a local road, not Route 2, allowing a cost reduced more simple road. As of August 2015, no decisions have been made to start construction of additional sections.
