= Nome–Teller Highway =

Highway in Alaska

Bob Blodgett Nome–Teller Memorial Highway
- Nome–Teller Highway highlighted in red

Route information
- Maintained by Alaska DOT&PF
- Length: 72 mi (116 km)

Major junctions
- From: Nome
- To: Teller

Location
- Country: United States
- State: Alaska

Highway system
- Alaska Routes; Interstate; Scenic Byways

The Bob Blodgett Nome–Teller Memorial Highway, also known as the Nome–Teller Highway and generally referred to as simply the Teller Highway, is a well-maintained gravel road in the U.S. state of Alaska. It runs 72 miles northwest from Nome to the Inupiat village of Teller, located at the base of the sand spit that divides Port Clarence from Grantley Harbor.

Traversing rolling upland tundra meadows with many creek and river crossings, the road skirts the western flank of the rugged, glacier-carved Kigluaik Mountains. The road leads through some of the country's earliest gold mining areas and ends at the only native village on the summer road system.

The road was named in honor of Robert R. "Bob" Blodgett, a Teller businessman and politician. Nicknamed "The Heller from Teller" in the halls of the state capitol, Blodgett served as a Democratic member of the state house and senate during Alaska's early years as a state.

== Junctions ==
The entire route is in Unorganized Borough.

Location	mi	km	Destinations	Notes
Nome	0.0	0.0	Front Street to Nome–Council Highway	Southern terminus
Teller	72	116	Front Street	Northern terminus
1.000 mi = 1.609 km; 1.000 km = 0.621 mi
