= Steese Highway =

Highway in Alaska

Steese Highway
- Alaska Route 6 Alaska Route 2
- Steese Highway highlighted in red

Route information
- Length: 161 mi (259 km)
- Existed: Late 1890s–present

Major junctions
- South end: AK-2 (Richardson Highway) / Airport Way in Fairbanks
- AK-2 (Elliot Highway) in Fox
- North end: River Street in Circle

Location
- Country: United States
- State: Alaska
- Counties: Fairbanks North Star, Unorganized

Highway system
- Alaska Routes; Interstate; Scenic Byways
← AK-5	AK-6	→ AK-7

The Steese Highway (known as the Steese Expressway within Fairbanks) is a highway in the Interior region of the U.S. state of Alaska that extends 161 miles (259 km) from Fairbanks to Circle, a town on the Yukon River about 50 miles (80 km) south of the Arctic Circle. The highway was completed in 1927 and is named for U.S. Army General James G. Steese, a former president of the Alaska Road Commission. It is paved for about the first 81 miles (130 km) and around the town of Central it turns to dirt and gravel. Much of it is narrow and winding.

== History ==
The highway and surrounding region has a long association with gold mining. It was built to service the Circle Mining District, which was very productive in the 1890s, before the discovery of gold in the Klondike. Both historic sites, such as Felix Pedro's 1902 gold discovery which resulted in the founding of Fairbanks, and the preserved gold camp at Chatanika, and active dredging operations line the road.

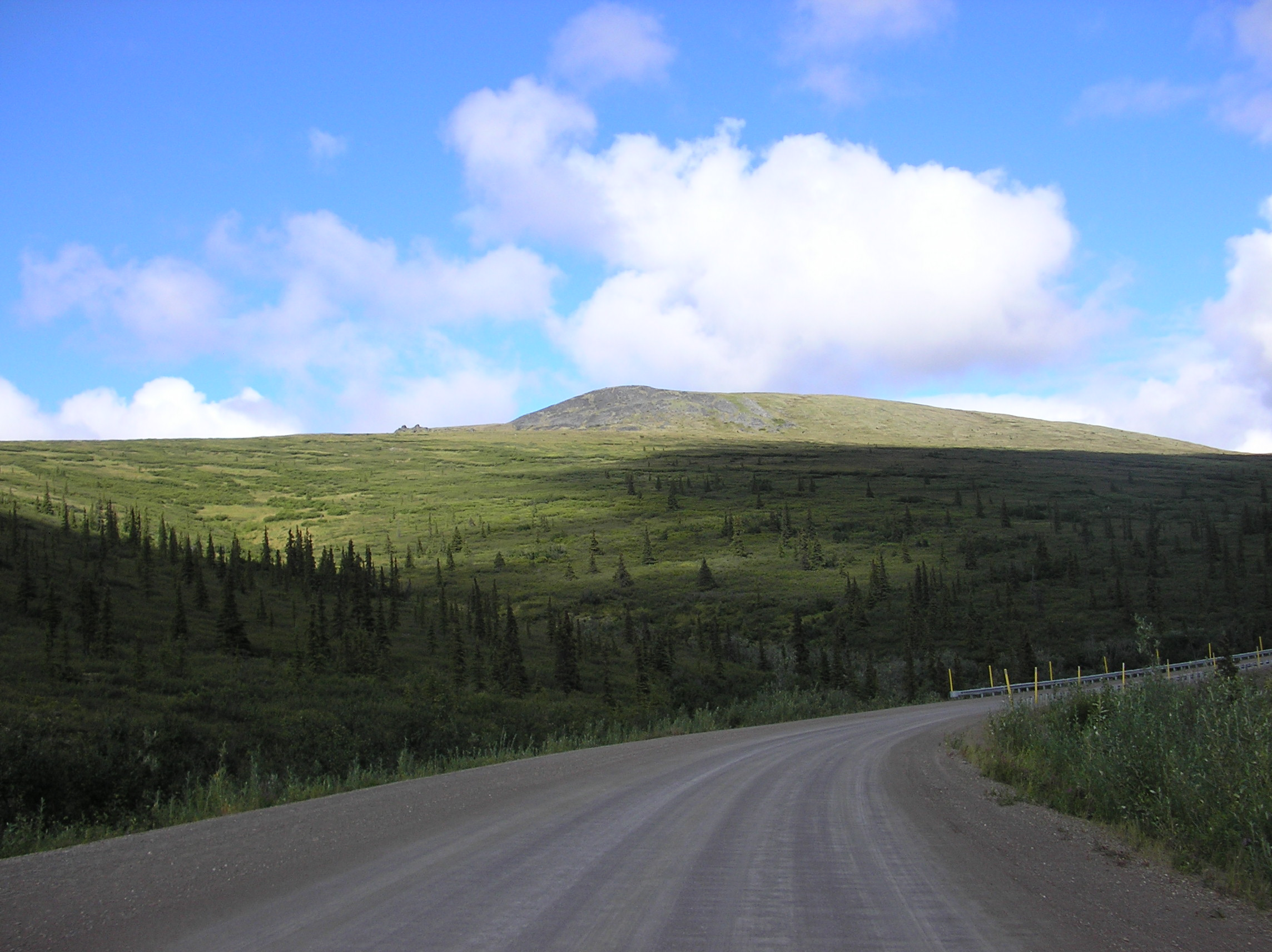
Much of the highway passes through rugged unpopulated areas.

== Route description ==
The Steese Highway is numbered Alaska Route 6 for most of its length, except for the first 11 miles (17 km) from Fairbanks to Fox, which are numbered Alaska Route 2. The highway has been designated as a National Scenic Byway.

There are three possible road closure barriers, so 511 Alaska should be checked before traveling its length to Circle Alaska.

== Major Intersections ==
Borough	Location	mi	km	Destinations	Notes
Fairbanks North Star	Fairbanks	0	0.0	AK-2 east (Richardson Highway) / Airport Way west	Southern terminus of Stesse Highway
Fairbanks North Star	Fairbanks			Crossing over the Chena River	
Fairbanks North Star	Fairbanks			Johansen Expressway west	Eastern terminus of Johansen Expressway
Fairbanks North Star			Farmers Loop Road		
Fairbanks North Star			Chena Hot Springs Road – Steele Creek	Interchange	
Fairbanks North Star	Fox	11	18	AK-2 north (Elliot Highway) / AK-6 begins (Old Steese Highway)	Alaska Route 2 continues north as the Elliot Highway and south as the remainder of the Steese Highway
Fairbanks North Star	Chatanika	28	45	Old Chatanika Highway	
Unorganized	Central	128	206	Circle Hot Springs Road	
Unorganized	Circle			Road to Circle City Airport	
Unorganized	Circle	161	259	River Road	Northern terminus of Alaska Route 6 and the Steese Highway
1.000 mi = 1.609 km; 1.000 km = 0.621 mi: Concurrency terminus; Incomplete access; Route transition
