= Zimovia Highway =

Highway in Alaska, United States

- Zimovia Highway highlighted in red

Route information
- Length: 14 mi (23 km)

Major junctions
- North end: Wrangell
- South end: McCormick Creek Road

Location
- Country: United States
- State: Alaska
- Boroughs: Wrangell

Highway system
- Alaska Routes; Interstate; Scenic Byways

The Zimovia Highway is a 14-mile-long (23 km) highway located in Wrangell, Alaska, United States.

== Major intersections ==
The entire route is in Wrangell Borough.

Location	mi	km	Destinations	Notes
	0.00	0.00	McCormick Creek Road	Southern terminus
Wrangell	14	23	Church Street	Northern terminus
1.000 mi = 1.609 km; 1.000 km = 0.621 mi

== History ==
On November 20, 2023, a landslide buried homes and a portion of the highway in a remote area south of Wrangell proper, killing two adults and a girl and leaving an adult and two children missing. The slide was 450 feet (137.2 m) wide when it crossed the highway. About 20 people were rescued from the area.
