= Discovery Claim on Pedro Creek =

Archaeological site in Alaska, United States

- U.S. National Register of Historic Places
- Alaska Heritage Resources Survey
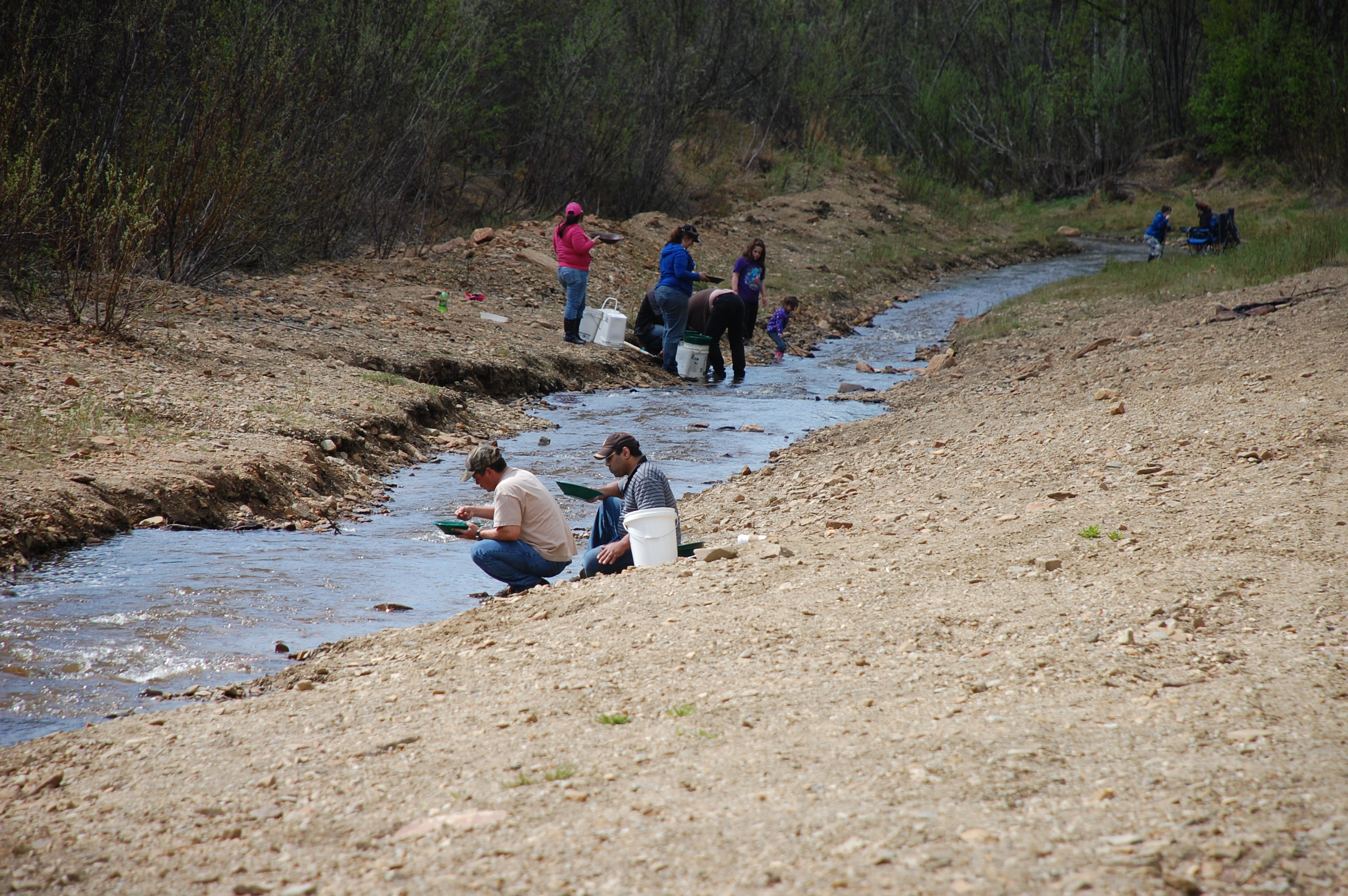
- Prospecting on Pedro Creek

- Location within Alaska
- Location: Mile 16.5 Steese Highway
- Nearest city: Fairbanks, Alaska
- Coordinates: 65°0′32″N 147°29′51″W
- Area: 19.3 acres (7.8 ha)
- Built: 1902
- NRHP reference No.: 92000498
- AHRS No.: LIV-178
- Added to NRHP: May 13, 1992

The Discovery Claim on Pedro Creek is a historic gold mining site in central Alaska. It is located at mile 16.5 of the Steese Highway, northeast of Fairbanks. It is a 19-acre (7.7 ha) site on what is now called Pedro Creek, that was where Felix Pedro made the first major discovery of gold in the area on July 22, 1902. His discovery drew large numbers of gold prospectors to the area, and led to the establishment of Fairbanks as a major community in Alaska. Most of the claim site is located south of the highway, which crosses one corner. There is a commemorative marker placed at the side of the highway in 1952. The claim is now owned by the Pioneers of Alaska Igloo #4; there is no substantial evidence of the mining activities that took place there.

The site was listed on the National Register of Historic Places in 1992.

== See also ==
- National Register of Historic Places listings in Fairbanks North Star Borough, Alaska
