= Glenn Highway =

Highway in Alaska, United States

Glenn Highway
- Glenn Highway highlighted in red

Route information
- Length: 179 mi (288 km)
- Tourist routes: Glenn Highway

Major junctions
- West end: AK-1 (East 5th & 6th Avenues) Anchorage near Merrill Field
- East end: AK-1 / AK-4 (Richardson Highway) in Glennallen

Location
- Country: United States
- State: Alaska

Highway system
- Alaska Routes; Interstate; Scenic Byways

The Glenn Highway (part of Alaska Route 1) is a highway in the U.S. state of Alaska, extending 179 miles (288 km) from Anchorage near Merrill Field to Glennallen on the Richardson Highway. The Tok Cut-Off is often considered part of the Glenn Highway, for a total length of 328 miles (528 km).

== Route description ==
The longest stretch of freeway in Alaska runs mostly along the Glenn Highway, beginning in north Anchorage, continuing onto the Parks Highway at the interchange of the two roads, and ending in the city limits of Wasilla, for a total of approximately 38 miles (61 km). This 38-mile (61 km) portion of the Glenn Highway is the only road access to Anchorage for most of the state (with the exception of the Kenai Peninsula on the Seward Highway), and as such is the main traffic corridor for Anchorage's suburbs in the Chugiak-Eagle River and Mat-Su areas. The highest point on the highway is 3,332 feet (1,016 m) at Eureka Summit, which sits on the divide between the Chugach and Talkeetna mountain ranges.

== History ==
The highway originated as the Palmer Road in the 1930s, to reach the agricultural colony at Palmer. During World War II it was completed to Glennallen as part of a massive program of military road and base building that also resulted in the Alaska Highway, and connected Anchorage to the continental highway system.

It is named for Captain Edwin Glenn (1857–1926), leader of an 1898 U.S. Army expedition to find an Alaska route to the Klondike gold fields (the eventual Richardson Highway). The highway was paved in the 1950s.

=== Paleontology ===
The "Talkeetna Mountains Hadrosaur" specimen was discovered in 1994 in a quarry being excavated for road material. That fall, excavation began, and was resumed in the summer of 1996. The quarry is near the Glenn Highway, approximately 150 miles northeast of Anchorage. This specimen was the first associated skeleton of an individual dinosaur discovered in all of Alaska.

== Interstate Highway System ==
Interstate A-1
- Location: Palmer to Fairbanks
- Length: 323.69 mi (520.93 km)
- Existed: 1976–present

Glenn Highway is part of the unsigned part of the Interstate Highway System as Interstate A-1.

== Major intersections ==
County	Location	mi	km	Destinations	Notes
Municipality of Anchorage		1.2	1.9	Airport Heights Drive	Western terminus of freeway. Roadway continues west as 5th Avenue.
Municipality of Anchorage		1.7	2.7	Bragaw Street	
Municipality of Anchorage		3.0	4.8	Boniface Parkway	
Municipality of Anchorage		3.4	5.5	Turpin Street	Eastbound exit and entrance
Municipality of Anchorage		4.2	6.8	Muldoon Road	
Municipality of Anchorage		6.1	9.8	Arctic Valley Road	Eastbound exit and westbound entrance, access to Arctic Valley
Municipality of Anchorage		7.5	12.1	D Street	
Municipality of Anchorage		11.6	18.7	Eagle River Loop Road	
Municipality of Anchorage		13.4	21.6	Artillery Road	
Municipality of Anchorage		15.5	24.9	Eklutna Park Drive	
Municipality of Anchorage		17.2	27.7	South Birchwood Loop Road	
Municipality of Anchorage		20.9	33.6	North Birchwood Loop Road	
Municipality of Anchorage		21.5	34.6	Voyles Boulevard	
Municipality of Anchorage		23.0	37.0	Lake Hill Drive	
Municipality of Anchorage		24	39	Paradis Lane	
Municipality of Anchorage		25.2	40.6	Old Glenn Highway	Eastbound entrance and exit
Municipality of Anchorage		26.5	42.6	Eklutna Village Road	
Municipality of Anchorage		29.6	47.6	Old Glenn Highway (south end)	
Matanuska-Susitna	Knik River			SFC James Bondsteel Bridge of Honor across the Knik River	
Matanuska-Susitna	Knik River	30.6	49.2	Knik River Access	
Matanuska-Susitna	Gateway	34	55	AK-3 north (George Parks Highway) – Wasilla, Fairbanks	
Matanuska-Susitna	Gateway	35.8	57.6	Northern end of freeway	
Matanuska-Susitna	Palmer	41.7	67.1	Palmer-Wasilla Highway	
Unorganized	Glennallen	179	288	AK-1 / AK-4 (Richardson Highway) – Valdez, Tok	
1.000 mi = 1.609 km; 1.000 km = 0.621 mi: Incomplete access

== Gallery ==
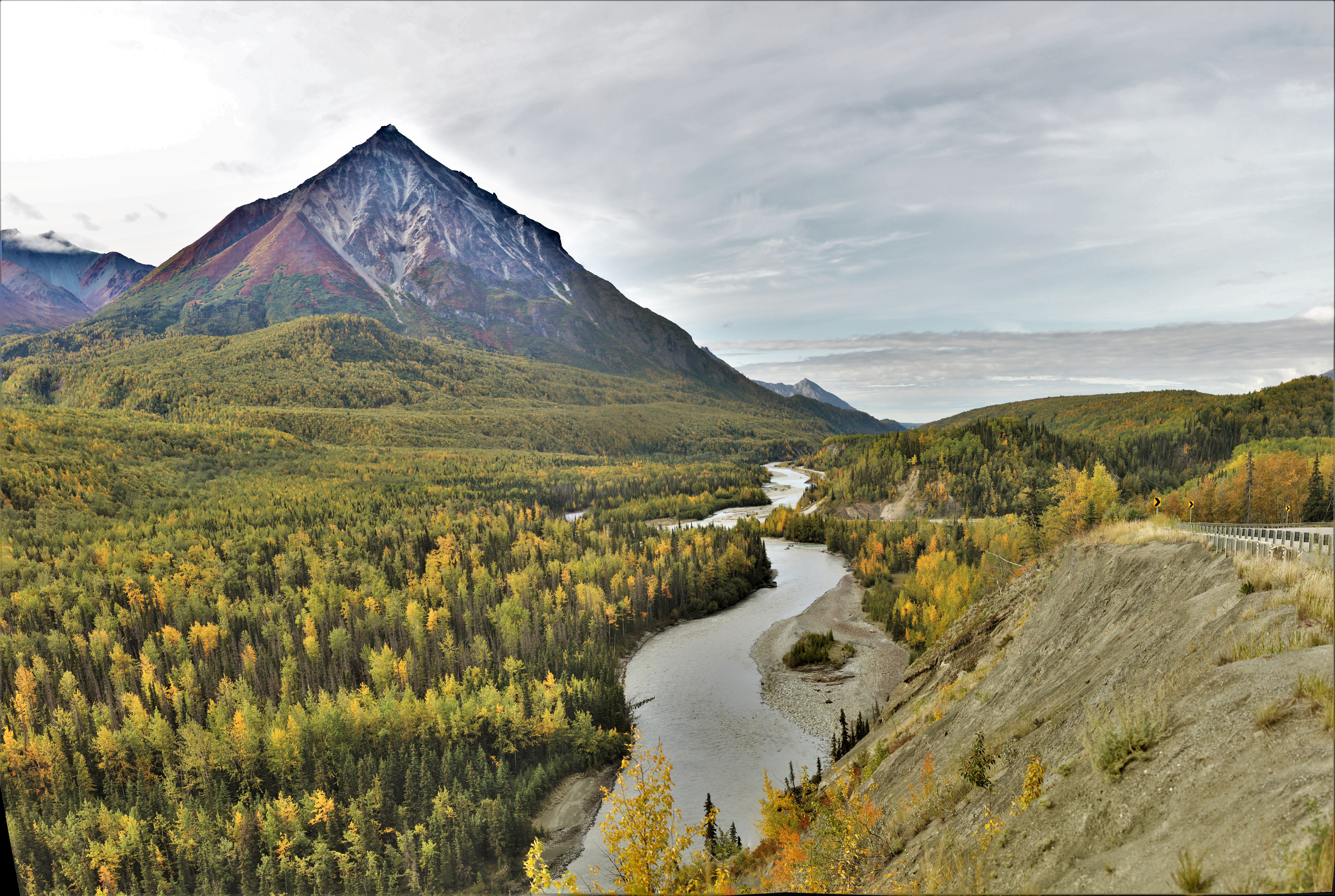
The Glenn Highway on the right side of the Matanuska River and Kings Mountain at mile 76 (km 123).

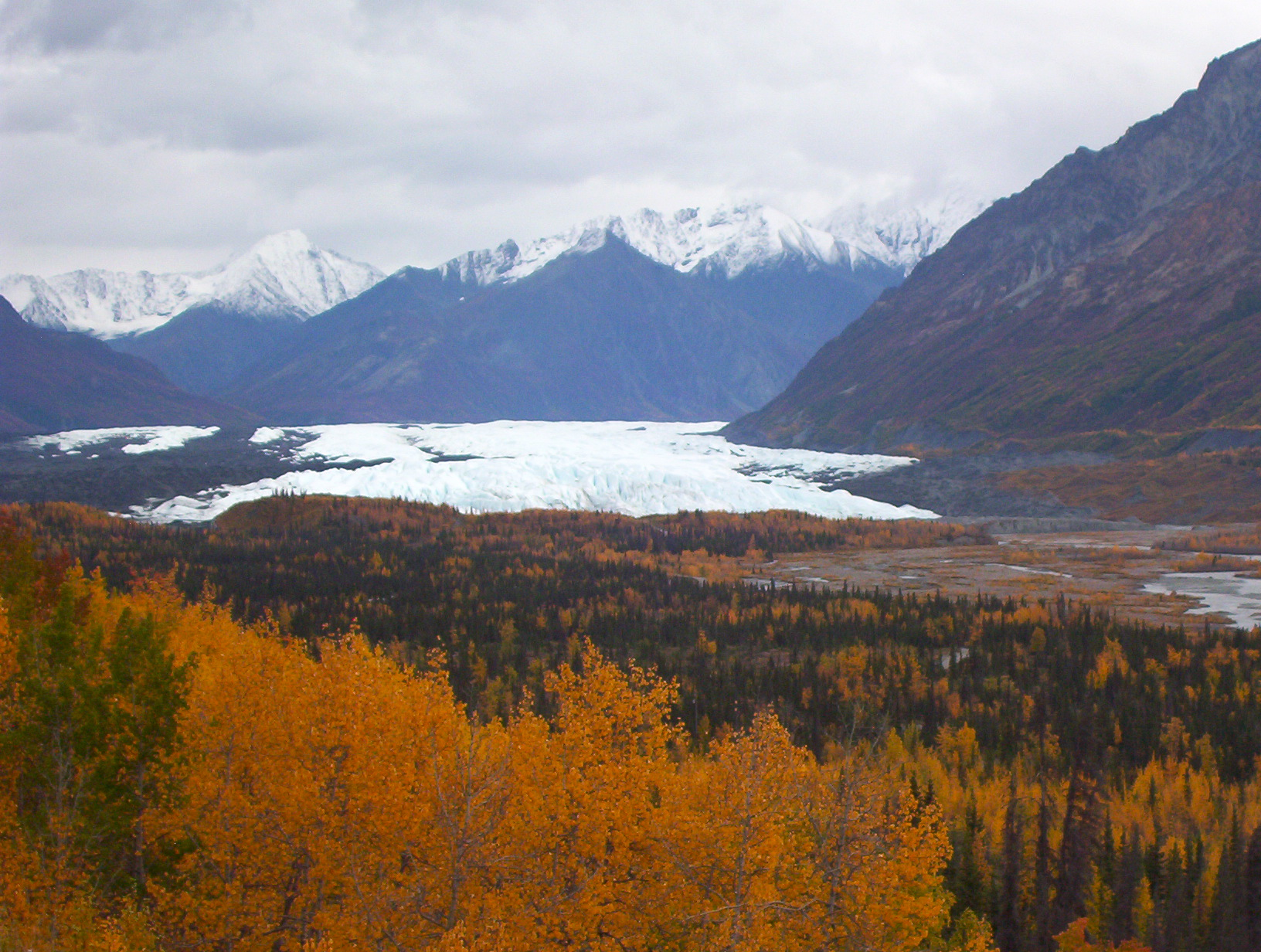
Matanuska Glacier seen from the Glenn Highway at mile 102 (km 164)

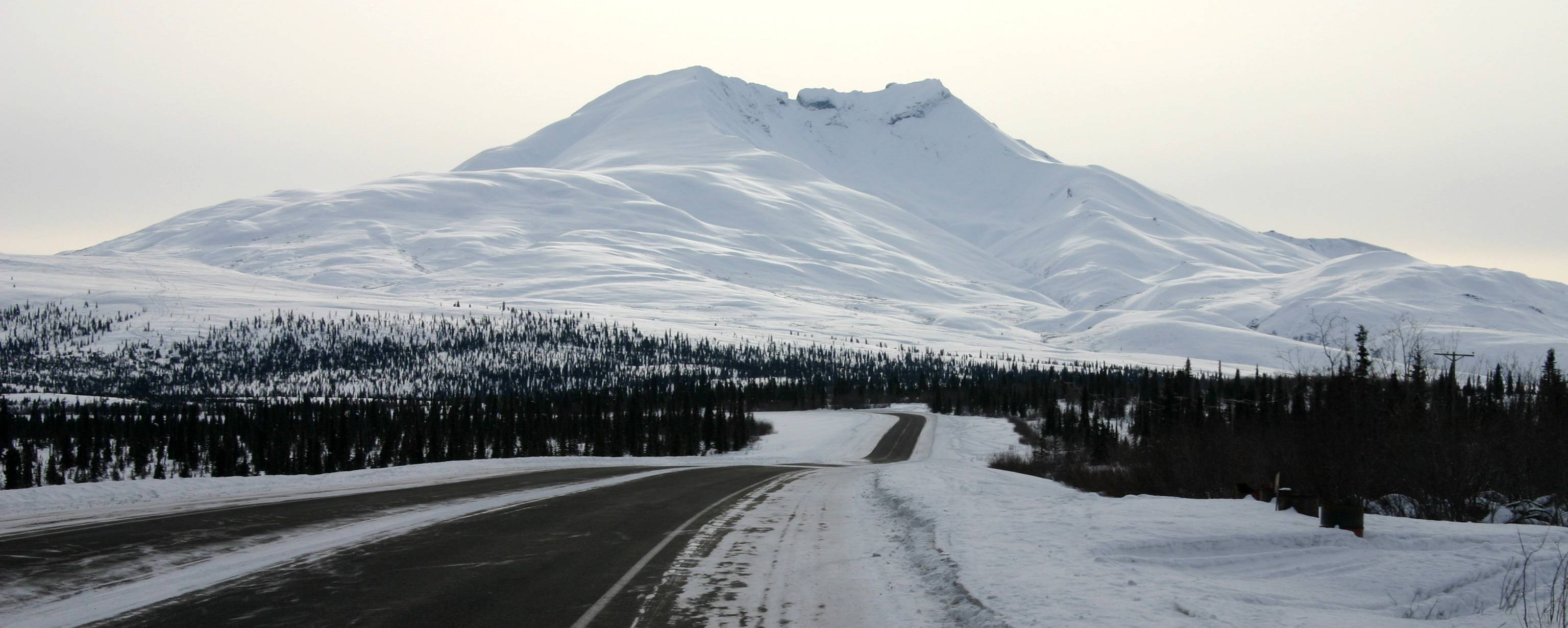
Gunsight Mountain and the Glenn Highway near mile 129 (km 208)

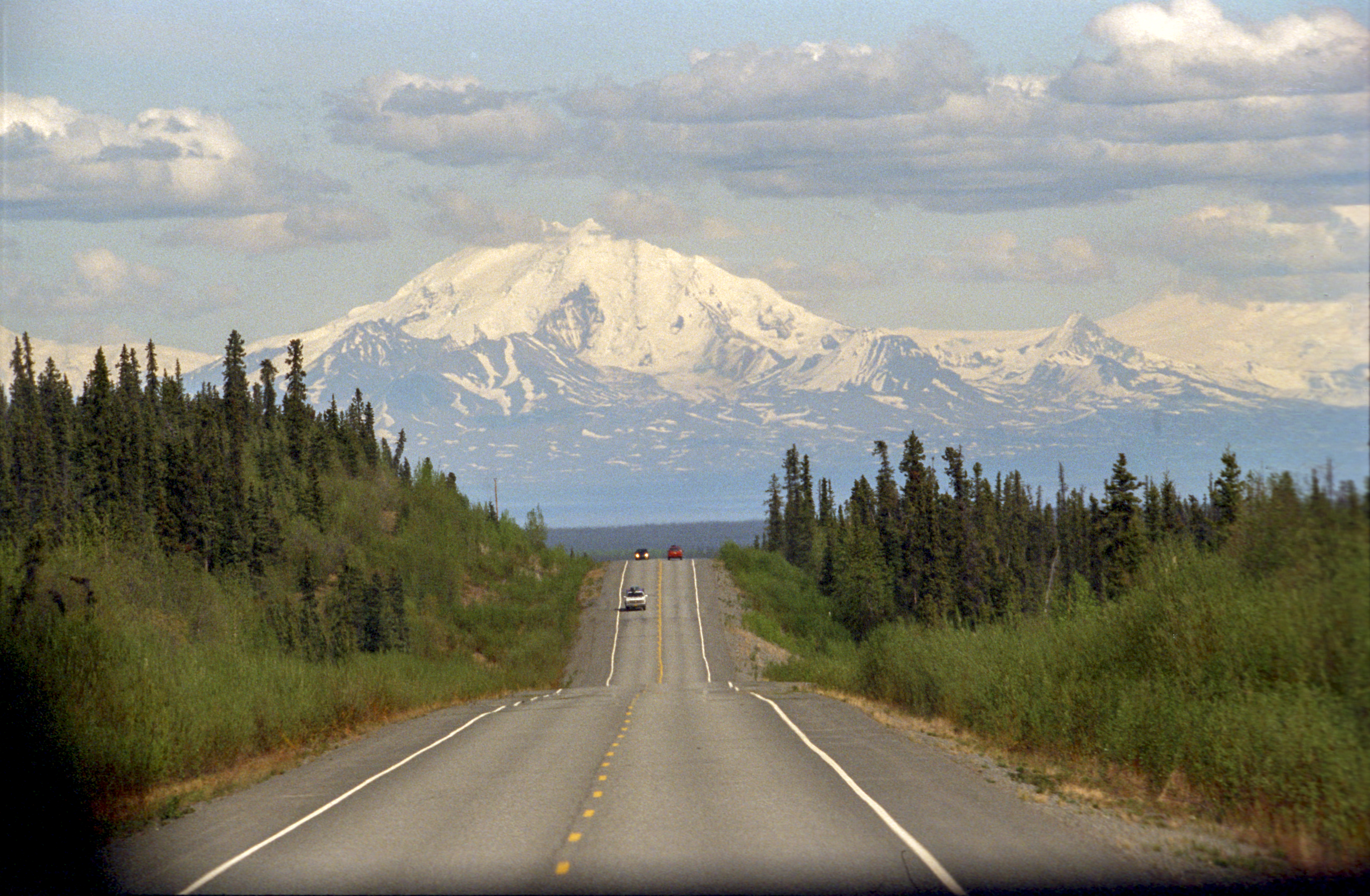
Mount Drum and the Glenn Highway near mile 170 (km 274)

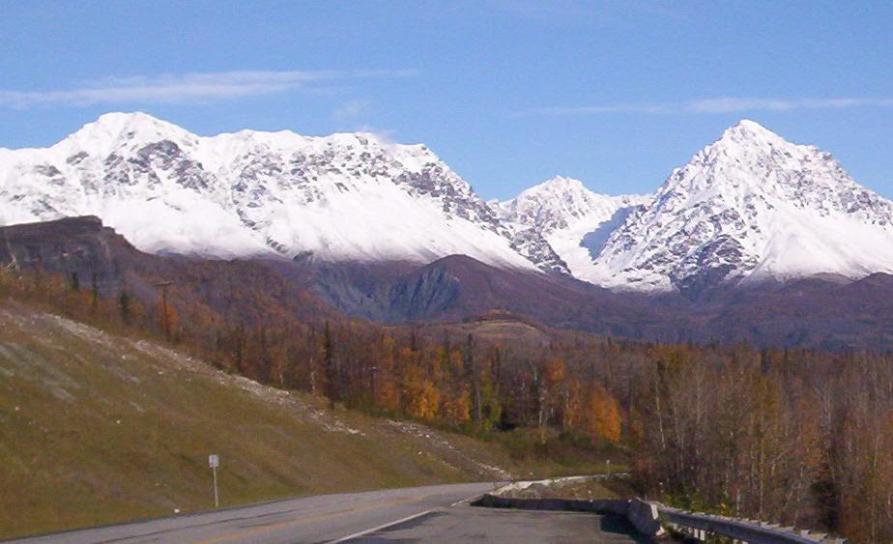
Granite Peak from Glenn Highway

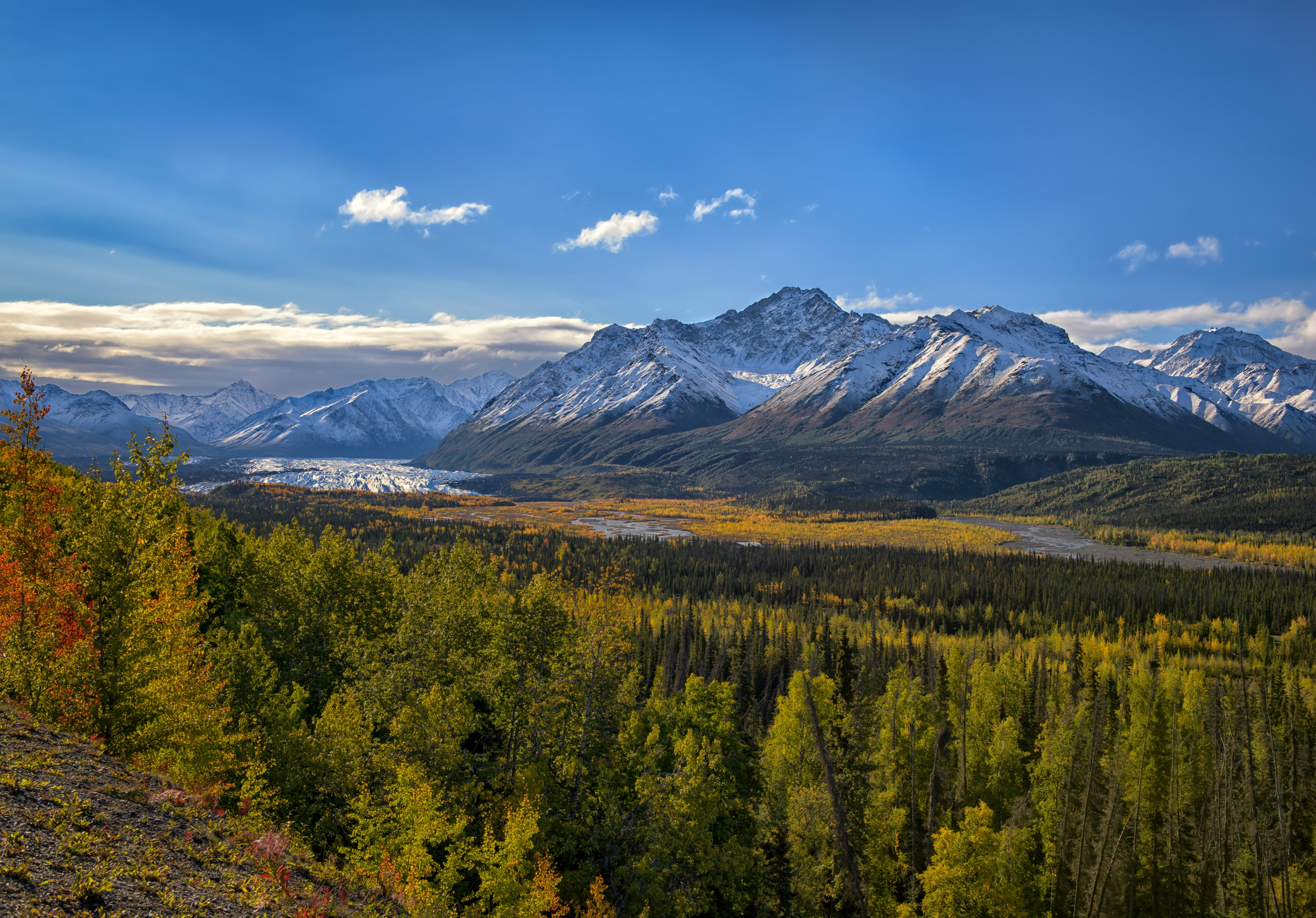
Mount Wickersham and Matanuska Glacier from mile 101 of the highway

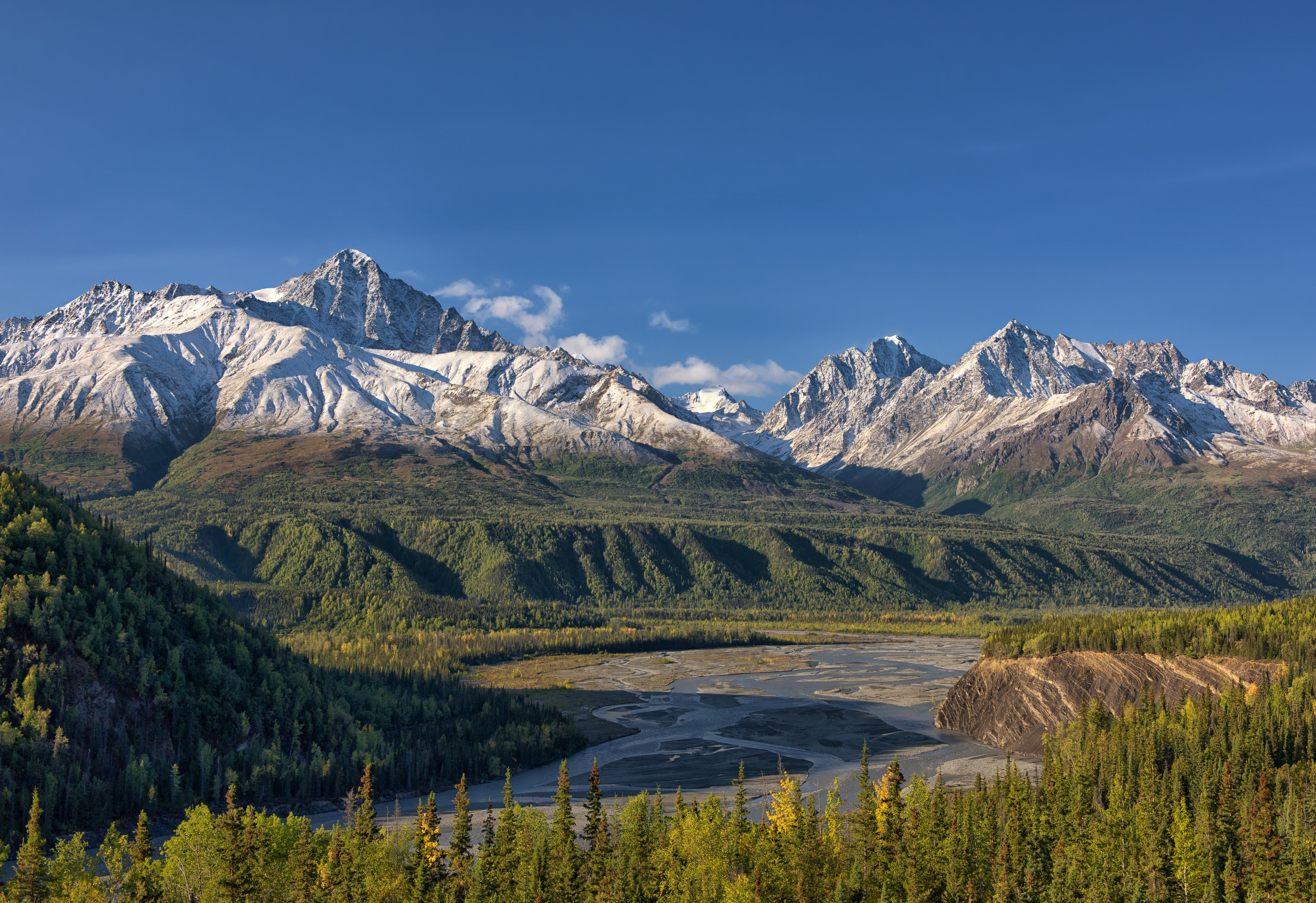
Amulet Peak and Matanuska River at Mile 94
