= Tok, Alaska =

Census-designated place in Alaska

- CDP
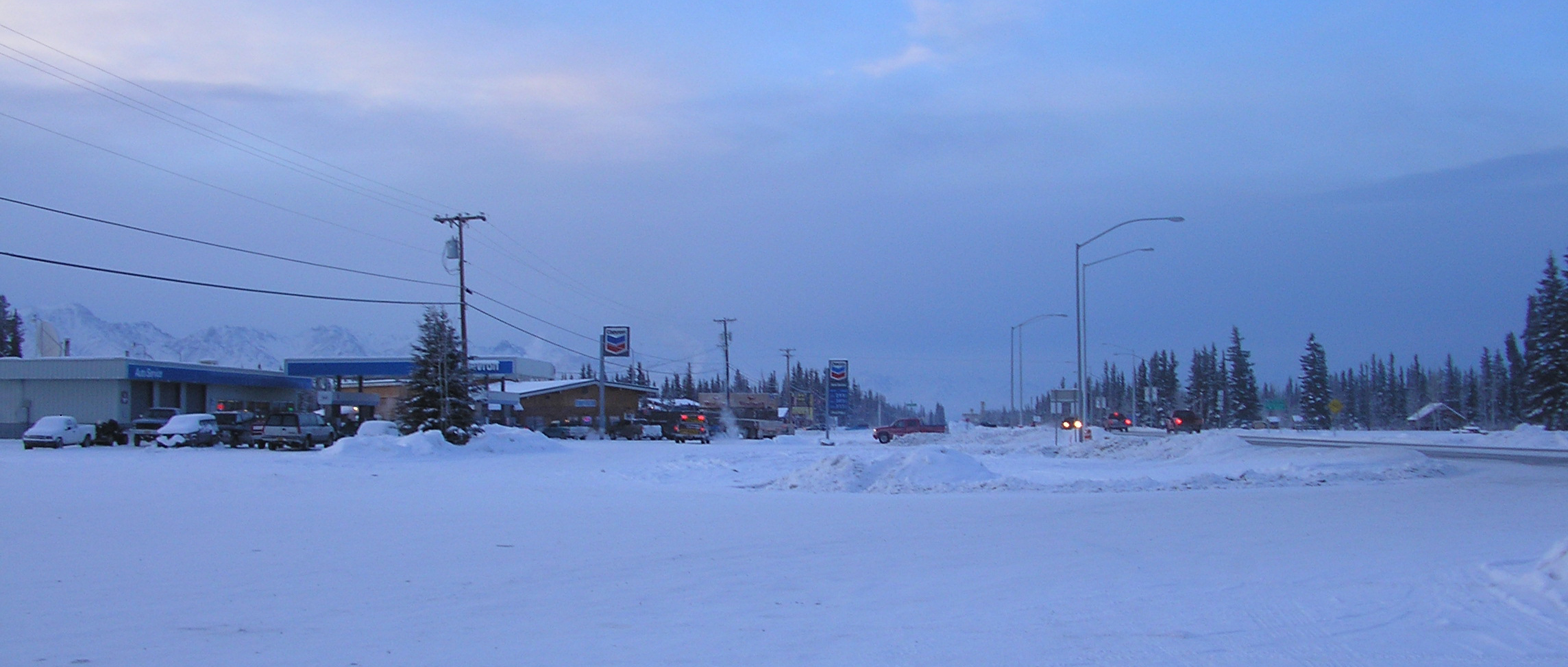

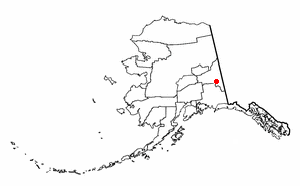
- Location of Tok, Alaska
- Coordinates: 63°19′27″N 143°1′5″W
- Country: United States
- State: Alaska
- Census Area: Southeast Fairbanks

Government
  - State senator: Click Bishop (R)
  - State rep.: Mike Cronk (R)

Area
  - Total: 133.52 sq mi (345.82 km^{2})
  - Land: 133.52 sq mi (345.82 km^{2})
  - Water: 0 sq mi (0.00 km^{2})
- Elevation: 1,620 ft (490 m)

Population (2020)
  - Total: 1,243
  - Density: 9.3/sq mi (3.59/km^{2})
- Time zone: UTC-9 (Alaska (AKST))
  - Summer (DST): UTC-8 (AKDT)
- ZIP code: 99780
- Area code: 907
- FIPS code: 02-77800

Tok (/ˈtoʊk/, TOKE) is a census-designated place (CDP) in Southeast Fairbanks Census Area, Alaska, United States. The population was 1,243 at the 2020 census, slightly down from 1,258 in 2010.

== Geography ==
Tok lies on a large, flat alluvial plain of the Tanana Valley between the Tanana River and the Alaska Range at an important junction of the Alaska Highway (Alaska Route 2) with the Glenn Highway (Alaska Route 1). According to the United States Census Bureau, the CDP has a total area of 132.3 square miles (343 km^{2}), all of it land.

=== Climate ===
Tok has a dry-winter continental subarctic climate (Köppen Dwc) with generally warm summers and severely cold winters. The weather station is at 1,620 feet or 494 metres above sea level.

Climate data for Tok, Alaska, 1991–2020 normals, extremes 1954–present
Month	Jan	Feb	Mar	Apr	May	Jun	Jul	Aug	Sep	Oct	Nov	Dec	Year
Record high °F (°C)	51 (11)	43 (6)	69 (21)	74 (23)	88 (31)	96 (36)	95 (35)	93 (34)	83 (28)	67 (19)	49 (9)	40 (4)	96 (36)
Mean maximum °F (°C)	19.3 (−7.1)	29.1 (−1.6)	43.2 (6.2)	61.2 (16.2)	74.1 (23.4)	83.9 (28.8)	85.7 (29.8)	81.2 (27.3)	68.1 (20.1)	49.8 (9.9)	25.5 (−3.6)	19.3 (−7.1)	87.4 (30.8)
Mean daily maximum °F (°C)	−3.7 (−19.8)	8.3 (−13.2)	24.1 (−4.4)	44.6 (7.0)	61.0 (16.1)	71.1 (21.7)	72.2 (22.3)	66.8 (19.3)	53.6 (12.0)	31.4 (−0.3)	8.0 (−13.3)	−2.4 (−19.1)	36.3 (2.4)
Daily mean °F (°C)	−11.9 (−24.4)	−2.5 (−19.2)	9.6 (−12.4)	31.2 (−0.4)	45.9 (7.7)	56.5 (13.6)	59.1 (15.1)	53.5 (11.9)	42.1 (5.6)	22.7 (−5.2)	0.0 (−17.8)	−10.1 (−23.4)	24.7 (−4.1)
Mean daily minimum °F (°C)	−20.0 (−28.9)	−13.2 (−25.1)	−4.9 (−20.5)	17.7 (−7.9)	30.8 (−0.7)	41.9 (5.5)	46.0 (7.8)	40.2 (4.6)	30.6 (−0.8)	14.0 (−10.0)	−7.9 (−22.2)	−17.7 (−27.6)	13.1 (−10.5)
Mean minimum °F (°C)	−48.6 (−44.8)	−41.3 (−40.7)	−30.2 (−34.6)	−7.0 (−21.7)	19.4 (−7.0)	28.3 (−2.1)	34.1 (1.2)	25.4 (−3.7)	15.6 (−9.1)	−11.4 (−24.1)	−33.3 (−36.3)	−42.3 (−41.3)	−54.5 (−48.1)
Record low °F (°C)	−71 (−57)	−67 (−55)	−57 (−49)	−33 (−36)	3 (−16)	16 (−9)	10 (−12)	13 (−11)	−13 (−25)	−41 (−41)	−59 (−51)	−70 (−57)	−71 (−57)
Average precipitation inches (mm)	0.43 (11)	0.21 (5.3)	0.20 (5.1)	0.21 (5.3)	0.87 (22)	2.37 (60)	2.29 (58)	1.32 (34)	0.95 (24)	0.55 (14)	0.62 (16)	0.58 (15)	10.60 (269)
Average snowfall inches (cm)	4.9 (12)	3.5 (8.9)	3.3 (8.4)	2.4 (6.1)	0.9 (2.3)	0.0 (0.0)	0.0 (0.0)	0.0 (0.0)	1.8 (4.6)	4.9 (12)	8.2 (21)	7.7 (20)	37.6 (95.3)
Average precipitation days (≥ 0.01 in)	2.7	2.2	2.3	1.8	4.9	9.5	10.6	8.5	6.4	4.8	4.5	4.8	63.0
Average snowy days (≥ 0.1 in)	2.8	2.5	2.0	1.4	0.4	0.0	0.0	0.0	0.9	3.9	4.4	4.9	23.2
Source: NOAA

== Demographics ==
Historical population
Census	Pop.	Note	%±
1950	104		—
1960	129		24.0%
1970	214		65.9%
1980	589		175.2%
1990	935		58.7%
2000	1,393		49.0%
2010	1,258		−9.7%
2020	1,243		−1.2%
U.S. Decennial Census

Tok first appeared on the 1950 U.S. Census as the unincorporated village of "Tok Junction." The name was shortened to Tok as of the 1960 census. It was made a census-designated place (CDP) in 1980.

=== 2020 census ===
As of the 2020 census, Tok had a population of 1,243. The median age was 44.7 years. 23.6% of residents were under the age of 18 and 20.5% of residents were 65 years of age or older. For every 100 females there were 104.8 males, and for every 100 females age 18 and over there were 106.1 males age 18 and over.

0.0% of residents lived in urban areas, while 100.0% lived in rural areas.

There were 526 households in Tok, of which 27.9% had children under the age of 18 living in them. Of all households, 45.8% were married-couple households, 26.8% were households with a male householder and no spouse or partner present, and 18.8% were households with a female householder and no spouse or partner present. About 34.6% of all households were made up of individuals and 15.8% had someone living alone who was 65 years of age or older.

There were 704 housing units, of which 25.3% were vacant. The homeowner vacancy rate was 1.0% and the rental vacancy rate was 10.0%.

Racial composition as of the 2020 census
Race	Number	Percent
White	852	68.5%
Black or African American	4	0.3%
American Indian and Alaska Native	170	13.7%
Asian	12	1.0%
Native Hawaiian and Other Pacific Islander	0	0.0%
Some other race	8	0.6%
Two or more races	197	15.8%
Hispanic or Latino (of any race)	31	2.5%

=== 2000 census ===
As of the census of 2000, there were 1,393 people, 534 households, and 372 families residing in the census designated place (CDP). The population density was 10.5 inhabitants per square mile (4.1/km^{2}). There were 748 housing units at an average density of 5.7 per square mile (2.2/km^{2}). The racial makeup of the CDP was 78.03% White, 0.14% Black or African American, 12.85% Native American, 0.43% Asian, 0.93% from other races, and 7.61% from two or more races. Hispanic or Latino of any race were 2.08% of the population.

There were 534 households, out of which 39.7% had children under the age of 18 living with them, 53.7% were married couples living together, 11.0% had a female householder with no husband present, and 30.3% were non-families. 24.7% of all households were made up of individuals, and 5.4% had someone living alone who was 65 years of age or older. The average household size was 2.61 and the average family size was 3.12.

In the CDP, the age distribution of the population shows 32.5% under the age of 18, 5.1% from 18 to 24, 29.5% from 25 to 44, 27.1% from 45 to 64, and 5.8% who were 65 years of age or older. The median age was 36 years. For every 100 females, there were 102.2 males. For every 100 females age 18 and over, there were 102.6 males.

The median income for a household in the CDP was $37,941, and the median income for a family was $49,219. Males had a median income of $45,375 versus $30,268 for females. The per capita income for the CDP was $18,521. About 9.5% of families and 10.5% of the population were below the poverty line, including 10.4% of those under age 18 and 7.7% of those age 65 or over.

== History ==
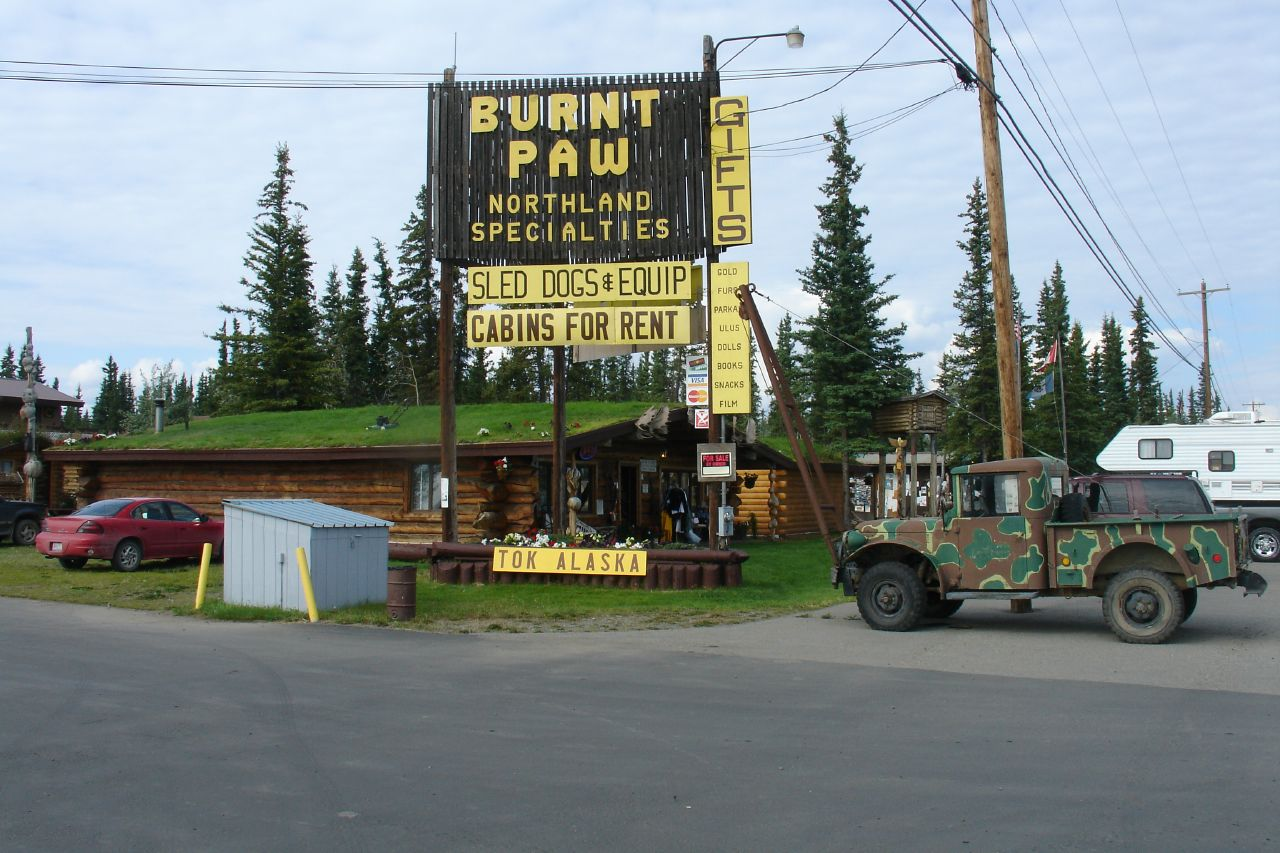
Burnt Paw in Tok

There have been Athabascan settlements in the region of what is now Tok for many centuries.

The town at the present location of Tok began in 1942 as an Alaska Road Commission camp used for construction and maintenance of the Alaska Highway. So much money was spent in the camp's construction and maintenance that it earned the nickname "Million Dollar Camp" from those working on the highway. In 1947 the first school opened, and in 1958 a larger school was built to accommodate the many newcomers. In 1995 a new school was opened to provide for the larger community. A U.S. Customs Office was located in Tok between 1947 and 1971, when it was moved to the Canada–US border.

Between 1954 and 1979, an 8-inch U.S. Army fuel pipeline operated from the port of Haines to Fairbanks, with a pump station in Tok.

In July 1990 Tok faced extinction when a lightning-caused forest fire jumped two rivers and the Alaska Highway, putting both residents and buildings in peril. The town was evacuated and even the efforts of over a thousand firefighters could not stop the fire. At the last minute a "miracle wind" (so labeled by Tok's residents) came up, diverting the fire just short of the first building. The fire continued to burn the remainder of the summer, eventually burning more than 100,000 acres (400 km^{2}).

On January 10, 2009, Tok made headlines with an unconfirmed temperature reading of −80 °F (−62 °C).

=== Etymology ===
In one version, the name Tok is derived from the Athabascan word for "peaceful crossing." The U.S. Geological Survey notes that the name "Tok River" was in use for the nearby river around 1901, and the Athabascan name of "Tokai" had been reported for the same river by Lt. Allen in 1887. In another version the name is derived from the English words "Tokyo camp", although the major war benefit was supporting the transfer of airplanes to the Soviet Union. Another version claims the name was derived from the canine mascot for one of the Engineer units that built the highways. The name has no connection to the western Alaskan community of Newtok.

Another version comes from the proposed road construction of the highway to Richardson Highway. In the 1940s and 1950s, another highway, the Tok Cut-Off was constructed and connected Tok with the Richardson Highway at Glennallen. It was a "cut-off" because it allowed motor travelers from the lower United States to travel to Valdez and Anchorage in south-central Alaska without going further north to Delta Junction and then traveling south on the Richardson Highway. When originally being surveyed from the air, the map marking showed the "T" intersection, and the letters "OK" to confirm the location was suitable.

== Education ==
Tok is part of the Alaska Gateway School District. Tok School, a K–12 campus, currently serves approximately 200 community students. There is also a small University of Alaska office that provides distance and even some local classes for the small community.

== Health care ==
Residents are primarily served by the Tok Clinic and EMS. Roads connect Tok to both Fairbanks and Anchorage (Alaska's two most populous cities), but the drive is approximately 3 hours 40 minutes or 6 hours 30 minutes, respectively. Therefore, once patients with serious medical conditions are stabilized, they are often airlifted to a hospital/medical center in Fairbanks (an approximately 1 hour 30 minute flight) if further treatment is needed.

== Economy ==
The most common occupations in Tok are in the construction, healthcare, and accommodation industries. The unemployment rate is 8%. Tok's economy is supported largely by tourism.

== Protected areas ==
There are a number of state parks in the vicinity of Tok.

The Tok River State Recreation Site is a small, 9 acres (3.6 ha) park, 4.5 miles (7.2 km) east of Tok; it has a small campground, trails, and river access for small boats. The area directly across the river from the park is part of the burned-over area still recovering from the 1990 wildfire.

The Eagle Trail State Recreation Site is a 280 acres (110 ha) park, about 15 miles (24 km) south of Tok, on the Tok Cutoff. The park has a campground and picnic areas, hiking trails, access to the historic Valdez-Eagle Trail and the high country of the Alaska Range.

The Moon Lake State Recreation Site is a small, 22 acres (8.9 ha) park off the Alaska Highway, 15 miles northwest of Tok. It has a small campground, beach, boat launch for smaller boats, and is an active landing spot for floatplanes.
