= List of Alaska Scenic Byways =

Alaska Scenic Byways
- Highway marker

System information
- Formed: 1993
- State: Alaska Route nn (AK nn)

System links
- Alaska Routes; Interstate; Scenic Byways

The Alaska Scenic Byways Program is a program designated by the Alaska Department of Transportation and Public Facilities (DOT&PF) that is used to recognize and protect the most scenic, historic, and recreational highways located in the U.S. state of Alaska. Recognized roadways may also be National Scenic Byways and National Forest Scenic Byways, both designated by the federal government, in addition to being Alaska Scenic Byways, which are designated by the state. The Alaska Scenic Byway system was created to recognize and protect Alaska's most important recreational highways.

== List ==
Name	From	To	Length (mi)	Length (km)	Highway	Notes
Alaska Marine Highway: Inside Passage Routes	Haines	Skagway	1,048	1,687	Alaska Marine Highway System	The only non-road in the National Byway System; also an All-American Road
Alaska Marine Highway: Southcentral & Cross Gulf Routes, Southwest & Aleutian Island Routes	Unalaska	Cordova	1,650	2,660	Alaska Marine Highway System	The only non-road in the National Byway System; also an All-American Road
Dalton Highway	Livengood	Deadhorse	414	666	Alaska Route 11	
Glenn Highway	Anchorage	Glennallen	139	224	Alaska Route 1	Passes a large series of scenic glaciers, also a National Scenic Byway
Haines Highway	Haines	Canada–United States border	44	71	Alaska Route 7	Travels through the scenic Chilkat Pass to the Canadian border, also a National Scenic Byway
Parks Highway	Denali State Park	Healy	116	187	Alaska Route 3	Passes through Denali National Park, also a National Scenic Byway
Richardson Highway	Fairbanks	Fort Greely	101	163	Alaska Route 2, Alaska Route 4	Northern segment
Richardson Highway	Valdez	Glenallen	115	185	Alaska Route 4	Southern segment
Seward Highway	Seward	Anchorage	127	204	Alaska Route 1	Passes directly through the scenic Chugach National Forest, also an All-American Road and a National Forest Scenic Byway
Steese Highway	Fox	Circle	151	243	Alaska Route 2, Alaska Route 6	
Sterling Highway	Seward Highway	Skilak Lake	39	63	Alaska Route 1	Northern segment
Sterling Highway	Anchor Point	Homer Spit	29	47	Alaska Route 1	Southern segment
Taylor & Top of the World Highways	Tetlin Junction	Boundary	105	169	Alaska Route 5	

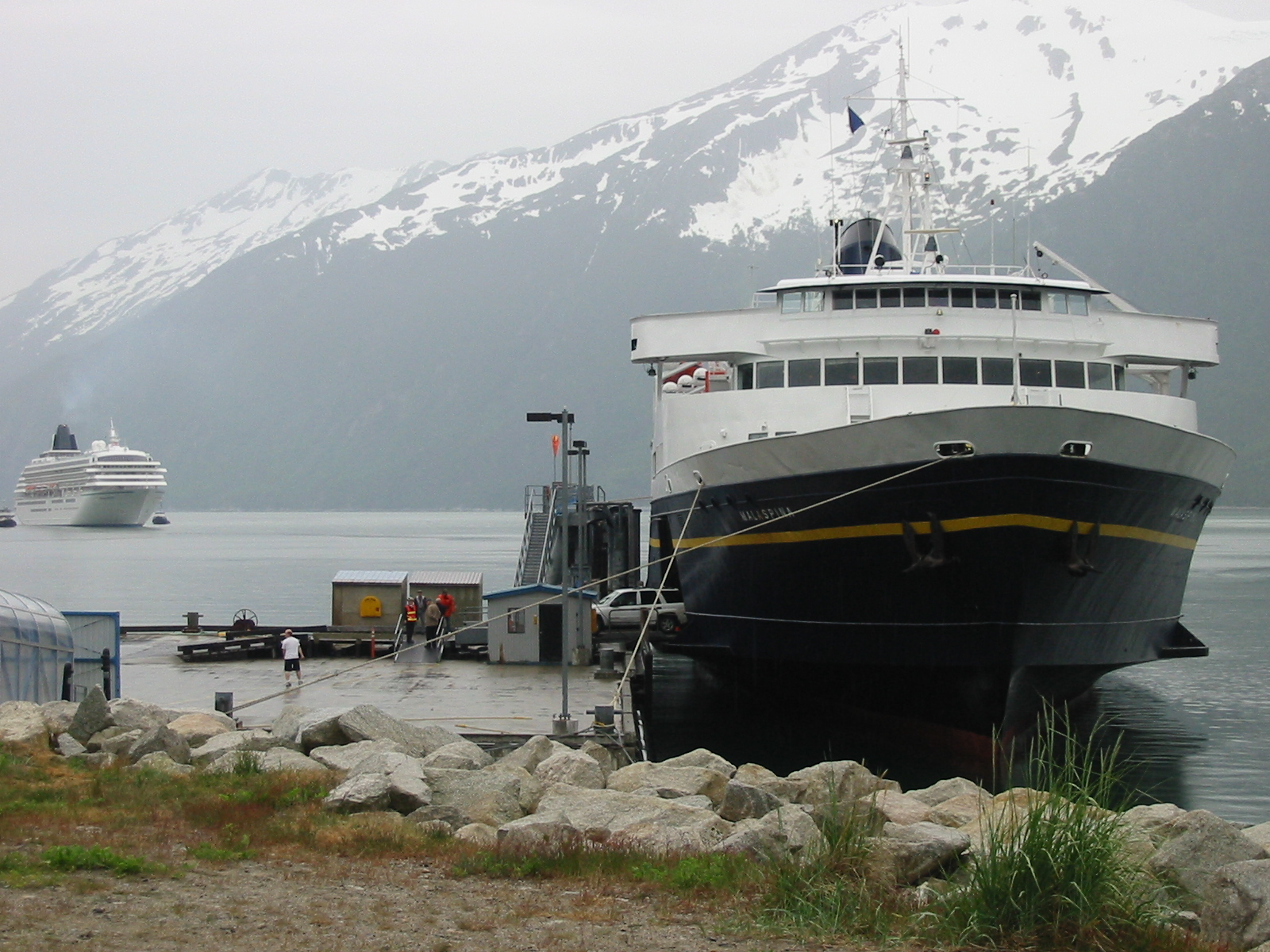

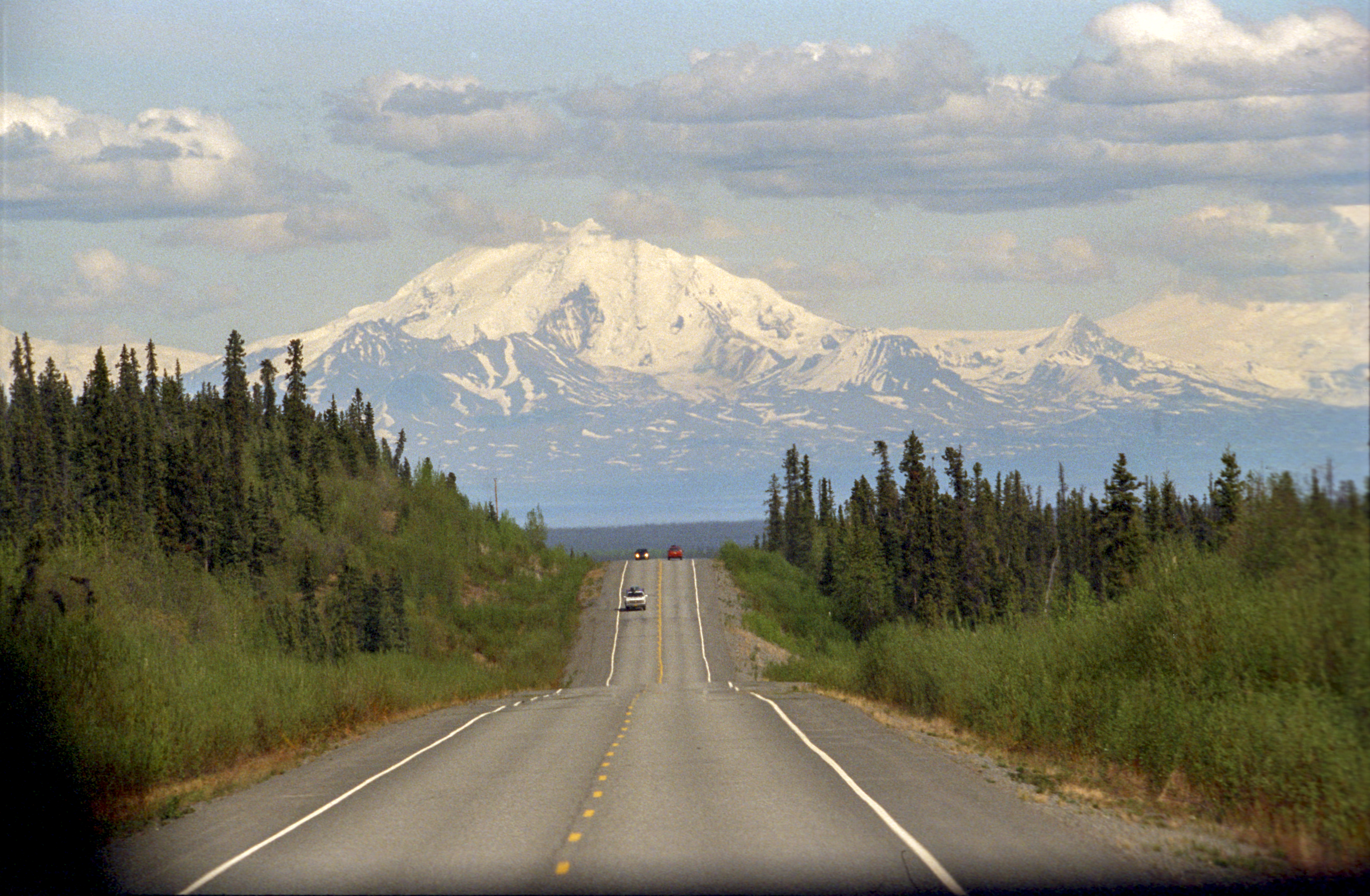

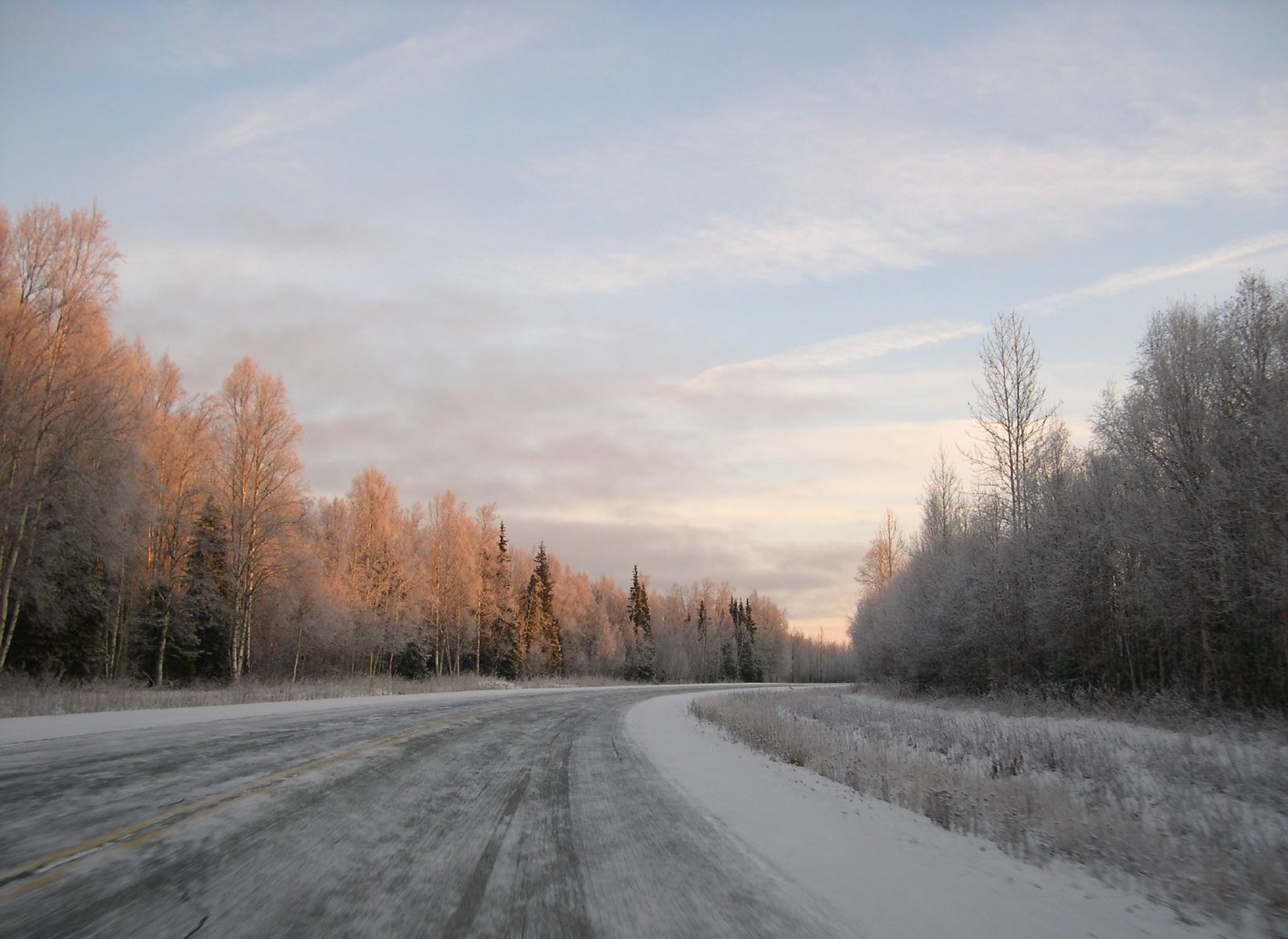

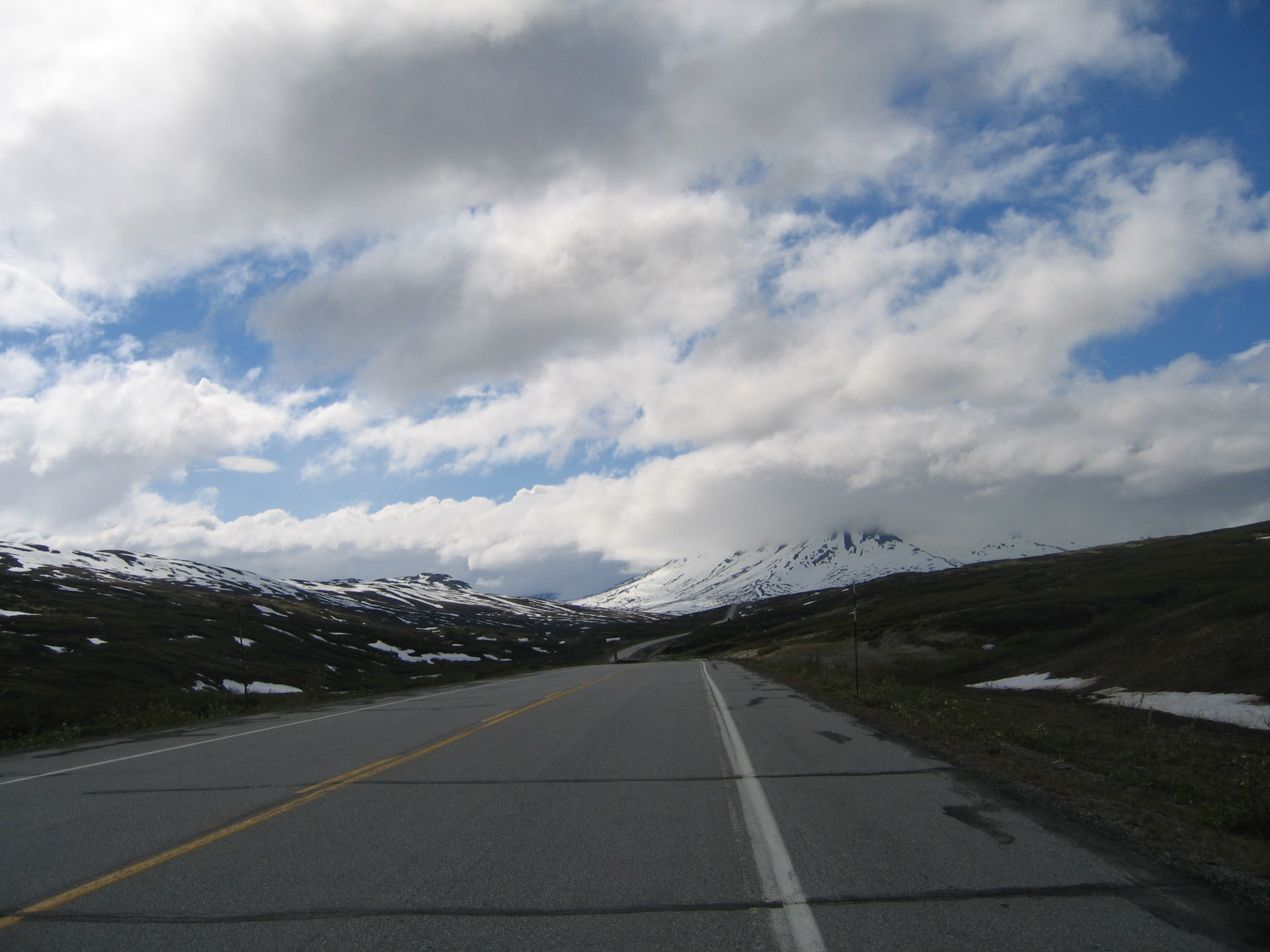

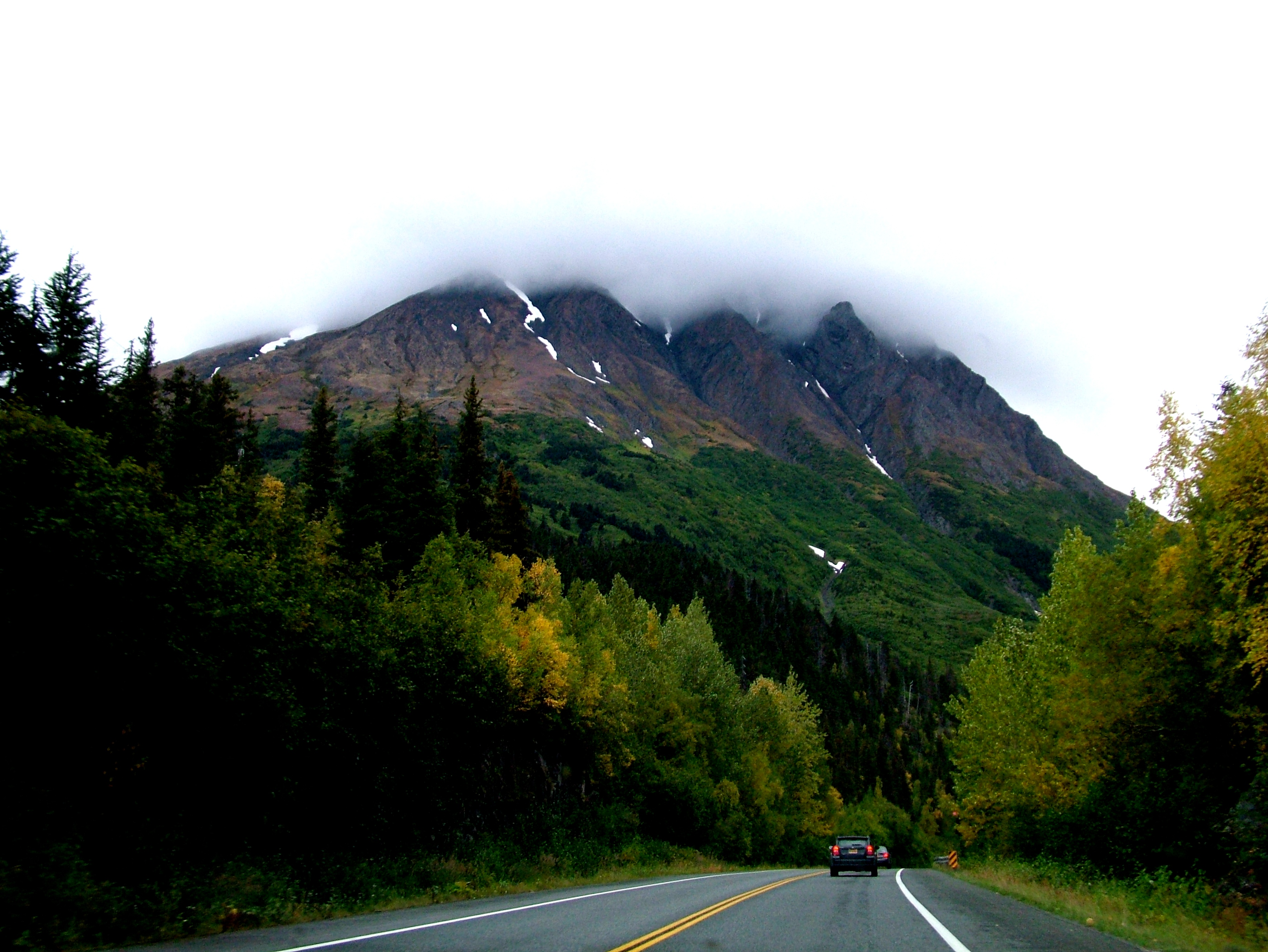
