= Livengood, Alaska =

- CDP
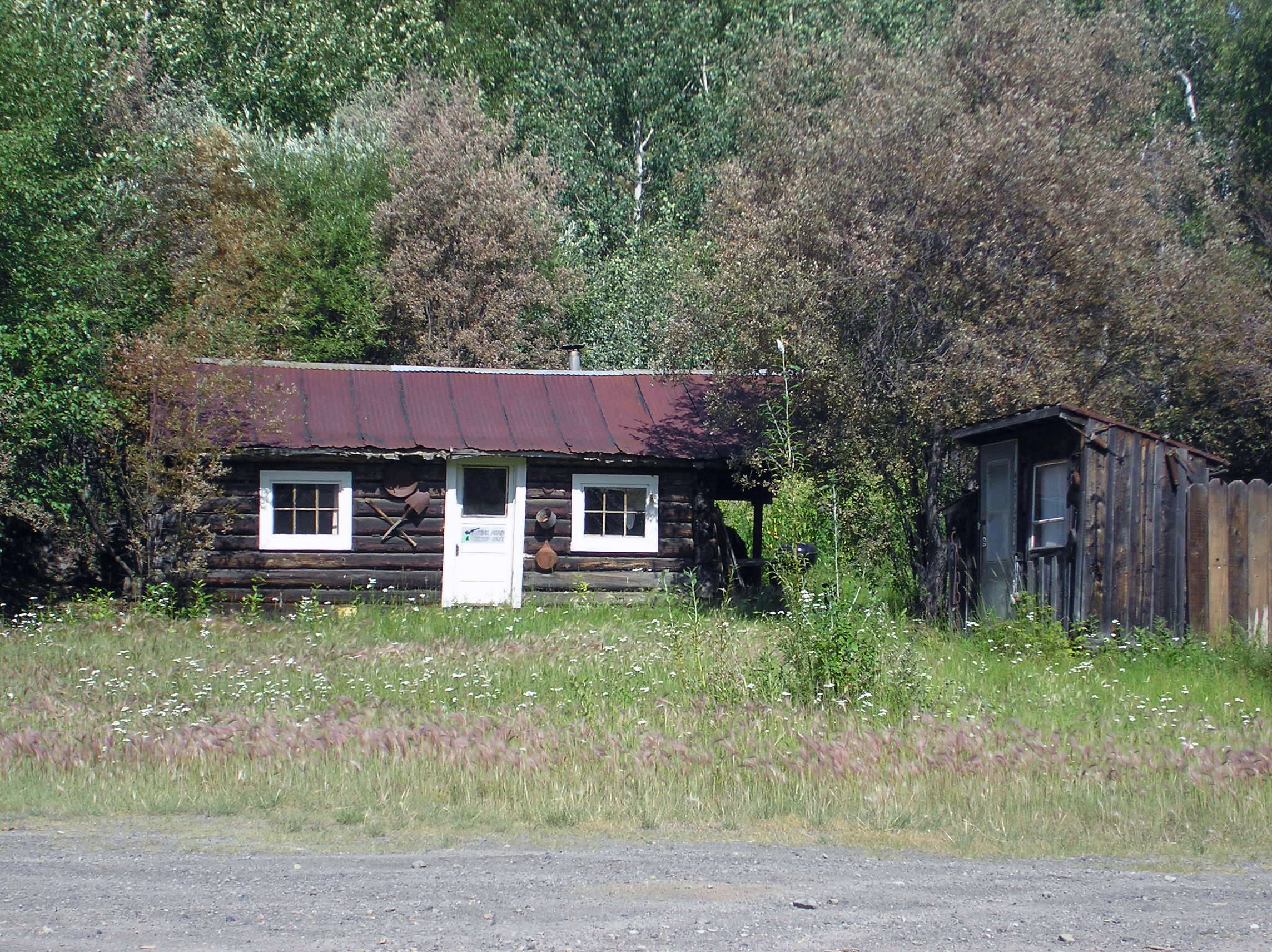
- Livengood cabin

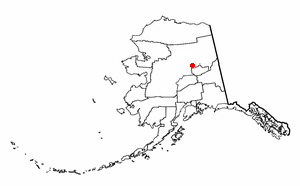
- Location of Livengood, Alaska
- Coordinates: 65°29′24″N 148°32′48″W
- Country: United States
- State: Alaska
- Census Area: Yukon-Koyukuk

Government
  - State senator: Click Bishop (R)
  - State rep.: Mike Cronk (R)

Area
  - Total: 265.64 sq mi (688.01 km^{2})
  - Land: 265.16 sq mi (686.76 km^{2})
  - Water: 0.48 sq mi (1.25 km^{2})
- Elevation: 696 ft (212 m)

Population (2020)
  - Total: 16
  - Density: 0.052/sq mi (0.02/km^{2})
- Time zone: UTC-9 (Alaska (AKST))
  - Summer (DST): UTC-8 (AKDT)
- ZIP code: 99712
- Area code: 907
- FIPS code: 02-44580
- GNIS feature ID: 1405579

Livengood /ˈlaɪvənɡʊd/ is a census-designated place (CDP) in Yukon-Koyukuk Census Area, Alaska, United States. The population was 16 at the 2020 census, compared to 13 in 2010 and 29 in 2000.

== History ==
Gold was discovered in 1914, on Livengood Creek by N.R. Hudson and Jay Livengood. The village was founded near the Hudson/Livengood claim as a mining camp during the winter of 1914-1915, when hundreds of people came into the district.

A post office was established in 1915 and was discontinued in 1957.

A construction camp was located near Livengood during the construction of the Trans-Alaska Pipeline.

Livengood was the last operating location of the antiquated 2600 Hz telephone trunk system. It was switched to the modern system in March 2011.

== Geography ==
Livengood is located at 65°29′24″N 148°32′48″W (65.489993, -148.546629).

According to the United States Census Bureau, the CDP has a total area of 267.8 square miles (694 km^{2}), of which 265.7 square miles (688 km^{2}) is land and 2.2 square miles (5.7 km^{2}) (0.81%) is water.

== Climate ==
Livengood has a dry-winter continental subarctic climate (Köppen Dwc).

Climate data for Livengood
Month	Jan	Feb	Mar	Apr	May	Jun	Jul	Aug	Sep	Oct	Nov	Dec	Year
Record high °F (°C)	38 (3)	36 (2)	50 (10)	91 (33)	79 (26)	90 (32)	88 (31)	87 (31)	78 (26)	70 (21)	44 (7)	39 (4)	91 (33)
Mean daily maximum °F (°C)	−8 (−22)	−0.3 (−17.9)	14.7 (−9.6)	35.2 (1.8)	51.4 (10.8)	67.4 (19.7)	68.8 (20.4)	61.6 (16.4)	48.6 (9.2)	26.9 (−2.8)	6.2 (−14.3)	0.3 (−17.6)	31.1 (−0.5)
Mean daily minimum °F (°C)	−19.4 (−28.6)	−13 (−25)	−5.9 (−21.1)	10.9 (−11.7)	30.1 (−1.1)	42.9 (6.1)	45.5 (7.5)	42.7 (5.9)	29.5 (−1.4)	15.3 (−9.3)	−5.6 (−20.9)	−12.6 (−24.8)	13.4 (−10.3)
Record low °F (°C)	−55 (−48)	−50 (−46)	−41 (−41)	−20 (−29)	−5 (−21)	28 (−2)	28 (−2)	25 (−4)	10 (−12)	−16 (−27)	−47 (−44)	−50 (−46)	−55 (−48)
Average precipitation inches (mm)	0.18 (4.6)	0.22 (5.6)	0.33 (8.4)	0.27 (6.9)	0.81 (21)	1.24 (31)	2.38 (60)	2.38 (60)	1.4 (36)	0.6 (15)	0.32 (8.1)	0.51 (13)	10.63 (270)
Average snowfall inches (cm)	6.7 (17)	7.7 (20)	5.4 (14)	4.1 (10)	0.5 (1.3)	0 (0)	0 (0)	0 (0)	0.3 (0.76)	8.1 (21)	8.1 (21)	11.2 (28)	52.3 (133)
Average precipitation days	3	3	3	2	4	8	10	11	7	5	4	4	64

== Demographics ==
Historical population
Census	Pop.	Note	%±
1920	131		—
1930	22		−83.2%
1940	153		595.5%
1950	40		−73.9%
2000	29		—
2010	13		−55.2%
2020	16		23.1%
U.S. Decennial Census

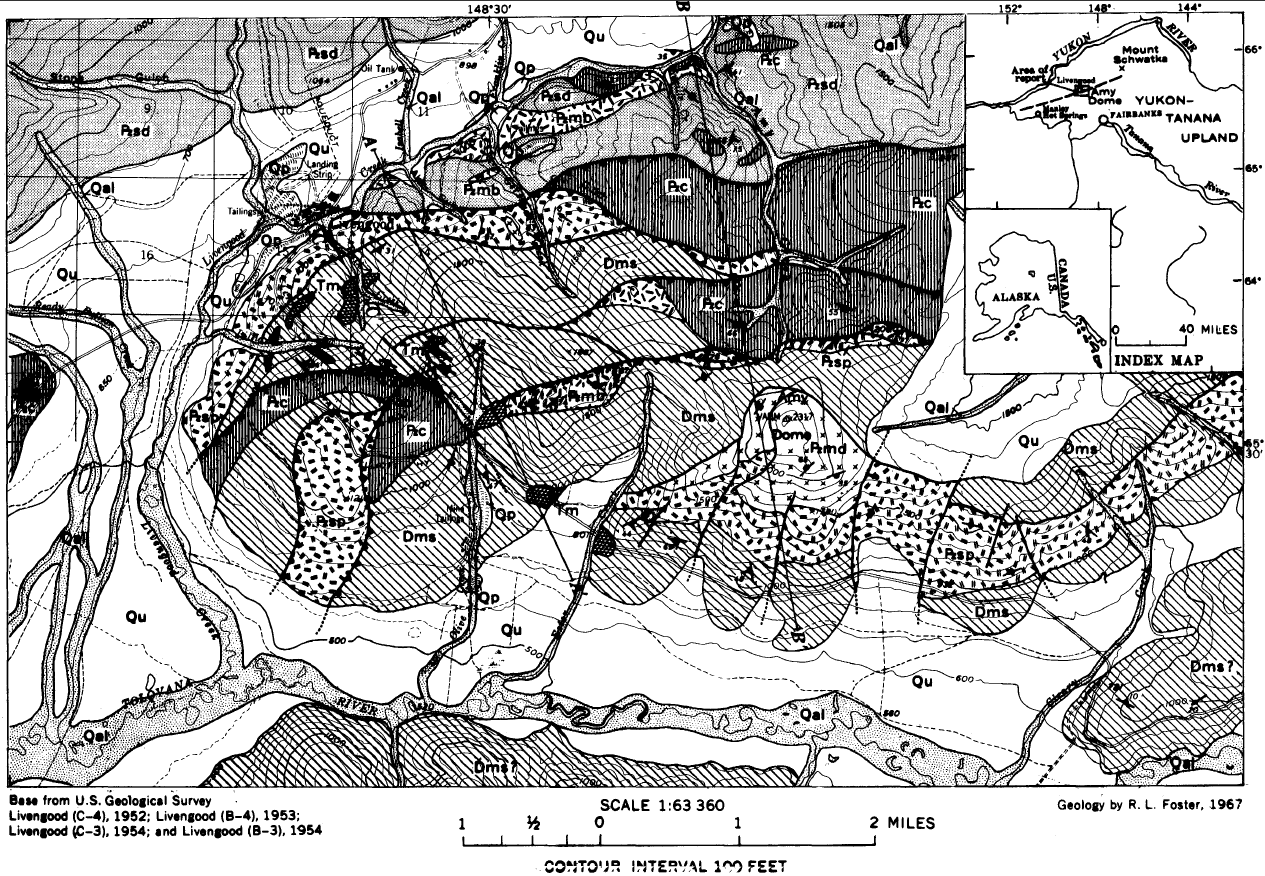
Geological map of the Livengood District, where Qp are placer workings

Livengood first appeared on the 1920 U.S. Census as an unincorporated village. It continued to appear until 1950. It did not return again until 2000, when it was made a census-designated place (CDP).

As of the census of 2000, there were 29 people, 13 households, and 6 families residing in the CDP. The population density was 0.1 inhabitants per square mile (0.039/km^{2}). There were 31 housing units at an average density of 0.11/sq mi (0.04/km^{2}). The racial makeup of the CDP was 83% White, 7% Native American, 3% Asian, and 7% from two or more races.

There were 13 households, out of which 15% had children under the age of 18 living with them, 40% were married couples living together, and 55% were non-families. 45% of all households were made up of individuals, and 10% had someone living alone who was 65 years of age or older. The average household size was 2.2 and the average family size was 3.2.

In the CDP, the age distribution of the population shows 31% under the age of 18, 21% from 25 to 44, 45% from 45 to 64, and 3% who were 65 years of age or older. The median age was 44 years. For every 100 females, there were 107 males [14 females, 15 males]. For every 100 females age 18 and over, there were 150 males [8 females, 12 males].

The median income for a household in the CDP was $26,250, and the median income for a family was $26,250. Males had a median income of $51,250 versus $0 for females. The per capita income for the CDP was $21,215. There were no families and 15% of the population living below the poverty line, including no under eighteens and none of those over 64.
