= Alabaster Peak =

Mountain summit in Alaska, United States

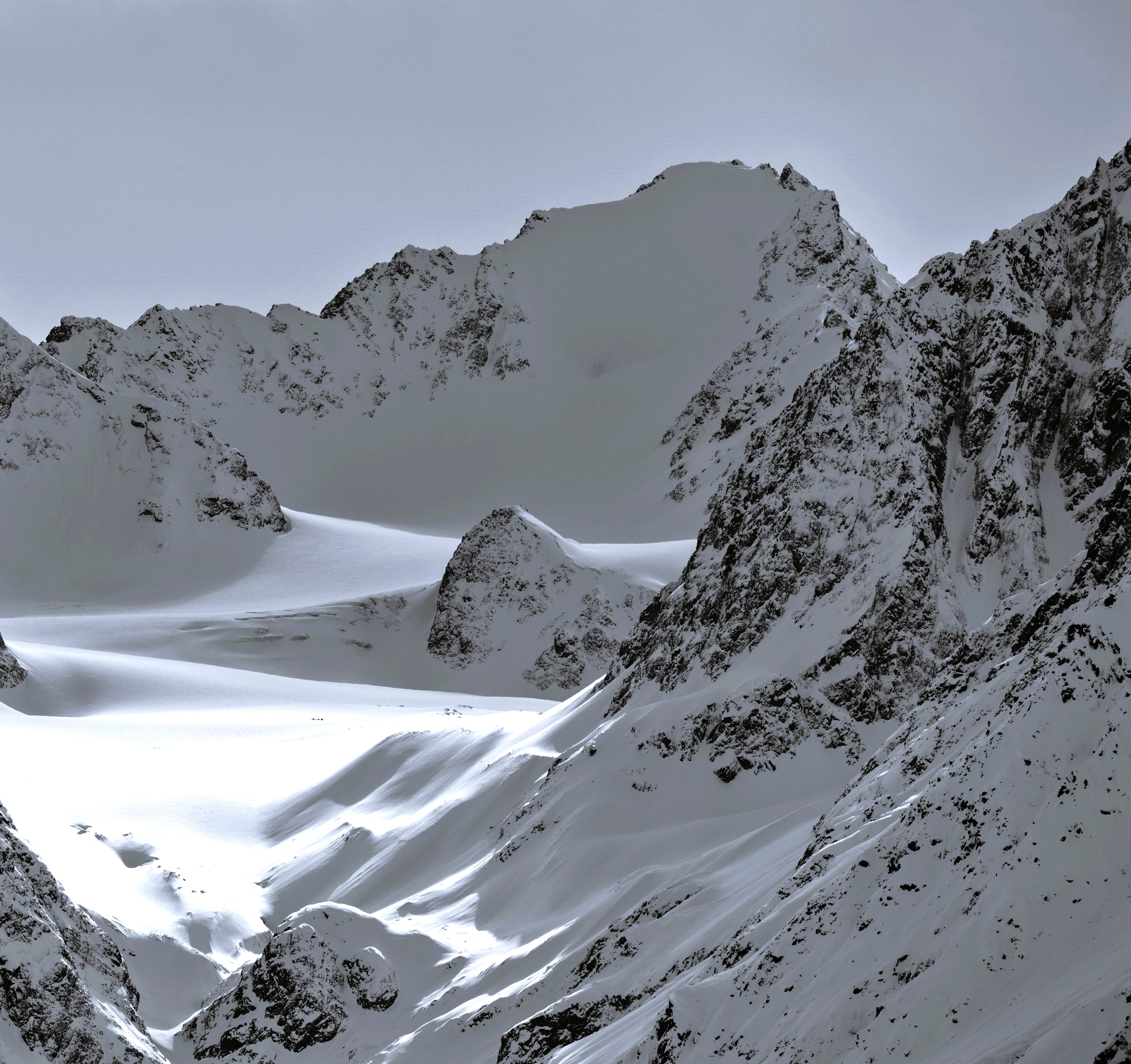
- North aspect

Highest point
- Elevation: 8,065 ft (2,458 m)
- Prominence: 815 ft (248 m)
- Isolation: 1.29 mi (2.08 km)
- Coordinates: 61°39′54″N 148°08′06″W

Naming
- Etymology: Alabaster

Geography
- Location within Alaska
- Interactive map of
- Country: United States
- State: Alaska
- Borough: Matanuska-Susitna
- Parent range: Chugach Mountains
- Topo map: USGS Anchorage C-4

Climbing
- First ascent: 1970
- Easiest route: North Ridge

Alabaster Peak is an 8,065-foot-elevation (2,458-meter) mountain summit located 35 miles (56 km) east of Palmer, in the northern Chugach Mountains of Alaska. This peak of the Matanuska Valley is set midway between Anchorage and Glennallen, and can be seen from the Glenn Highway. It is situated 15 miles (24 km) west of Matanuska Glacier and 1.8 miles (2.9 km) south of Awesome Peak. Precipitation runoff from the mountain drains into Coal, Monument, and Gravel creeks, which are tributaries of the Matanuska River. Topographic relief is significant as the summit rises 3,065 feet (934 meters) along the west slope in one mile (1.6 km). The first ascent of the summit was made on July 4, 1970, by Robert Spurr, Bob Pelz, and Royce Purinton via the Spectrum Glacier and North Ridge. This mountain's toponym has not been officially adopted by the United States Board on Geographic Names, so it is only marked as "8065" on USGS maps.

== Climate ==
Based on the Köppen climate classification, Alabaster Peak is located in a subarctic climate zone with long, cold, snowy winters, and mild summers. Weather systems coming off the Gulf of Alaska are forced upwards by the Chugach Mountains (orographic lift), causing heavy precipitation in the form of rainfall and snowfall. Winter temperatures can drop below 0 °F with wind chill factors below −10 °F. This climate supports small unnamed glaciers and permanent snowfields on its slopes. The months May through June offer the most favorable weather for climbing or viewing.

== Gallery ==
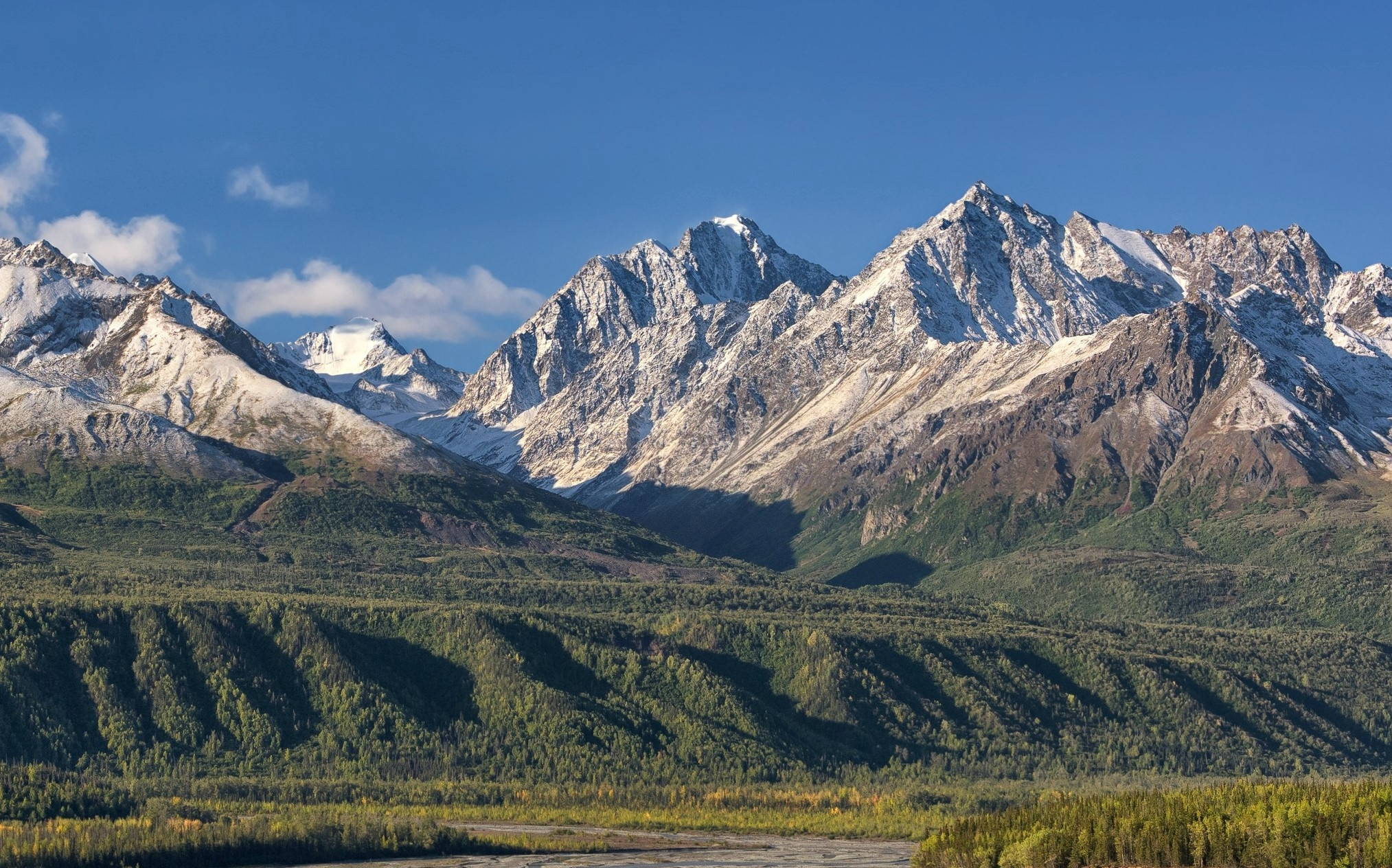
Alabaster is the white peak to left in back, Awesome Peak (center), Peak 7417 to right

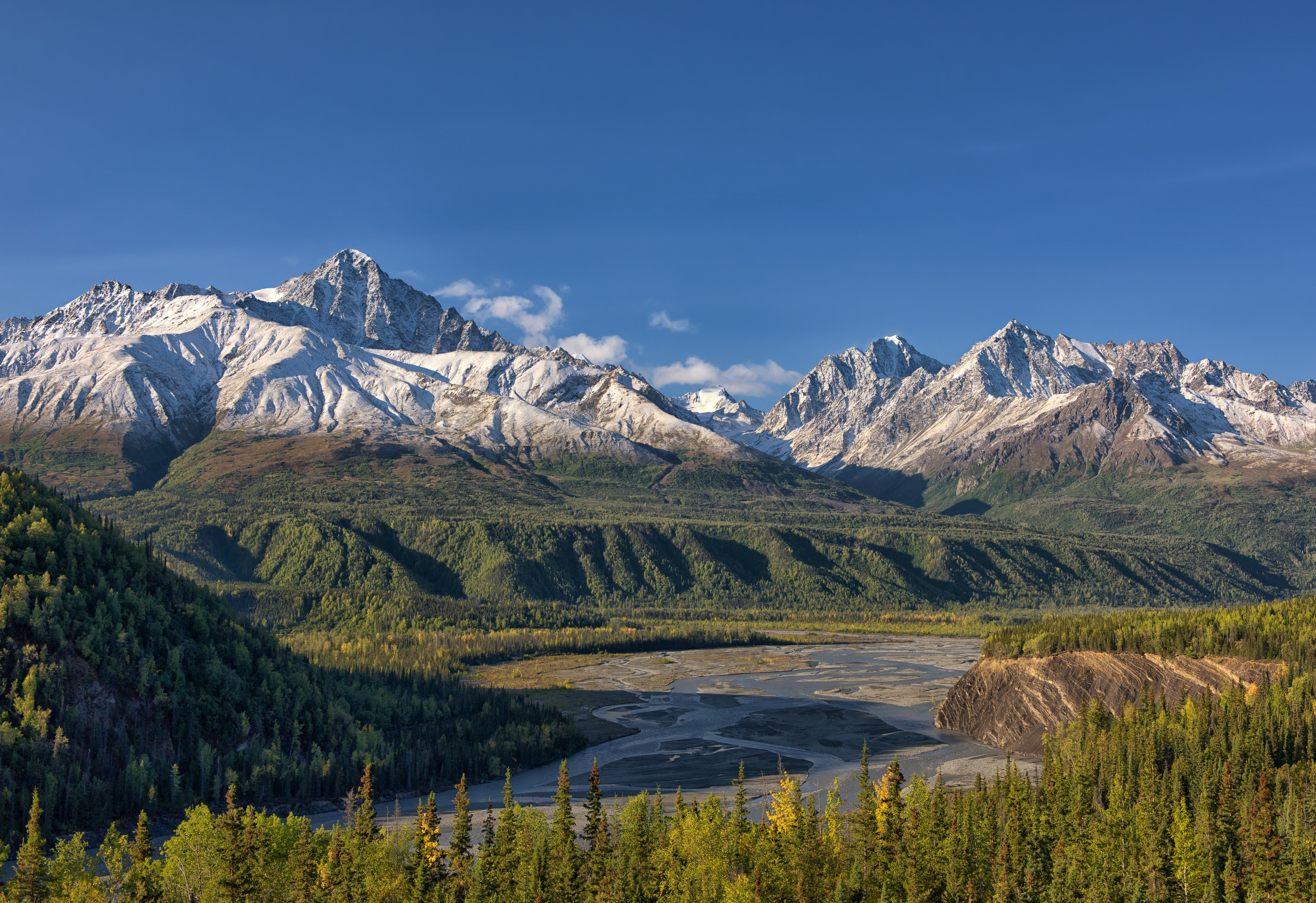
Amulet Peak (left), Matanuska River, Awesome Peak to right of center, and Alabaster Peak centered in back

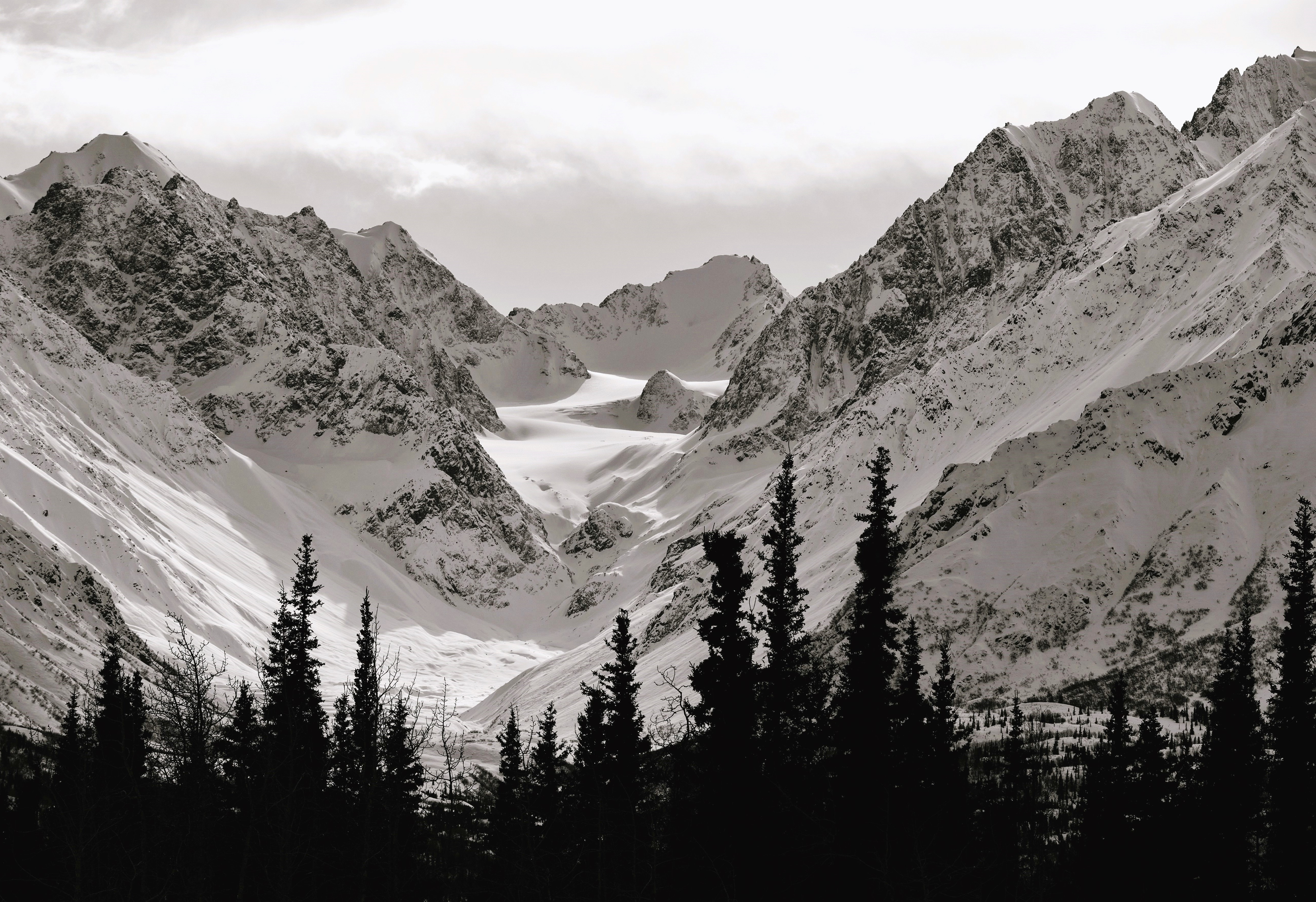
Alabaster Peak centered in back, looking though valley of Monument Creek

== See also ==
- Matanuska Formation
- Geography of Alaska
