= Sweden Peak =

Mountain in Alaska, United States

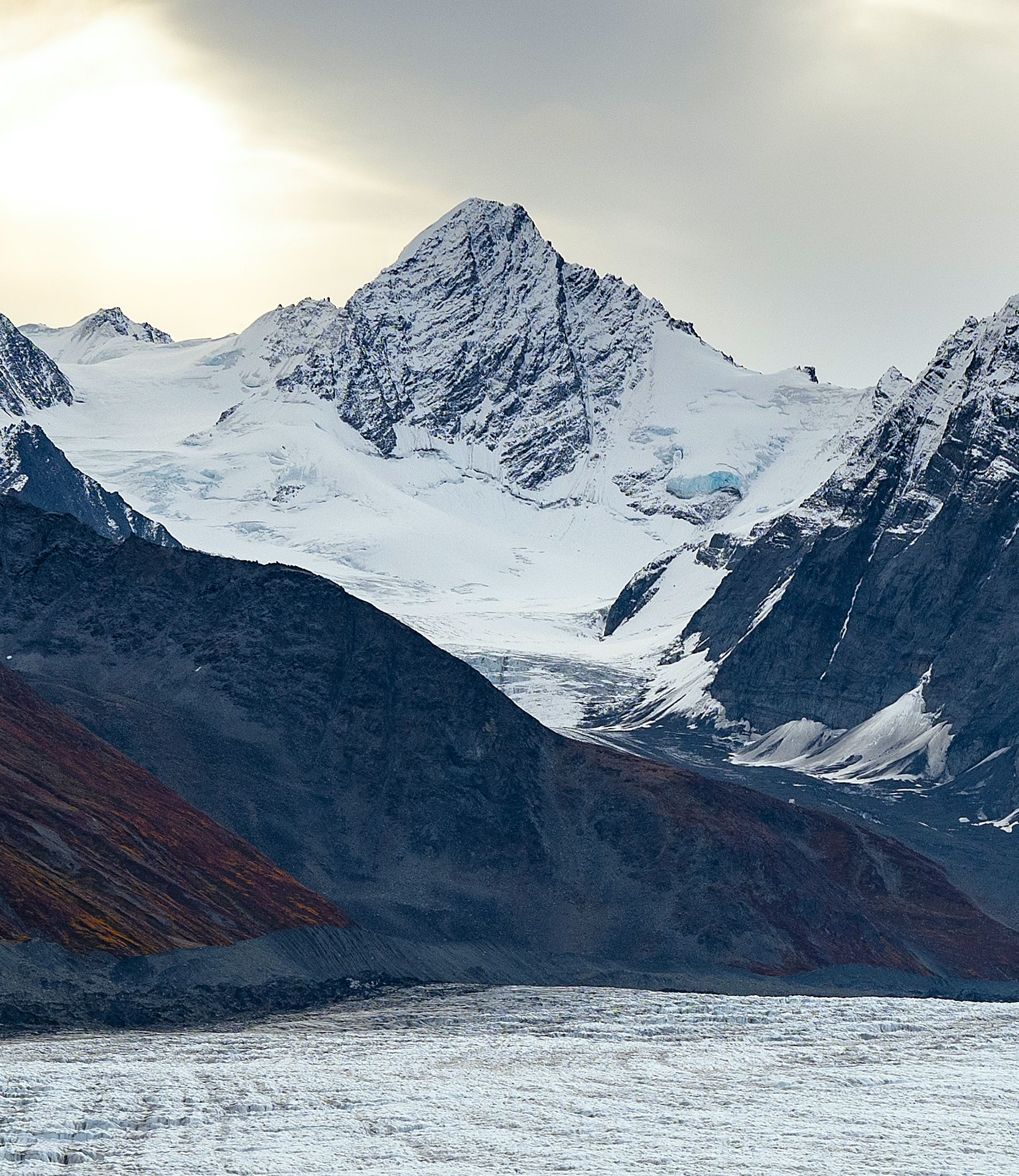
- Northwest aspect

Highest point
- Elevation: 9,030 ft (2,752 m)
- Prominence: 730 ft (223 m)
- Parent peak: Finland Peak
- Isolation: 0.68 mi (1.09 km)
- Coordinates: 61°34′24″N 147°23′56″W

Naming
- Etymology: Sweden

Geography
- Location within Alaska
- Country: United States
- State: Alaska
- Borough: Matanuska-Susitna
- Protected area: Chugach National Forest
- Parent range: Chugach Mountains
- Topo map: USGS Anchorage C-2

Sweden Peak is a 9,030-foot (2,752 m) mountain summit in Alaska, United States.

== Description ==
Sweden Peak is located in the Chugach Mountains approximately midway between Anchorage and Glennallen. It is situated 14 miles (23 km) southeast of Mount Wickersham near the head of Matanuska Glacier. Sweden Peak's toponym was officially adopted in 1977 by the United States Board on Geographic Names, along with Denmark Peak, Norway Peak, and Finland Peak to honor Alaskan settlers from Scandinavia. Sweden Peak is part of a cluster of peaks that surround the unofficially named Scandinavia Glacier, which is a tributary of the Matanuska Glacier. Precipitation runoff from the mountain drains to the Matanuska River. Topographic relief is significant as the south face rises 2,030 ft (620 m) in one-half mile (0.80 km).

== Climate ==
Based on the Köppen climate classification, Sweden Peak is located in a tundra climate zone with long, cold, snowy winters, and mild summers. Weather systems coming off the Gulf of Alaska are forced upwards by the Chugach Mountains (orographic lift), causing heavy precipitation in the form of rainfall and snowfall. Winter temperatures can drop below -10 °F with wind chill factors below −20 °F. The months May through June offer the most favorable weather for climbing or viewing.

== Gallery ==
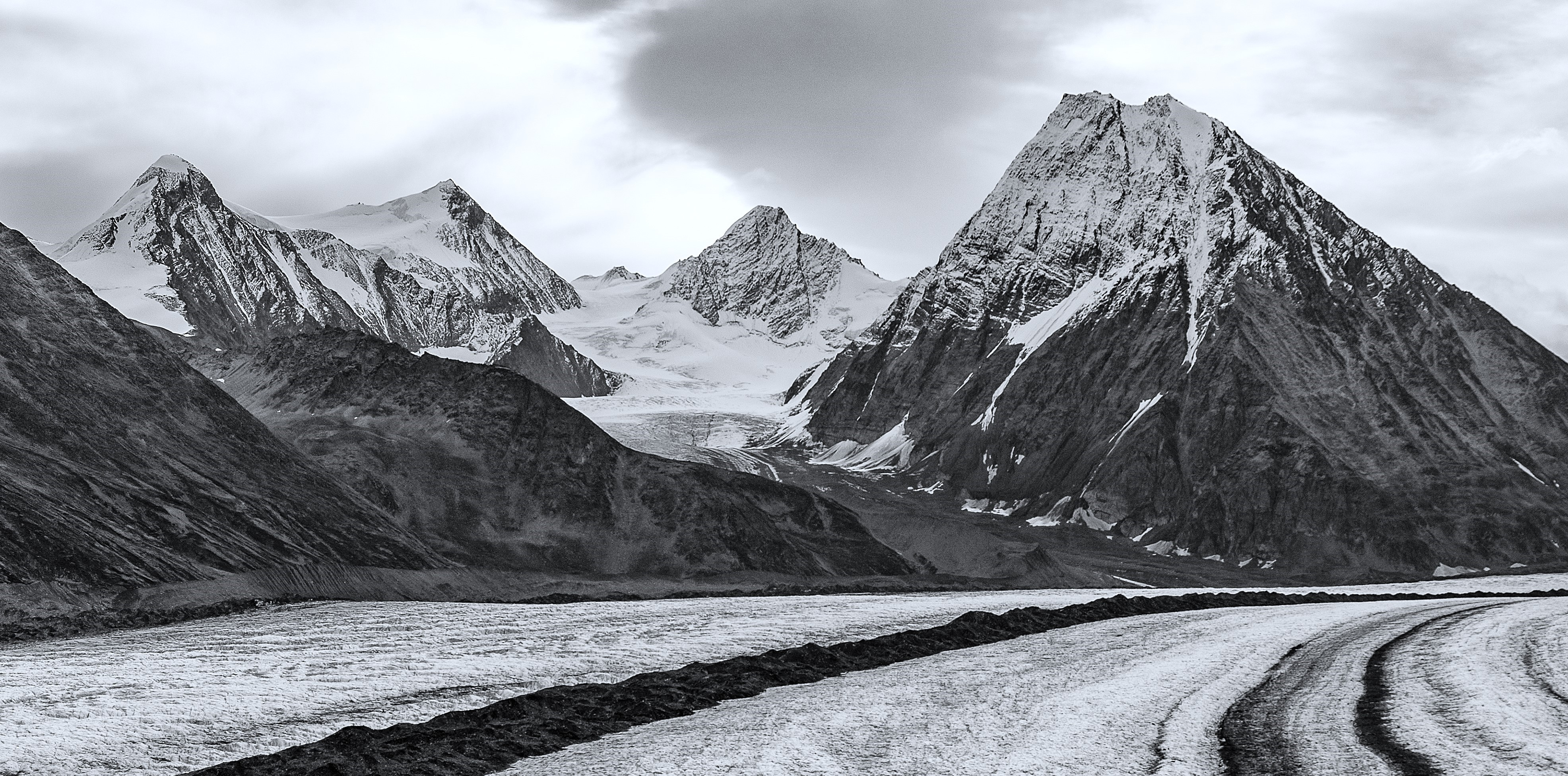
Left to right: Norway, Finland, Sweden, and Denmark peaks

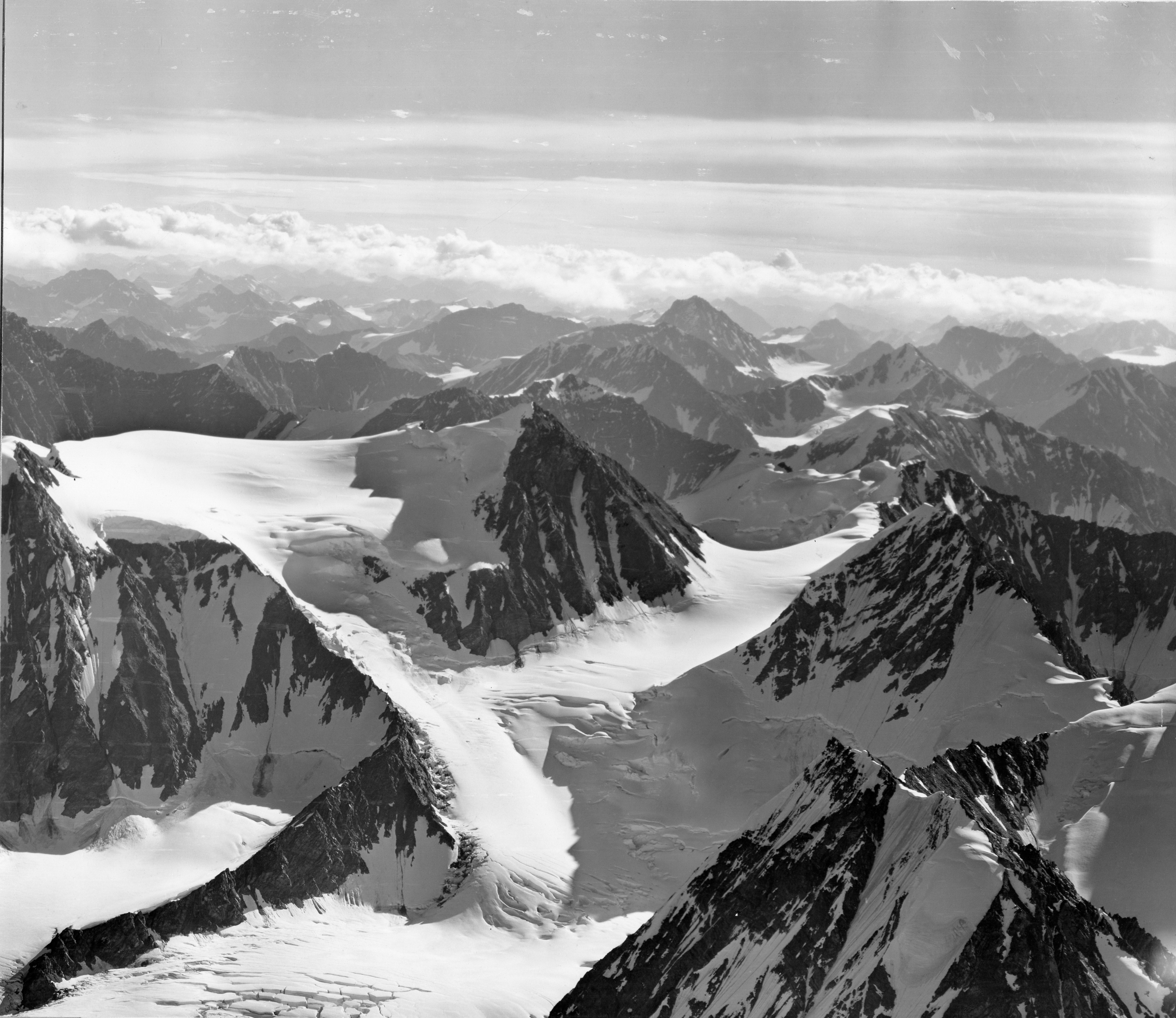
Finland Peak centered, Sweden Peak right, Denmark Peak lower right. Aerial view from west.

== See also ==
- Geography of Alaska
