= Finland Peak =

Mountain in Alaska, United States

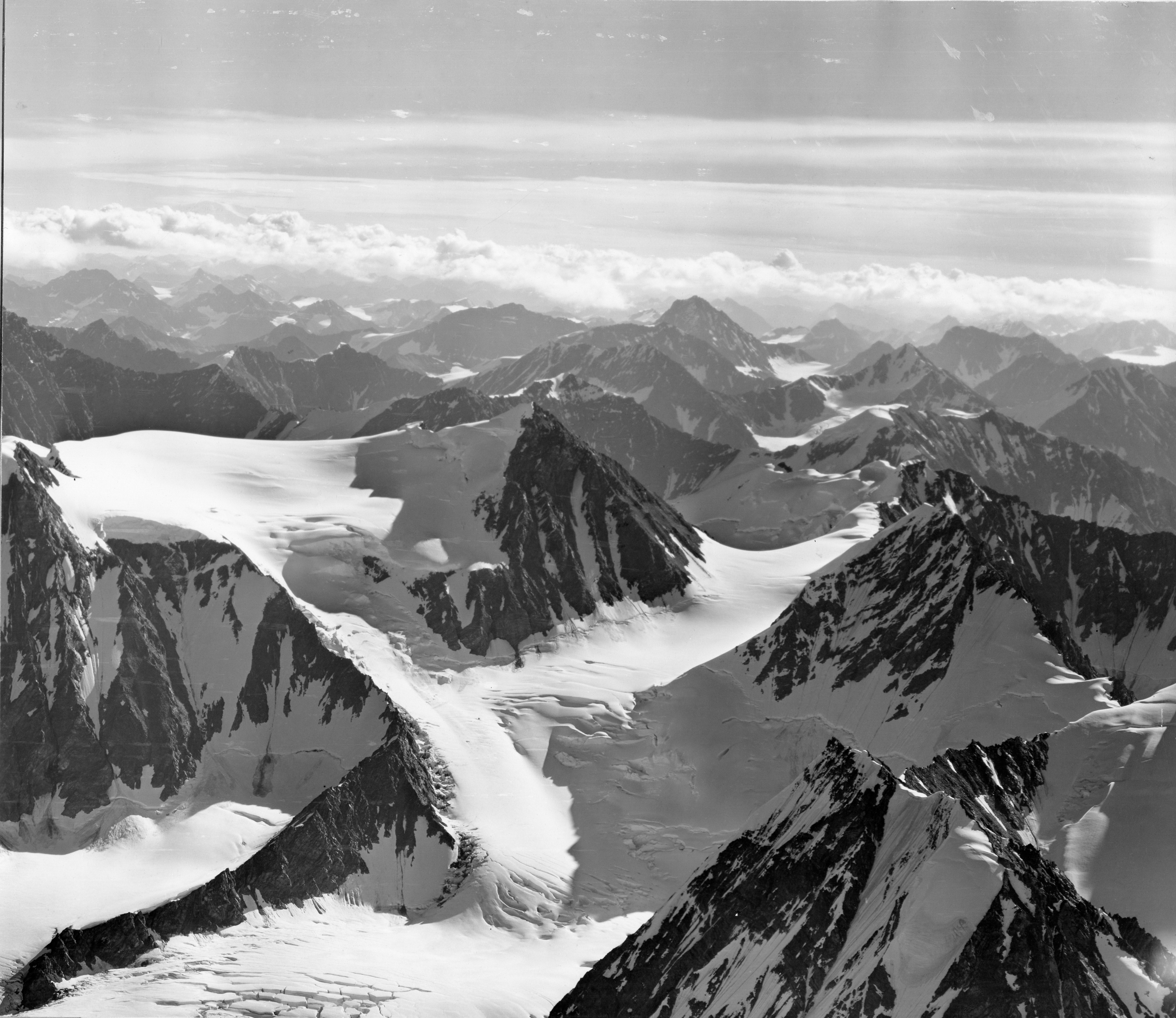
- Finland Peak centered, west aspect (Sweden Peak right, Denmark Peak lower right)

Highest point
- Elevation: 9,405 ft (2,867 m)
- Prominence: 1,755 ft (535 m)
- Parent peak: Peak 9595
- Isolation: 2.80 mi (4.51 km)
- Coordinates: 61°34′54″N 147°23′04″W

Geography
- Location within Alaska
- Country: United States
- State: Alaska
- Borough: Matanuska-Susitna
- Protected area: Chugach National Forest
- Parent range: Chugach Mountains
- Topo map: USGS Anchorage C-2

Climbing
- First ascent: 1990
- Easiest route: North Ridge

Finland Peak is a 9,405-foot (2,867 m) elevation mountain summit in the U.S. state of Alaska.

== Description ==
Finland Peak is located in the Chugach Mountains approximately midway between Anchorage and Glennallen. It is situated 14 miles (23 km) southeast of Mount Wickersham near the head of Matanuska Glacier. Precipitation runoff from the mountain drains north to the Matanuska River. Finland Peak's toponym was officially adopted in 1977 by the United States Board on Geographic Names, along with Sweden Peak, Norway Peak, and Denmark Peak to honor Alaskan settlers from the Nordic countries. Finland Peak is the highest of this cluster of peaks that surround the unofficially named Scandinavia Glacier, which is a tributary of the Matanuska Glacier. The first ascent of Finland Peak was made on July 6, 1990, by Willy Hersman, Neil O'Donnell, and Tom Choate, who were members of the Mountaineering Club of Alaska. Another report claims that USGS employees were on the peak in 1960 assisted by a helicopter.

== Climate ==
Based on the Köppen climate classification, Finland Peak is located in a tundra climate zone with long, cold, snowy winters, and mild summers. Weather systems coming off the Gulf of Alaska are forced upwards by the Chugach Mountains (orographic lift), causing heavy precipitation in the form of rainfall and snowfall. Winter temperatures can drop below -10 °F with wind chill factors below −20 °F. The months May through June offer the most favorable weather for climbing or viewing.

== See also ==
- Geography of Alaska
