= Denmark Peak =

Mountain in Alaska, United States

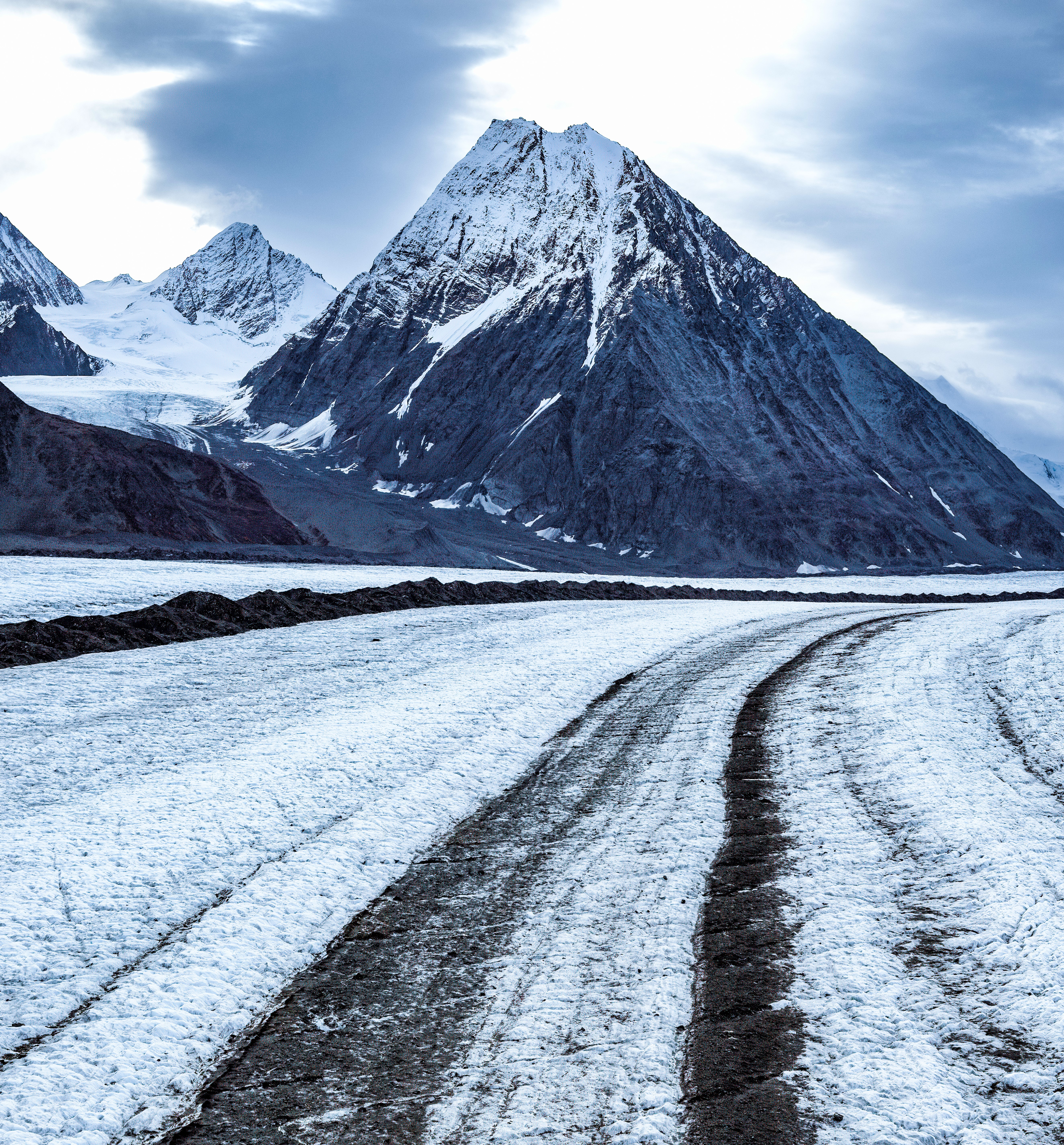
- Northwest aspect

Highest point
- Elevation: 8,660 ft (2,640 m)
- Prominence: 660 ft (201 m)
- Isolation: 0.77 mi (1.24 km)
- Coordinates: 61°34′35″N 147°27′01″W

Naming
- Etymology: Denmark

Geography
- Location within Alaska
- Country: United States
- State: Alaska
- Borough: Matanuska-Susitna
- Protected area: Chugach National Forest
- Parent range: Chugach Mountains
- Topo map: USGS Anchorage C-2

Denmark Peak is an 8,660-foot (2,640 m) mountain summit in Alaska, United States.

== Description ==
Denmark Peak is located in the Chugach Mountains approximately midway between Anchorage and Glennallen. It is situated 12.5 miles (20.1 km) southeast of Mount Wickersham near the head of Matanuska Glacier. Denmark Peak's toponym was officially adopted in 1977 by the United States Board on Geographic Names, along with Sweden Peak, Norway Peak, and Finland Peak to honor Alaskan settlers from Scandinavia. Denmark Peak is the lowest of this cluster of peaks that surround the unofficially named Scandinavia Glacier, which is a tributary of the Matanuska Glacier. Precipitation runoff from the mountain drains north to the Matanuska River. Topographic relief is significant as the summit rises 3,960 ft (1,210 m) above the Matanuska Glacier in one mile (1.6 km).

== Climate ==
Based on the Köppen climate classification, Denmark Peak is located in a tundra climate zone with long, cold, snowy winters, and mild summers. Weather systems coming off the Gulf of Alaska are forced upwards by the Chugach Mountains (orographic lift), causing heavy precipitation in the form of rainfall and snowfall. Winter temperatures can drop below -10 °F with wind chill factors below −20 °F. The months May through June offer the most favorable weather for climbing or viewing.

== Gallery ==
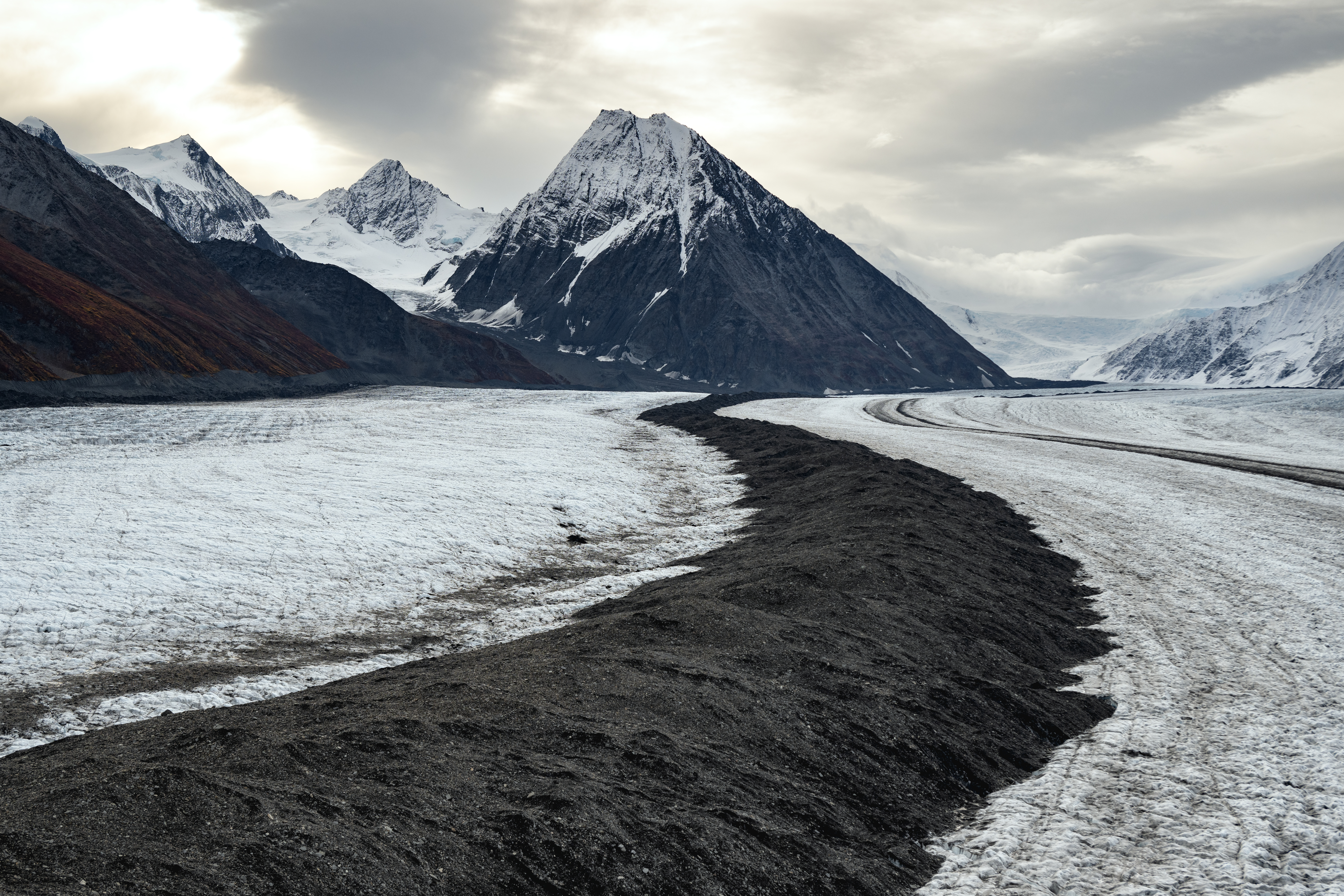
Denmark Peak centered above the Matanuska Glacier

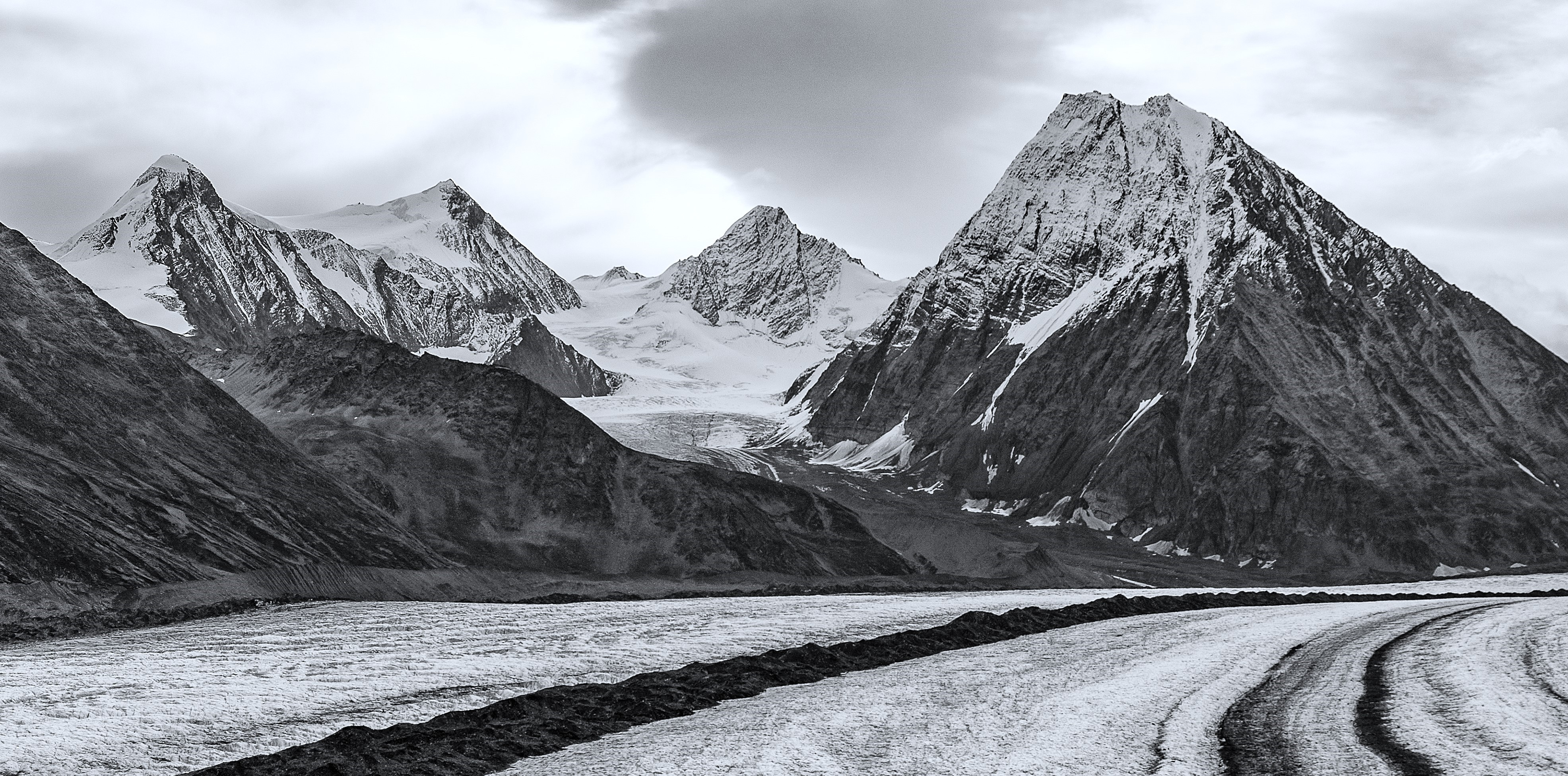
Left to right: Norway, Finland, Sweden, and Denmark peaks

== See also ==
- Geography of Alaska
