= Awesome Peak =

Mountain in Alaska, United States

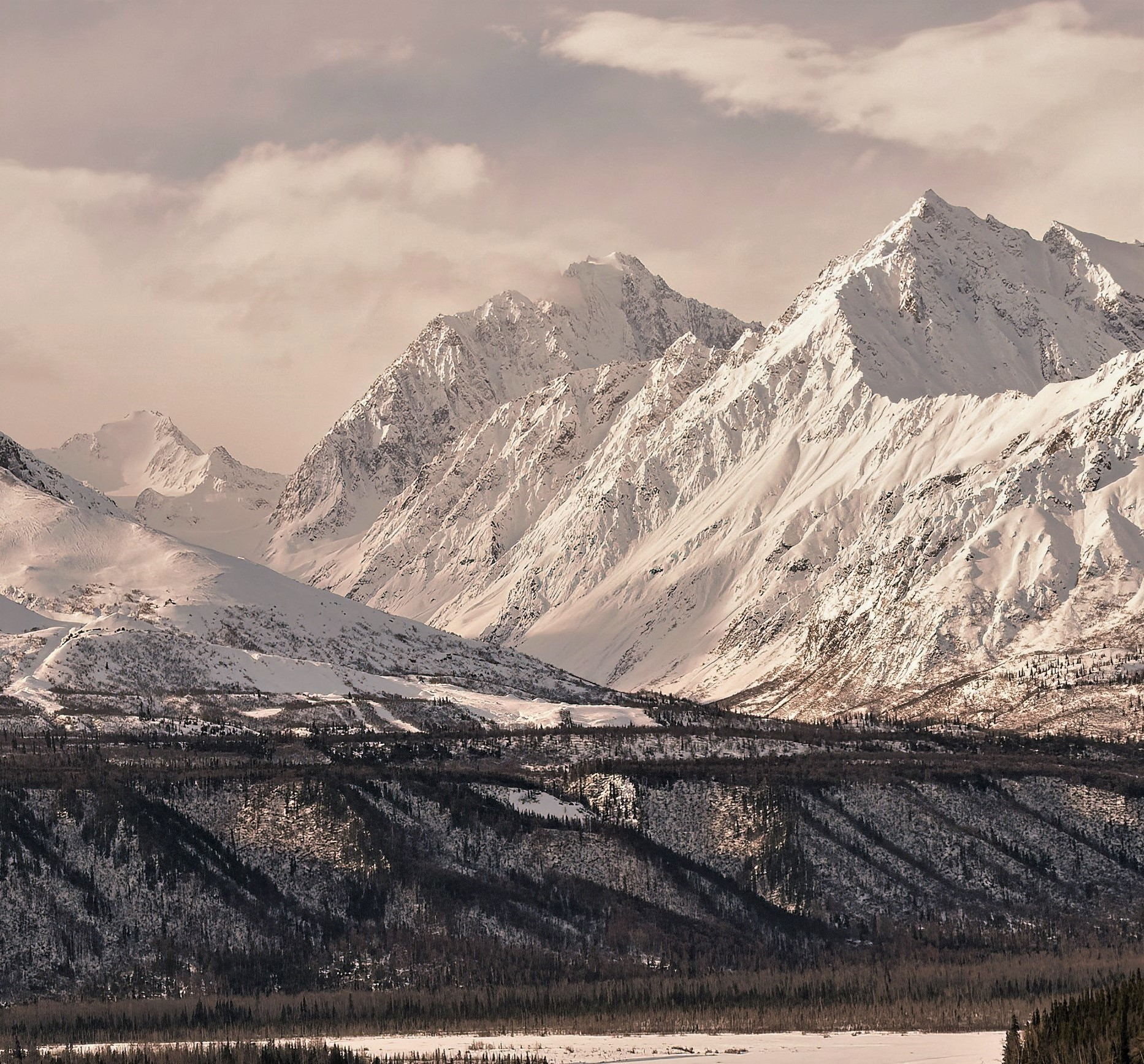
- North face centered, from Glenn Highway

Highest point
- Elevation: 8,645 ft (2,635 m)
- Prominence: 1,995 ft (608 m)
- Isolation: 8.72 mi (14.03 km)
- Coordinates: 61°41′28″N 148°08′22″W

Geography
- Location within Alaska
- Interactive map of Awesome Peak
- Country: United States
- State: Alaska
- Borough: Matanuska-Susitna
- Parent range: Chugach Mountains
- Topo map: USGS Anchorage C-4

Awesome Peak is an 8,645-foot-elevation (2,635-meter) mountain summit located 35 miles (56 km) east-northeast of Palmer, in the northern Chugach Mountains of Alaska. This peak of the Matanuska Valley is set midway between Anchorage and Glennallen, near mile 90 of the Glenn Highway. It is situated 15 miles (24 km) west of Matanuska Glacier and 3.7 mi (6 km) southwest of Amulet Peak. Precipitation runoff from the mountain drains into Monument and Coal creeks, which are tributaries of the Matanuska River. Topographic relief is significant as the summit rises 5,650 feet (1,720 meters) above Coal Creek in 3.75 miles (6 km) and 4,650 feet (1,420 meters) above Monument Creek in 1.9 mile (3 km). This mountain's toponym has not been officially adopted by the United States Board on Geographic Names, so it is only marked as "8645" on USGS maps.

== Climate ==
Based on the Köppen climate classification, Awesome Peak is located in a subarctic climate zone with long, cold, snowy winters, and mild summers. Weather systems coming off the Gulf of Alaska are forced upwards by the Chugach Mountains (orographic lift), causing heavy precipitation in the form of rainfall and snowfall. Temperatures can drop below −20 °C with wind chill factors below −30 °C. This climate supports small unnamed glaciers and permanent snowfields on its slopes. The months May through June offer the most favorable weather for climbing or viewing.

== Gallery ==
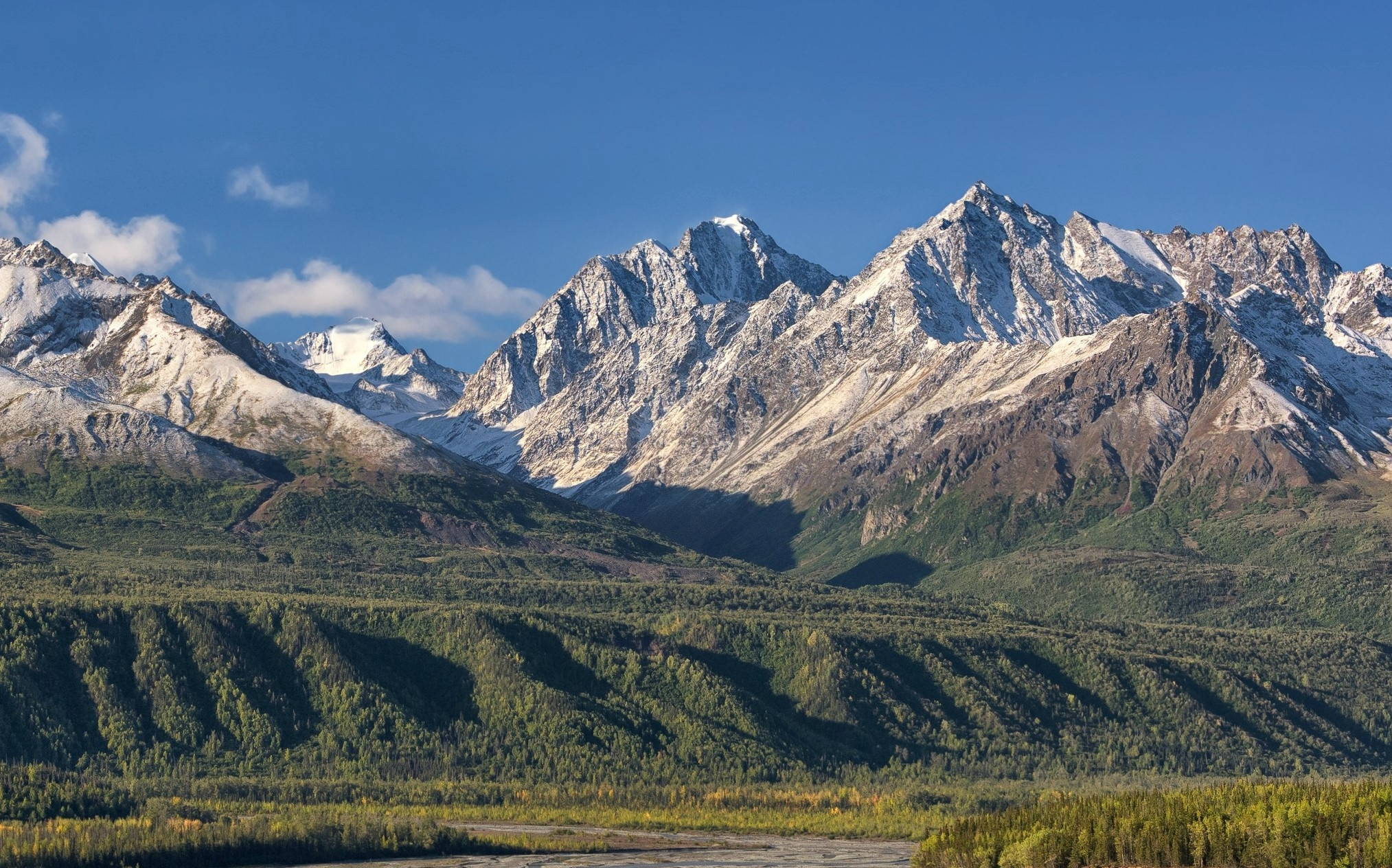
North aspect of Awesome Peak (center), Alabaster Peak to left in back, Peak 7417 to right

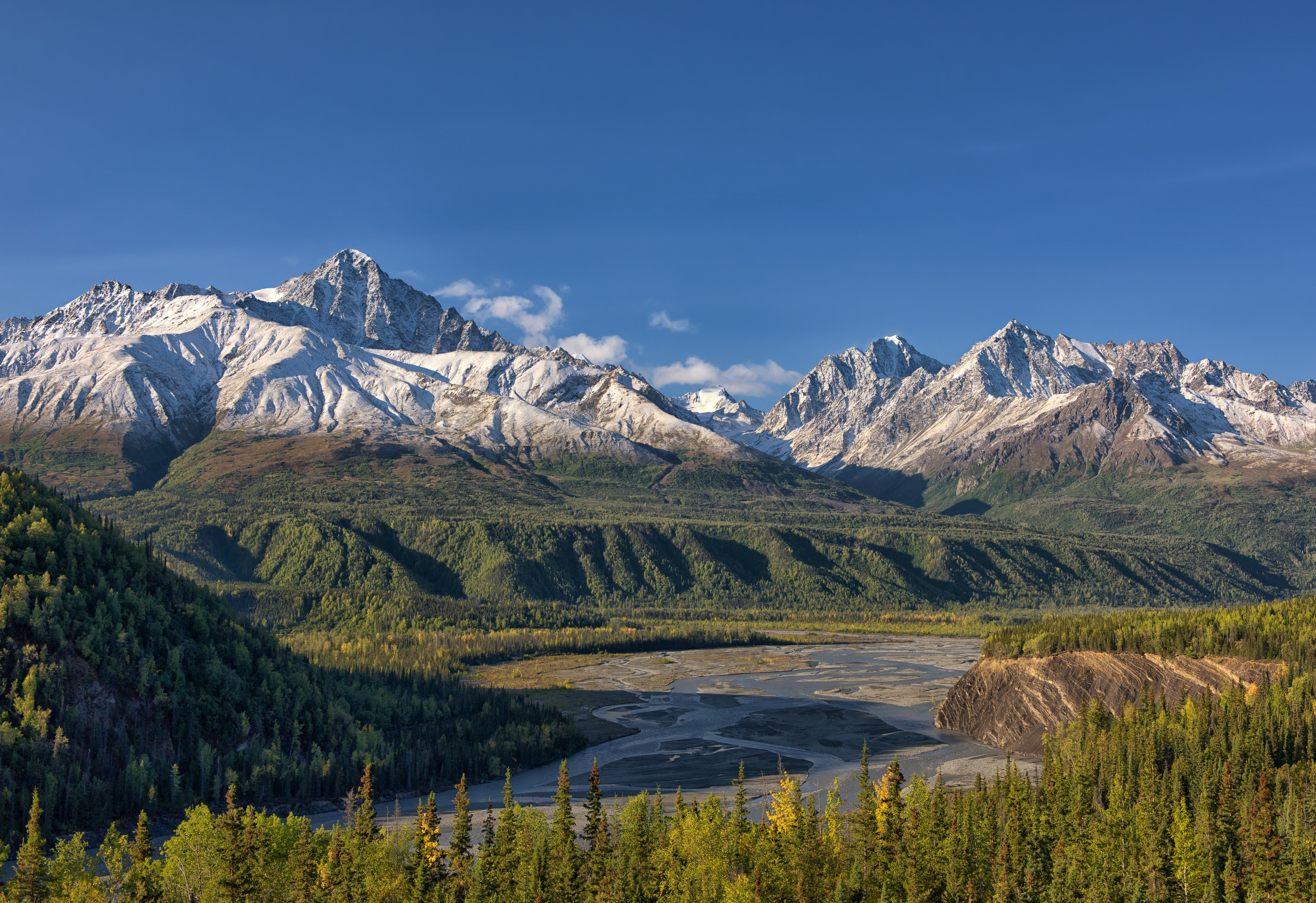
Amulet Peak (left), Matanuska River, and Awesome Peak to right of center

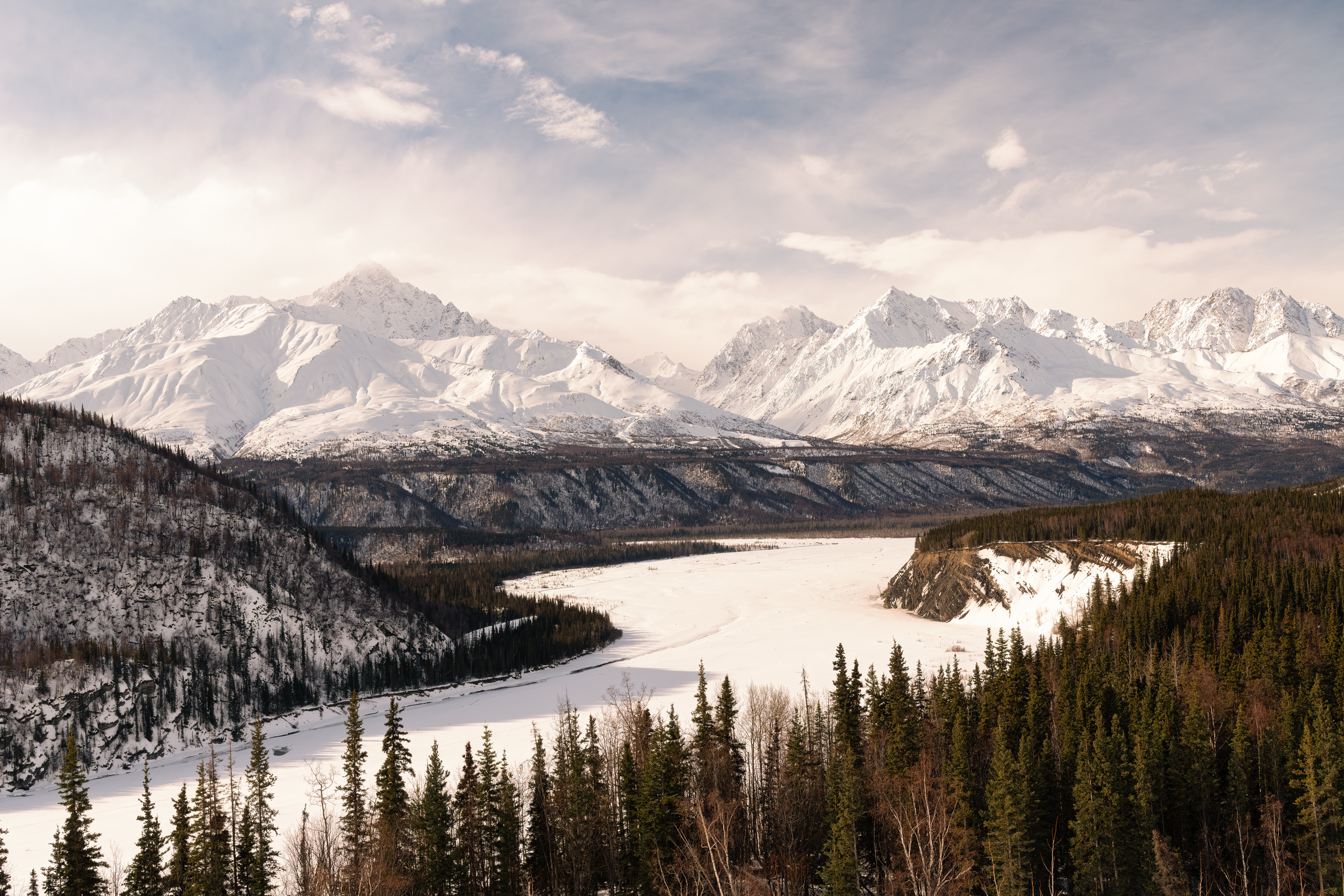
Awesome Peak near center

== See also ==
- Matanuska Formation
- Geography of Alaska
