= Lionhead =

Lionhead may refer to

- Lionhead (goldfish), a variety of goldfish
- Lionhead cichlid (Steatocranus casuarius), a fish
- Lionhead rabbit, a breed of domestic rabbit
- Lionhead Studios, a computer game development company
- Lion Head (Alaska), a mountain in Alaska
- Lionhead Unit, a campground at Priest Lake in Northern Idaho
- The head of a lion

== See also ==
- Lion's Head (disambiguation)
