= King Mountain State Recreation Site =

Coordinates: 61°46′28″N 148°29′41″W

King Mountain State Recreation Site is a state park along the Matanuska River near Chickaloon, Alaska. It features a campground and other visitor amenities. It is located immediately northeast of King Mountain, at mile 76 of the Glenn Highway.
