= Lion Head (Alaska) =

Mountain summit in Alaska, United States

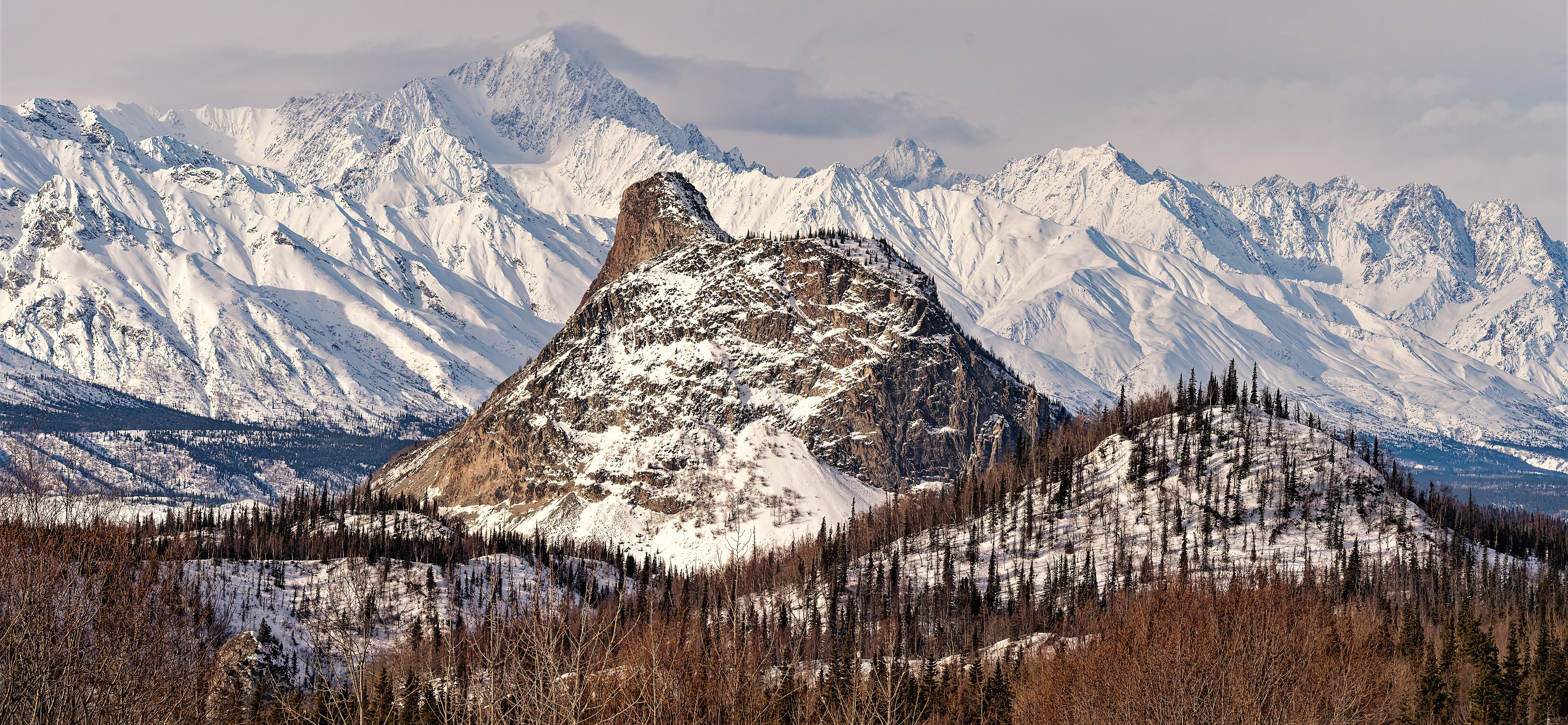
- Lion Head centered, from east-northeast (Amulet Peak in the background)

Highest point
- Elevation: 3,185 ft (971 m)
- Prominence: 1,035 ft (315 m)
- Isolation: 2.04 mi (3.28 km)
- Coordinates: 61°46′59″N 147°40′03″W

Geography
- Location within Alaska
- Interactive map of Lion Head
- Country: United States
- State: Alaska
- Borough: Matanuska-Susitna
- Parent range: Chugach Mountains
- Topo map: USGS Anchorage D-2

Lion Head is a 3,185-foot-elevation (971-meter) summit located 49 miles (79 km) east-northeast of Palmer, in the northern Chugach Mountains of Alaska. This iconic landmark of the Matanuska Valley is set alongside the Glenn Highway midway between Anchorage and Glennallen. It is situated at the confluence of Caribou Creek with Matanuska River and less than two miles (3.2 km) northeast of the terminus of Matanuska Glacier. Precipitation runoff from the mountain drains into the Matanuska River and topographic relief is significant as the summit rises 1,500 feet (460 meters) above the river in 0.3 mile (0.5 km). An ascent of the summit involves hiking 2.3 miles (round-trip) with 1,100 feet of elevation gain, on land owned by AT&T. This landform's descriptive toponym has been officially adopted by the United States Board on Geographic Names.

== Climate ==
Based on the Köppen climate classification, Lion Head is located in a subarctic climate zone with long, cold, snowy winters, and mild summers. Weather systems coming off the Gulf of Alaska are forced upwards by the Chugach Mountains (orographic lift), causing heavy precipitation in the form of rainfall and snowfall. Winter temperatures can drop below −20 °C with wind chill factors below −30 °C. The months of June through September offer the most favorable weather to visit Lion Head.

== Gallery ==
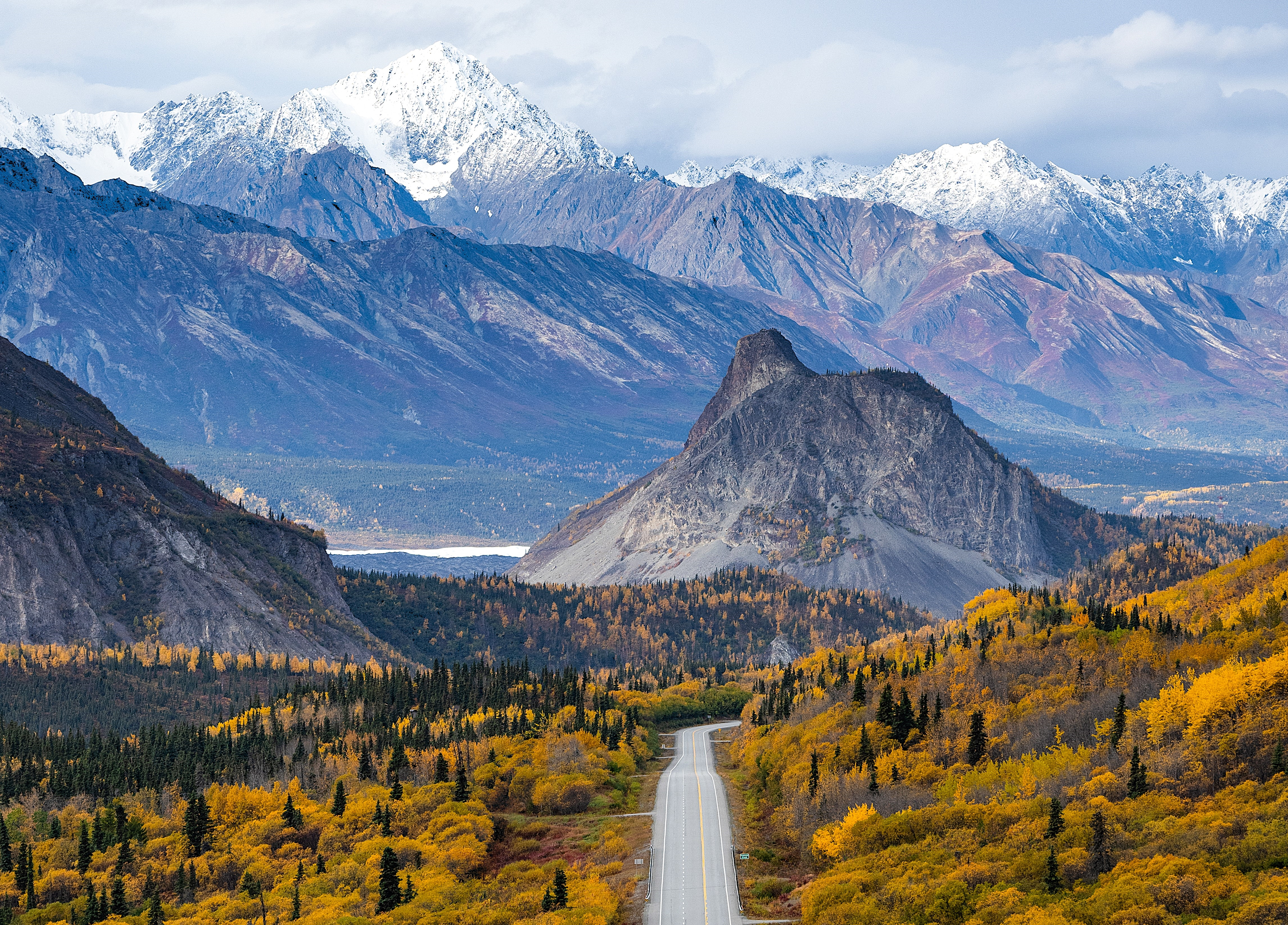
Flying above the Glenn Highway viewing Lion Head and Amulet Peak

North aspect of Lion Head to right

== See also ==
- Geography of Alaska
