= Ice Cream Cone Mountain =

Mountain in Alaska, United States

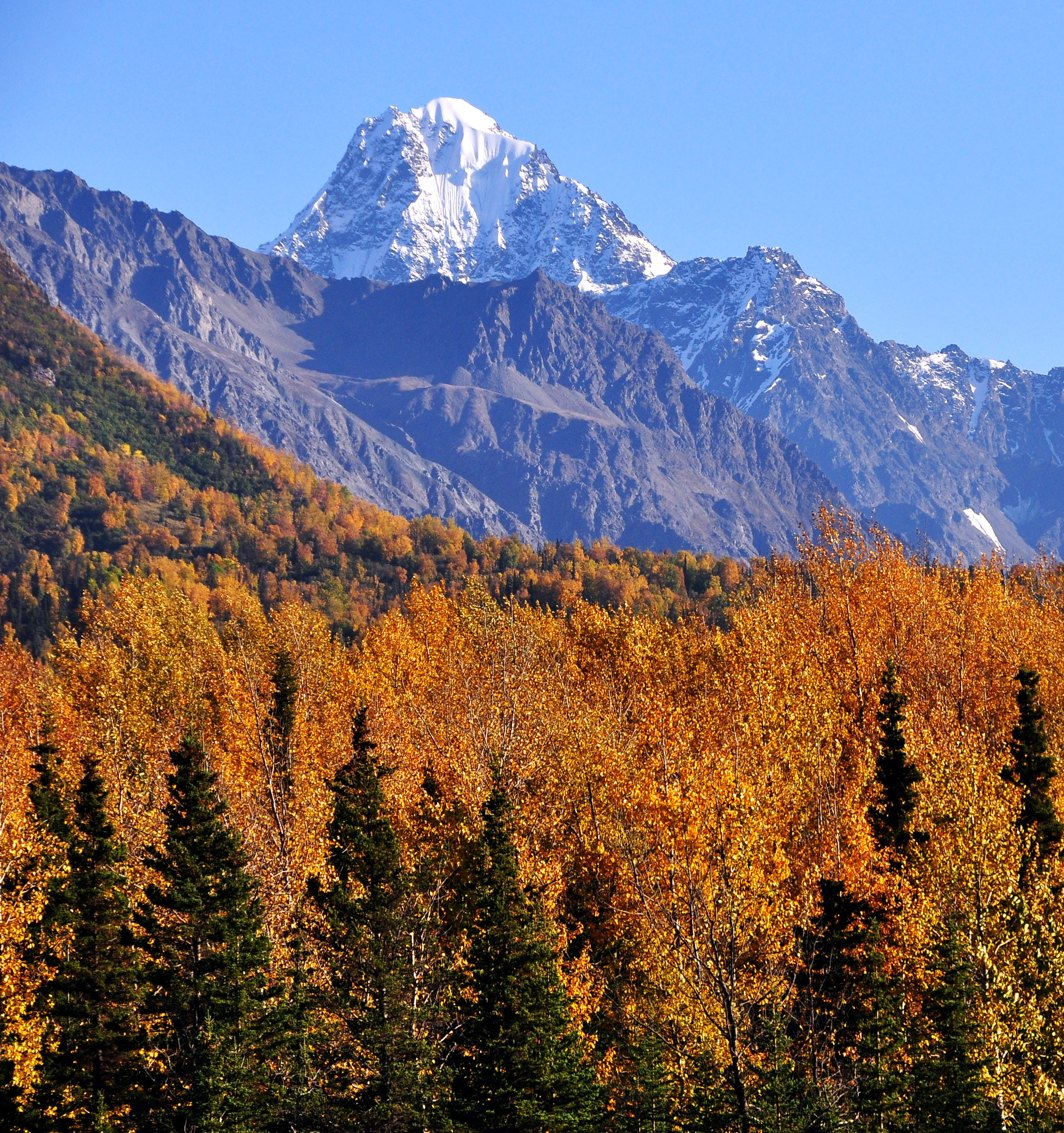
- North aspect, from Glenn Highway

Highest point
- Elevation: 8,675 ft (2,644 m)
- Prominence: 2,825 ft (861 m)
- Parent peak: Peak 8785
- Isolation: 11.78 mi (18.96 km)
- Coordinates: 61°38′08″N 148°28′07″W

Geography
- Location within Alaska
- Country: United States
- State: Alaska
- Borough: Matanuska-Susitna
- Parent range: Chugach Mountains
- Topo map: USGS Anchorage C-4

Climbing
- First ascent: 1967

Ice Cream Cone Mountain is an 8,675-foot-elevation (2,644-meter) mountain summit located 22 miles (35 km) east of Palmer, in the northern Chugach Mountains of Alaska. This peak is visible from the Glenn Highway near Mile 70 west of Kings Mountain. Precipitation runoff from the mountain's north slope drains into Carpenter Creek, a tributary of the Matanuska River, whereas the south slope drains into Metal Creek, a tributary of the Knik River. Topographic relief is significant as the summit rises 5,200 feet (1,585 meters) above Metal Creek in 1.5 mile (2.4 km) and 5,675 feet (1,730 meters) above Carpenter Creek in 1.9 mile (3 km). The first ascent of the summit was made on July 3, 1967, by David P. Johnston, John Samuelson, and Hans Van der Laan via the Northeast Ridge. This mountain's local descriptive toponym has not been officially adopted by the United States Board on Geographic Names, so it is only marked as "8675" on USGS maps. Some climbers in Anchorage call this peak the "Sky Buster" which was the name applied by mountaineer Vin Hoeman.

== Climate ==
Based on the Köppen climate classification, Ice Cream Cone Mountain is located in a subarctic climate zone with long, cold, snowy winters, and mild summers. Weather systems coming off the Gulf of Alaska are forced upwards by the Chugach Mountains (orographic lift), causing heavy precipitation in the form of rainfall and snowfall. Winter temperatures can drop below −20 °C with wind chill factors below −30 °C. This climate supports small unnamed glaciers on its slopes. The months of May through June offer the most favorable weather for climbing or viewing.

== See also ==
- Matanuska Formation
- Geography of Alaska
