= Kings Mountain (Alaska) =

Mountain in Alaska, United States

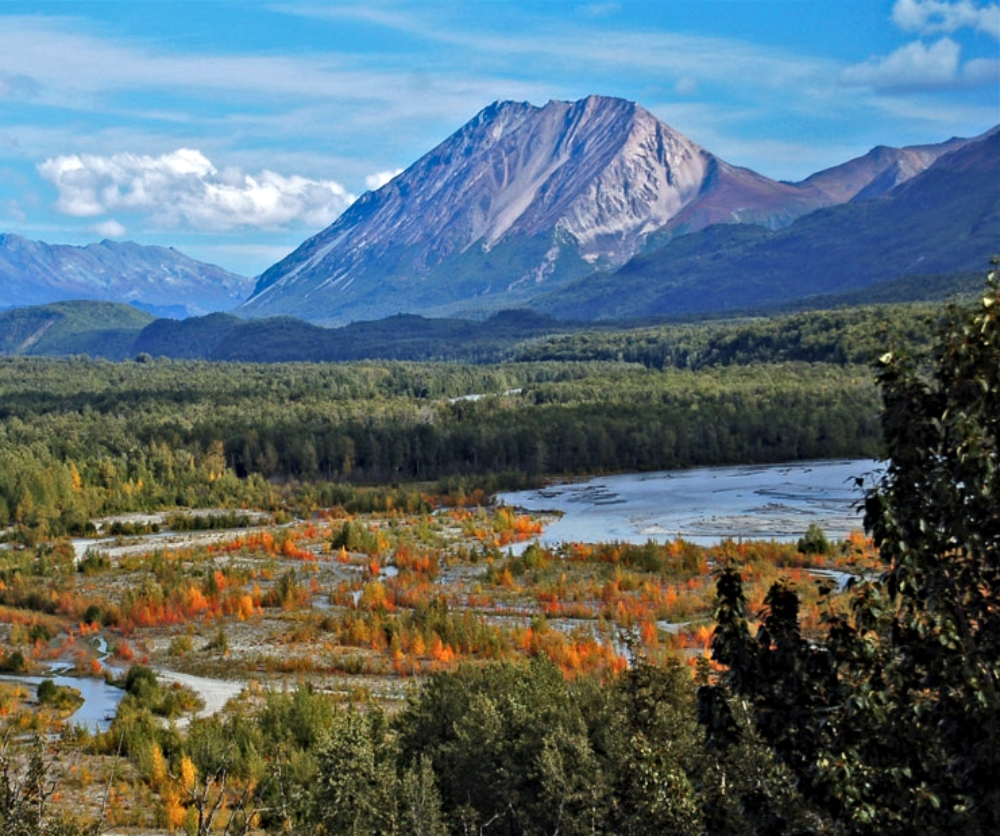
- Kings Mountain from the west

Highest point
- Elevation: 5,809 ft (1,771 m)
- Prominence: 2,009 ft (612 m)
- Isolation: 2.42 mi (3.89 km)
- Coordinates: 61°44′52″N 148°30′36″W

Geography
- Location within Alaska
- Interactive map of Kings Mountain
- Location: Matanuska-Susitna Borough; Alaska, United States
- Parent range: Chugach Mountains
- Topo map: USGS Anchorage C-5

Kings Mountain, also commonly called King Mountain, is a prominent 5,809-foot (1,771 m) elevation mountain summit located 22 mi (35 km) northeast of Palmer, in the northwestern Chugach Mountains of the U.S. state of Alaska. This landmark of the Matanuska Valley is set between Anchorage and Glennallen, at mile 75 of the Glenn Highway. It is situated 18 mi (29 km) west of Amulet Peak, and 12 mi (19 km) east-southeast of Granite Peak. The mountain was named after Al King, a prospector who had a cabin nearby at the confluence of Kings River and Matanuska River. The name was used by prospectors, reported about 1905 by the U.S. Geological Survey, and officially adopted in 1906 by the U.S. Board on Geographic Names. This peak is known as Bashtl'ech' in the Denaʼina language, and Bes Tl'ets' in the Ahtna language, meaning "black stone".

== Climate ==
Based on the Köppen climate classification, Kings Mountain is located in a subarctic climate zone with long, cold, snowy winters, and mild summers. Weather systems coming off the Gulf of Alaska are forced upwards by the Chugach Mountains (orographic lift), causing heavy precipitation in the form of rainfall and snowfall. Temperatures can drop below −20 °C with wind chill factors below −30 °C. The months May through June offer the most favorable weather for climbing or viewing. Precipitation runoff from the mountain drains into tributaries of the Matanuska River.

== Gallery ==
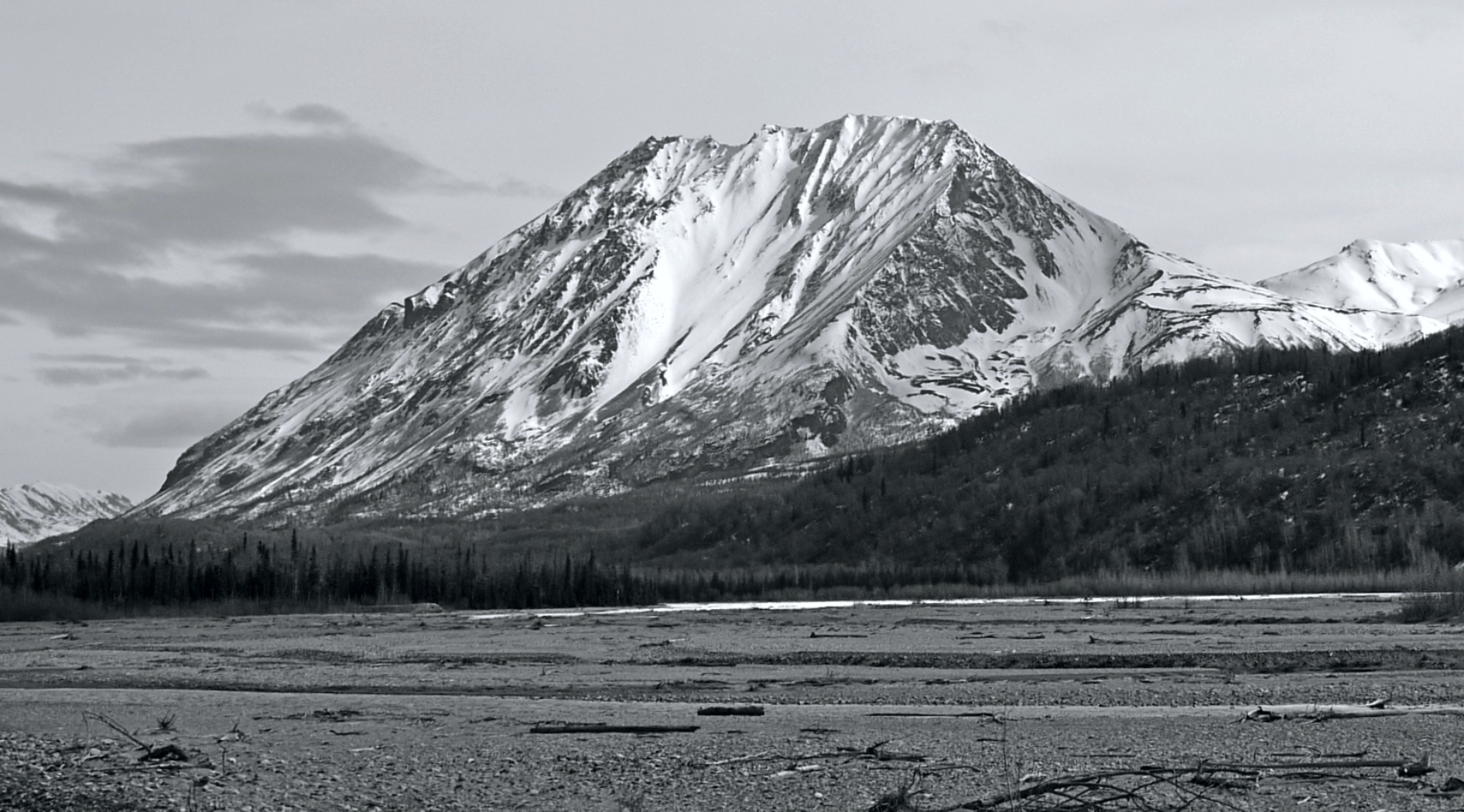

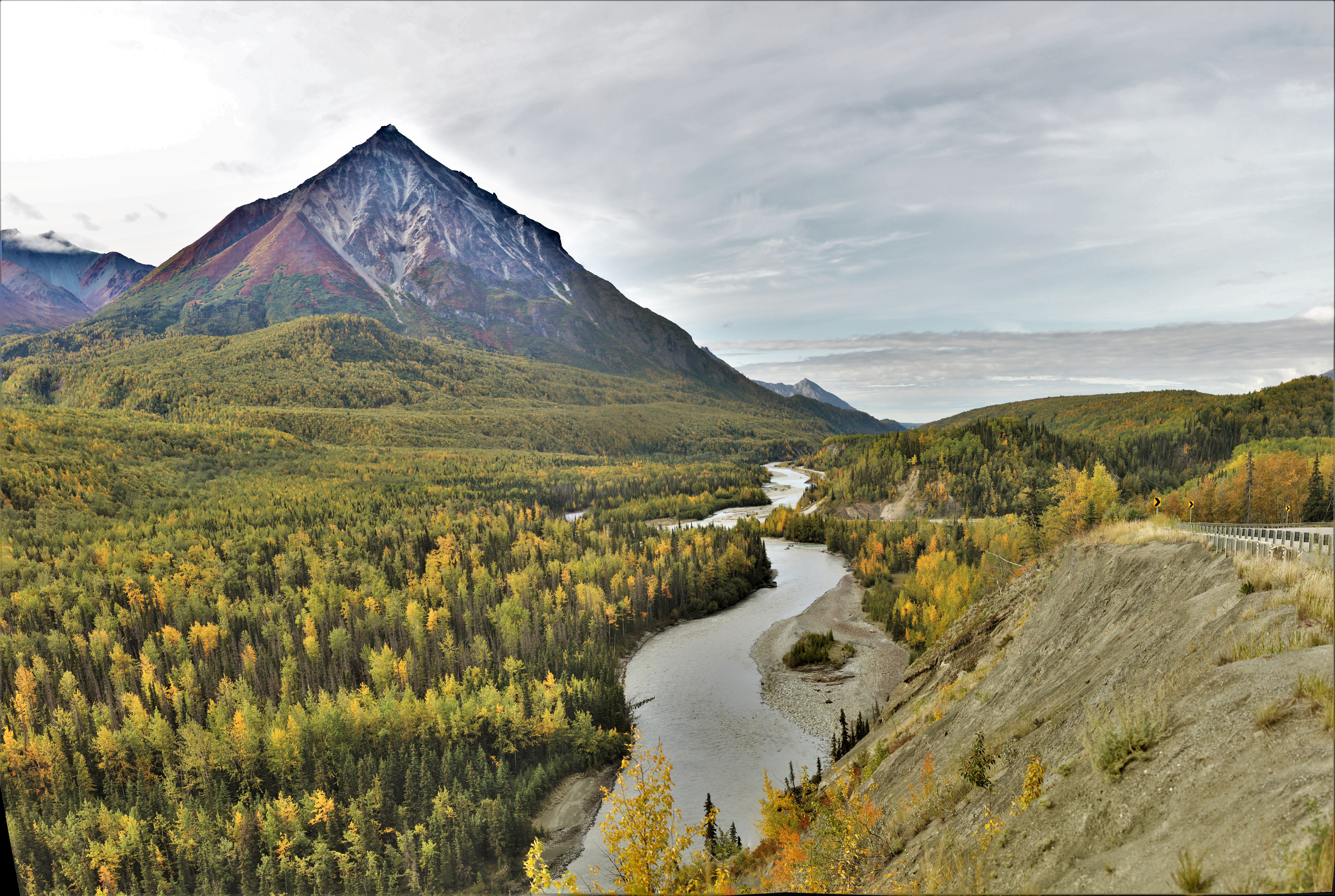
Kings Mountain from the northeast

== See also ==
- Matanuska Formation
- Geography of Alaska
- Ice Cream Cone Mountain
