= Lion's Head =

Lion's Head or Lions Head may refer to:

- Lion's Head (Cape Town), a mountain in Cape Town, South Africa
- Lion's Head, Ontario
- Lion's Head Provincial Park, a provincial park near Lion's Head, Ontario
- Lion's Head (food), a meatball and cabbage dish in Chinese Huaiyang cuisine
- Lion's Head (Benguet), a landmark in the Philippines along Kennon Road leading to Baguio City
- Lionshead, beer brewed by the Lion Brewery, Inc

== See also ==
- Lionhead (disambiguation)
- Lion Rock
