= Mount Wickersham =

Mountain in Alaska, United States

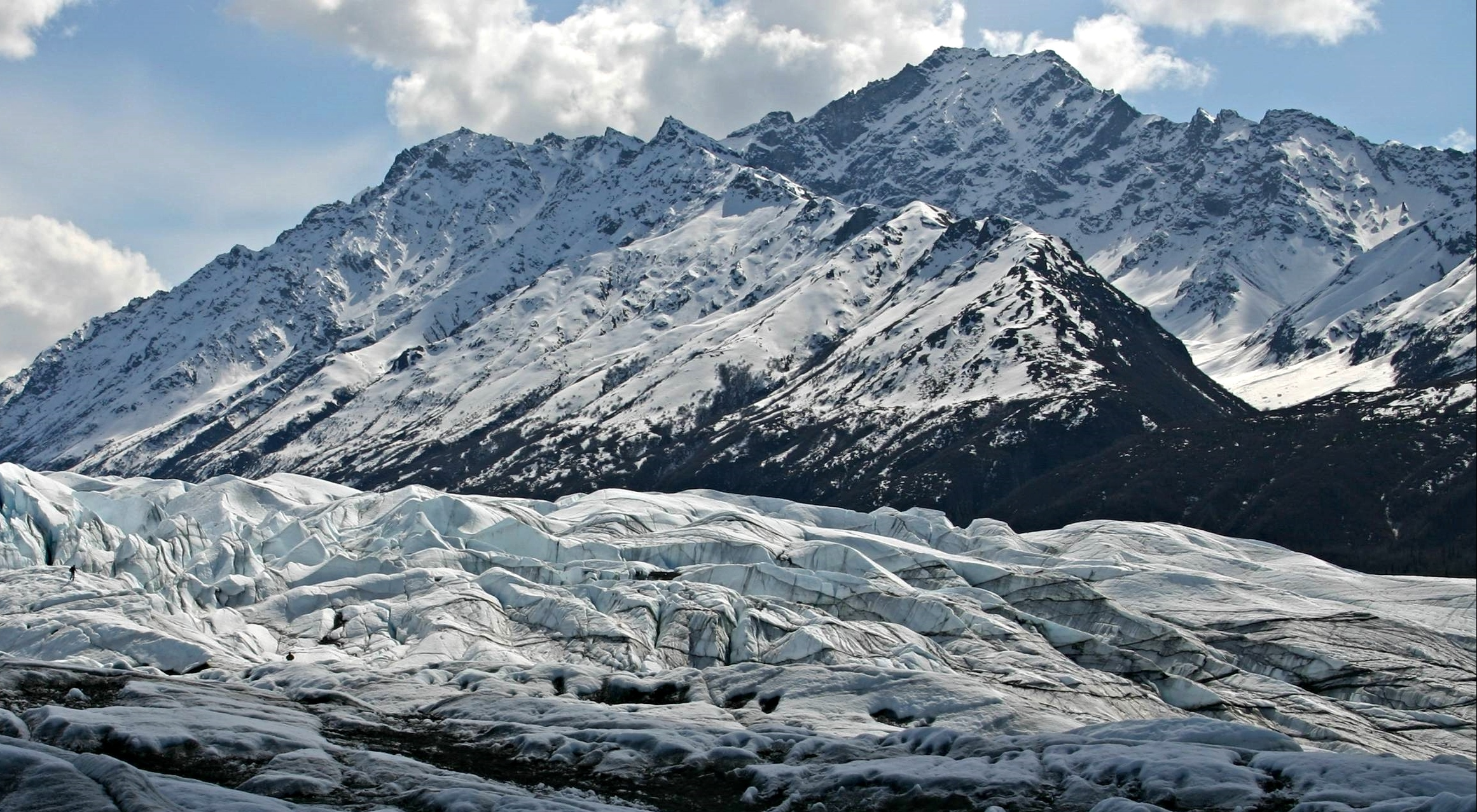
- Mount Wickersham from Matanuska Glacier

Highest point
- Elevation: 7,415 ft (2,260 m)
- Prominence: 1,100 ft (340 m)
- Parent peak: Frogfish Peak (8,530 ft)
- Isolation: 7.87 mi (12.67 km)
- Coordinates: 61°42′28″N 147°42′05″W

Naming
- Etymology: James Wickersham

Geography
- Location within Alaska
- Interactive map of Mount Wickersham
- Location: Matanuska-Susitna Borough; Alaska, United States
- Parent range: Chugach Mountains
- Topo map: USGS Anchorage C-2

Climbing
- First ascent: 1969
- Easiest route: Scrambling

Mount Wickersham is a 7,415-foot (2,260 m) elevation mountain summit located 48 mi (77 km) east of Palmer, in the northern Chugach Mountains of the U.S. state of Alaska. This landmark of the Matanuska Valley is set midway between Anchorage and Glennallen, at mile 101 of the Glenn Highway. It is situated immediately west of Matanuska Glacier, and 10.5 mi (17 km) east of Amulet Peak. The mountain was named in 1960 by Senator Bob Bartlett and Secretary of the Interior Fred A. Seaton, to remember James Wickersham (1857–1939), attorney, District Judge, and Territorial Delegate to Congress from Alaska. In June 1903, Wickersham was also leader of the (unsuccessful) first attempt to climb Denali. His attempt was stymied by steep cliffs which also now bear his name, Wickersham Wall.

== Climate ==
Based on the Köppen climate classification, Mount Wickersham is located in a subarctic climate zone with long, cold, snowy winters, and mild summers. Weather systems coming off the Gulf of Alaska are forced upwards by the Chugach Mountains (orographic lift), causing heavy precipitation in the form of rainfall and snowfall. Winter temperatures can drop below −20 °C with wind chill factors below −30 °C. The months May through June offer the most favorable weather for climbing or viewing Mount Wickersham. Precipitation runoff from the mountain drains into tributaries of the Matanuska River.

== Gallery ==
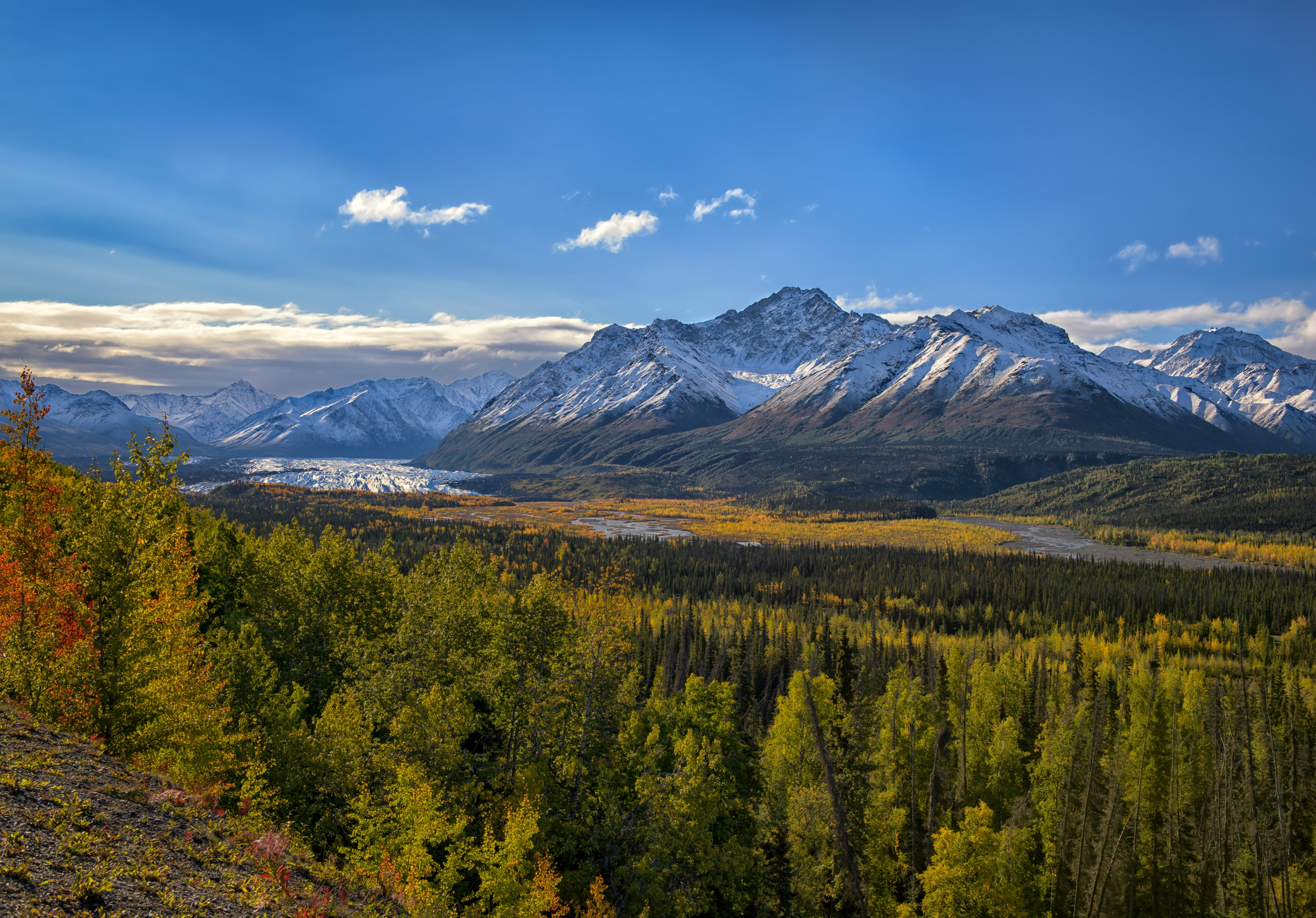
Mount Wickersham

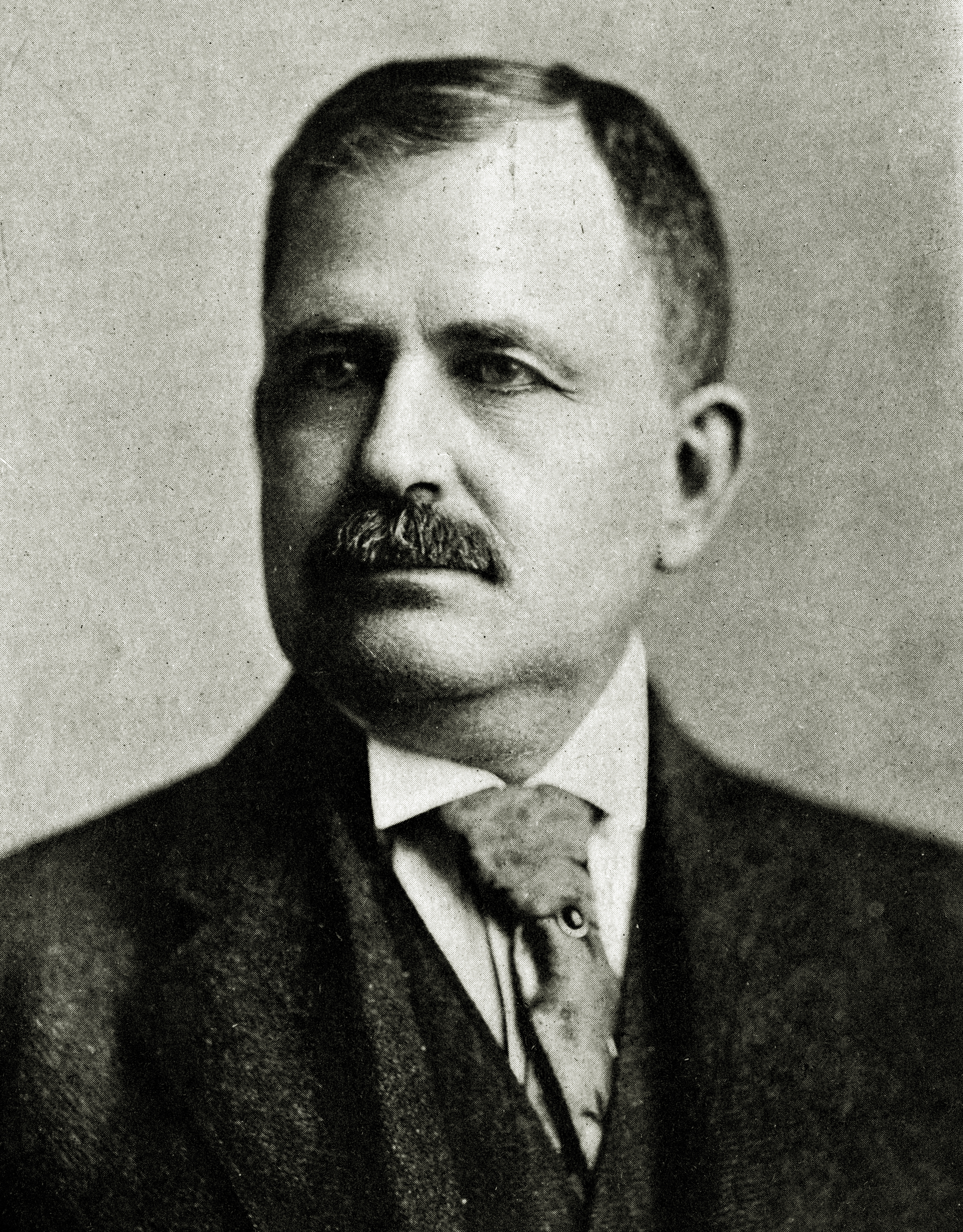
James Wickersham

== See also ==
- Matanuska Formation
- Geography of Alaska
