= Palmer Hay Flats State Game Refuge =

Nature preserve in Alaska, United States

- IUCN category V (protected landscape/seascape)
- Location within Alaska
- Nearest city: Anchorage, Alaska
- Coordinates: 61°32′N 149°21′W
- Area: 22,839 acres (92.43 km^{2})
- Established: 1975
- Governing body: Alaska Department of Natural Resources

The Palmer Hay Flats State Game Refuge is located in Alaska, south of Wasilla and north of Anchorage. It is composed of 28,800 acres (11,655 ha; 45 sq mi) of coastal marshy areas adjacent to Knik Arm that support populations of moose, muskrat, foxes, coyotes, eagles, and migratory waterfowl. In springtime, tens of thousands of migratory geese, swans, shorebirds, and ducks rest and refuel. Many of these stay in the summer. The Knik River, the Matanuska River, Rabbit Slough, Wasilla Creek, Cottonwood Creek, and Spring Creek flow through it.

It is a popular location for hunting, skiing, iceskating, and hiking, and other uses. It is bisected by the Glenn Highway.

It can be accessed at Rabbit Slough, from the Glenn Highway, Nelson Road, Scout Ridge and other locations.

== History ==
An indigenous people called the Knikatnu first settled the land that would become the Palmer Hay Flats State Game Refuge before Alaskan annexation into the United States. The indigenous people left behind a trail that would become the Iditarod Trail. Prior to the 1964 Alaska earthquake, the land was dry grassland. The name of the refuge stems from the hay farming that went on before the earthquake.
