= Amulet Peak =

Mountain in Alaska, USA

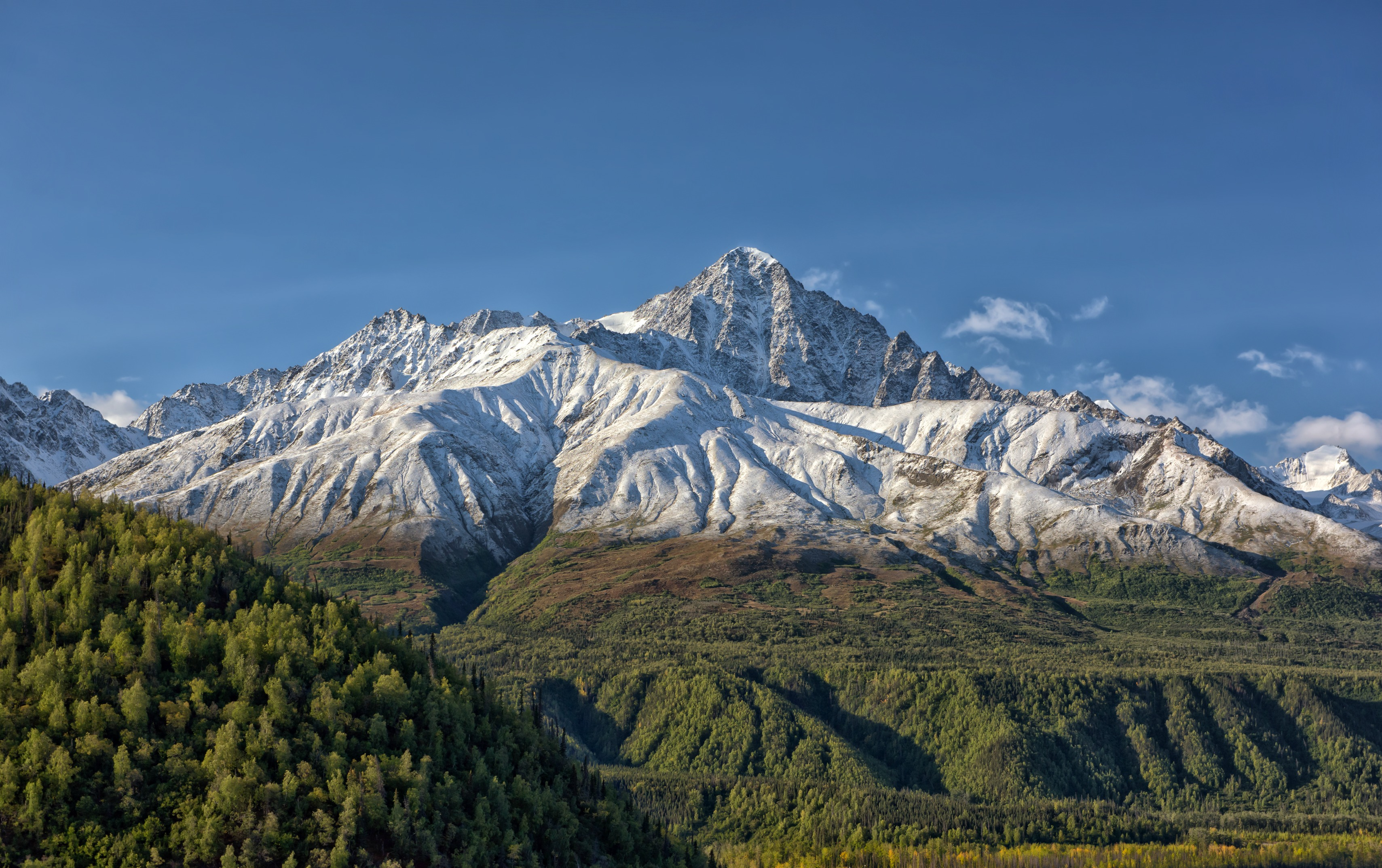
- North face featured, from Glenn Highway

Highest point
- Elevation: 8,290 ft (2,530 m)
- Prominence: 1,870 ft (570 m)
- Parent peak: Awesome Peak
- Isolation: 3.33 mi (5.36 km)
- Coordinates: 61°42′30″N 148°01′57″W

Geography
- Location within Alaska
- Interactive map of Amulet Peak
- Location: Matanuska-Susitna Borough; Alaska, United States
- Parent range: Chugach Mountains
- Topo map: USGS Anchorage C-3

Climbing
- First ascent: 1968
- Easiest route: South ridge

Amulet Peak is a prominent 8,290-foot (2,527 m) elevation mountain summit located 39 mi (63 km) east-northeast of Palmer, in the northern Chugach Mountains of the U.S. state of Alaska. This landmark of the Matanuska Valley is set midway between Anchorage and Glennallen, at mile 94 of the Glenn Highway. It is situated 12 mi (19 km) west of Matanuska Glacier, and 3.7 mi (6 km) northeast of Awesome Peak, its nearest higher neighbor. Established climbing routes on this peak include the east and south ridges, as well as the north face which is the most difficult and dangerous. The first ascent of this peak was made in 1968 by John Vincent Hoeman, his wife Grace Hoeman, and William Babcock, via the south ridge.

== Climate ==
Based on the Köppen climate classification, Amulet Peak is located in a subarctic climate zone with long, cold, snowy winters, and mild summers. Weather systems coming off the Gulf of Alaska are forced upwards by the Chugach Mountains (orographic lift), causing heavy precipitation in the form of rainfall and snowfall. Temperatures can drop below −20 °C with wind chill factors below −30 °C. This climate supports small unnamed glaciers and permanent snowfields on its slopes. The months May through June offer the most favorable weather for climbing or viewing. Precipitation runoff from the mountain drains into Monument and Gravel Creeks, which are tributaries of the Matanuska River.

== Gallery ==
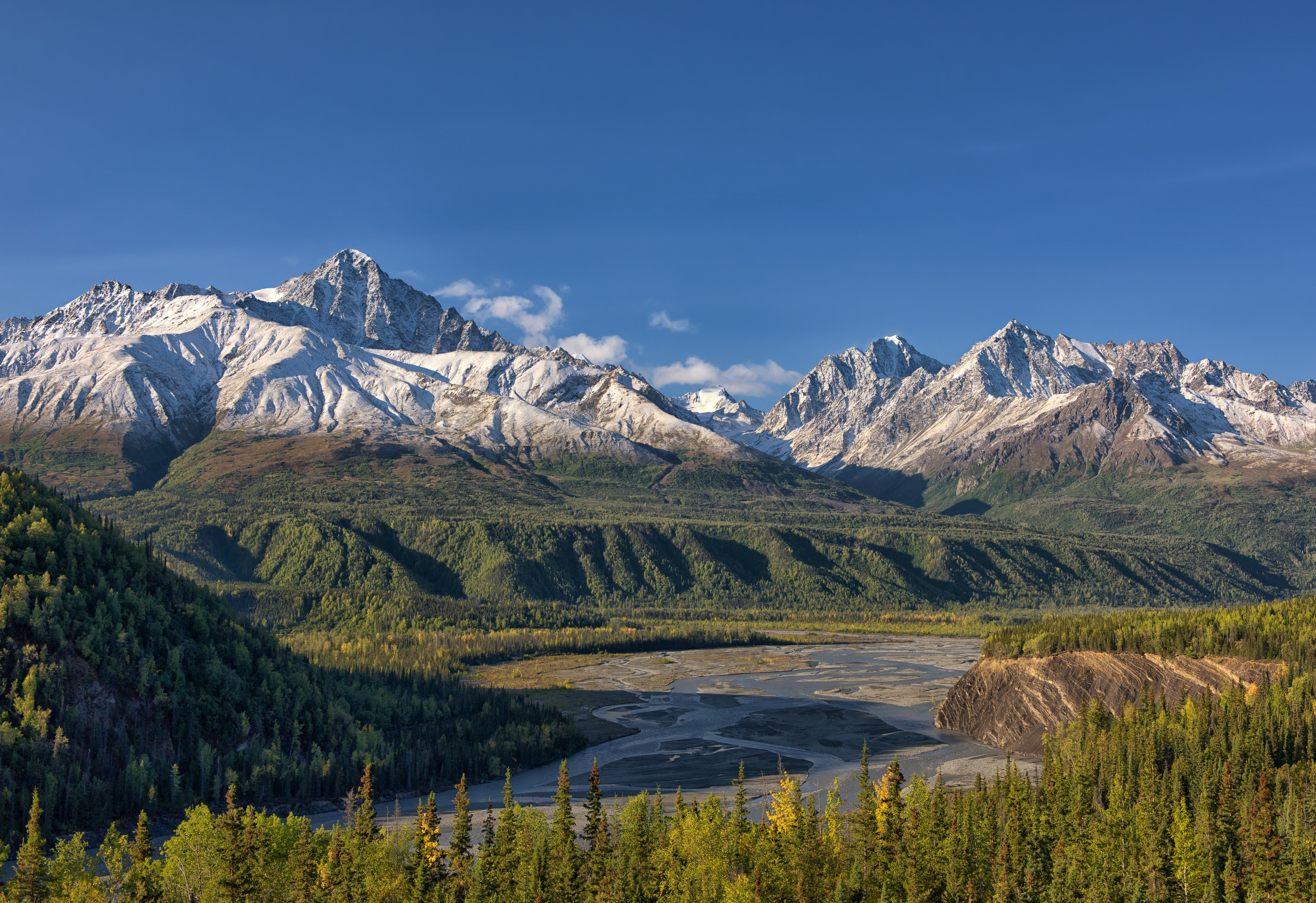
Amulet Peak (left) rising above Matanuska River, with parent Awesome Peak to right of center

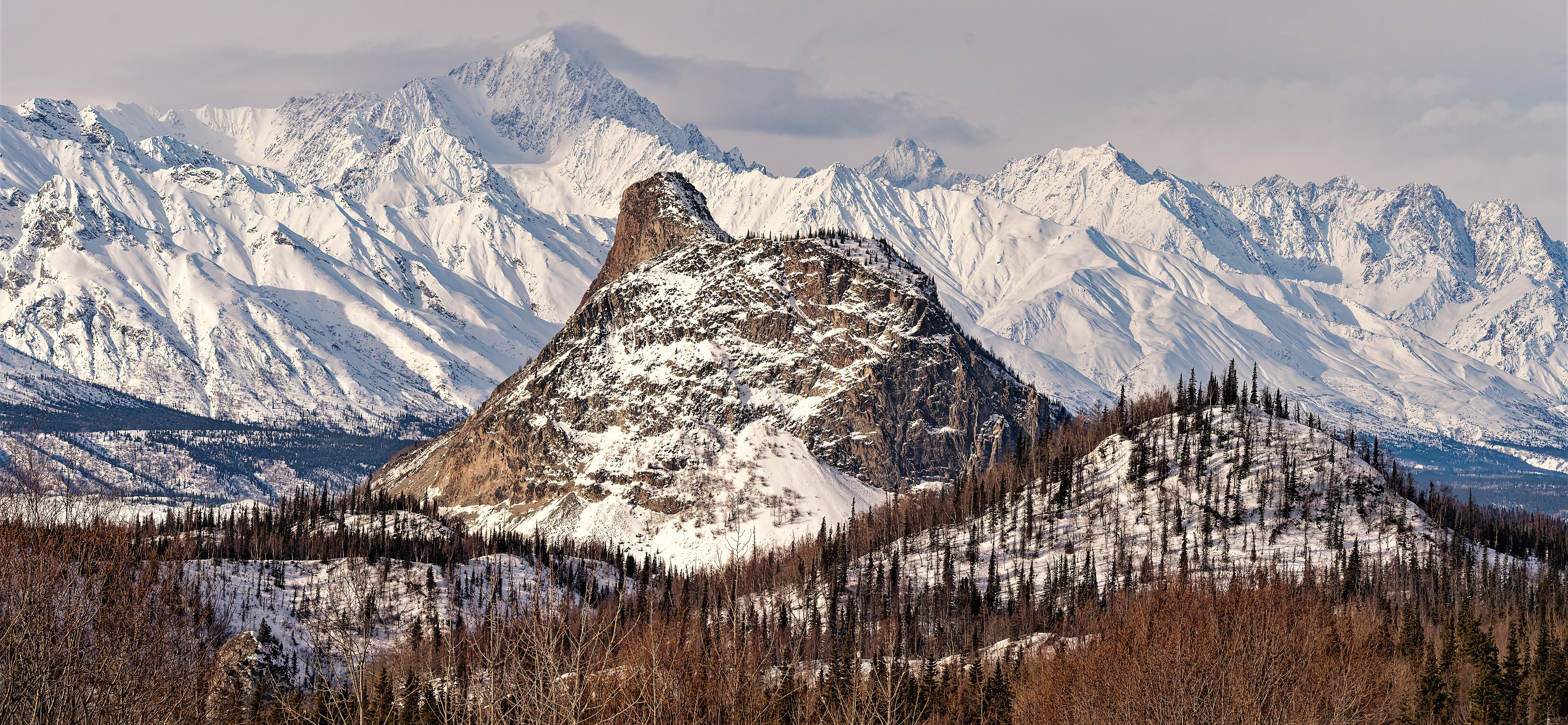
Amulet Peak in background behind Lion Head

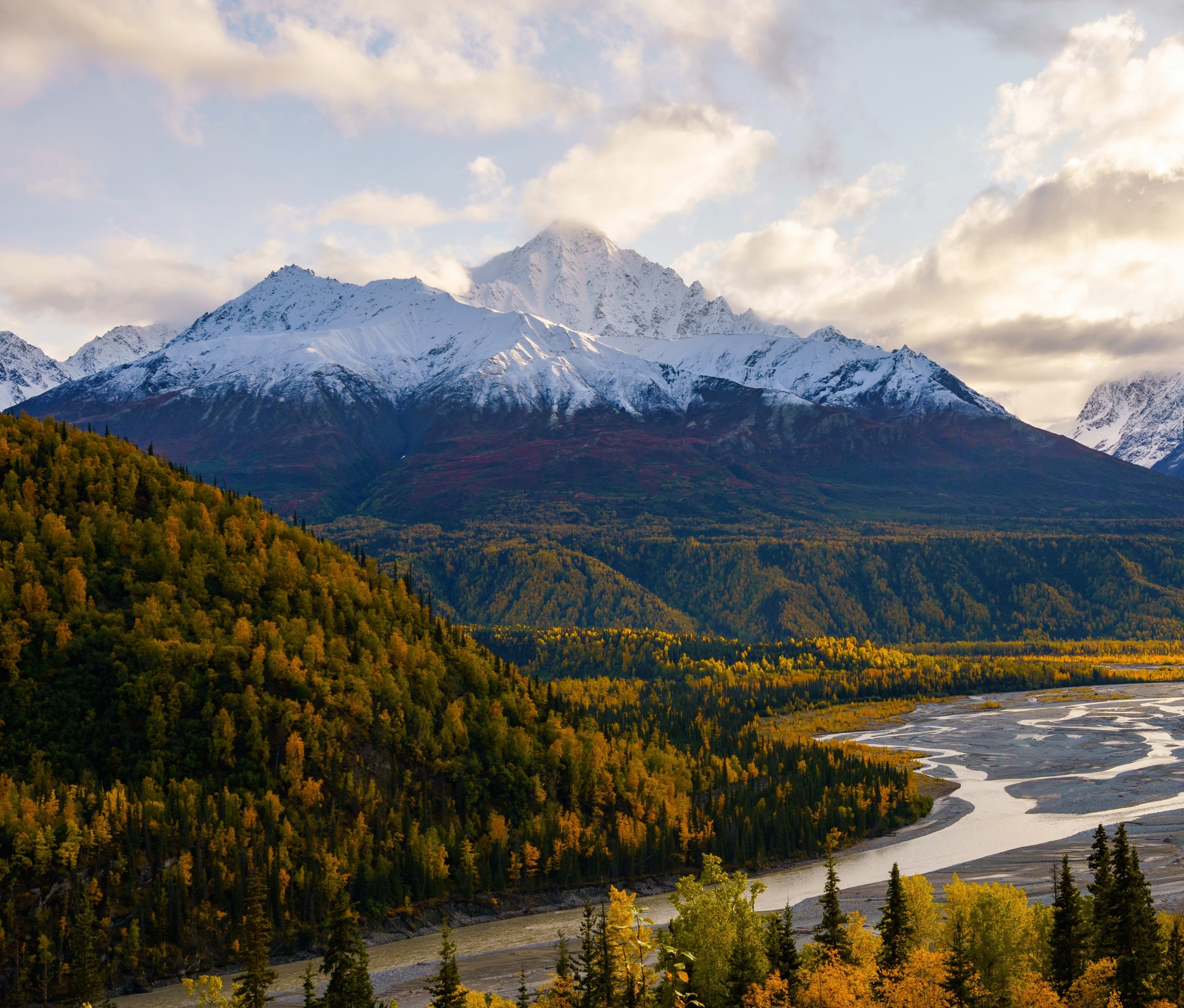

== See also ==
- Matanuska Formation
- Geography of Alaska
