= Matanuska Glacier =

Valley glacier in the US state of Alaska

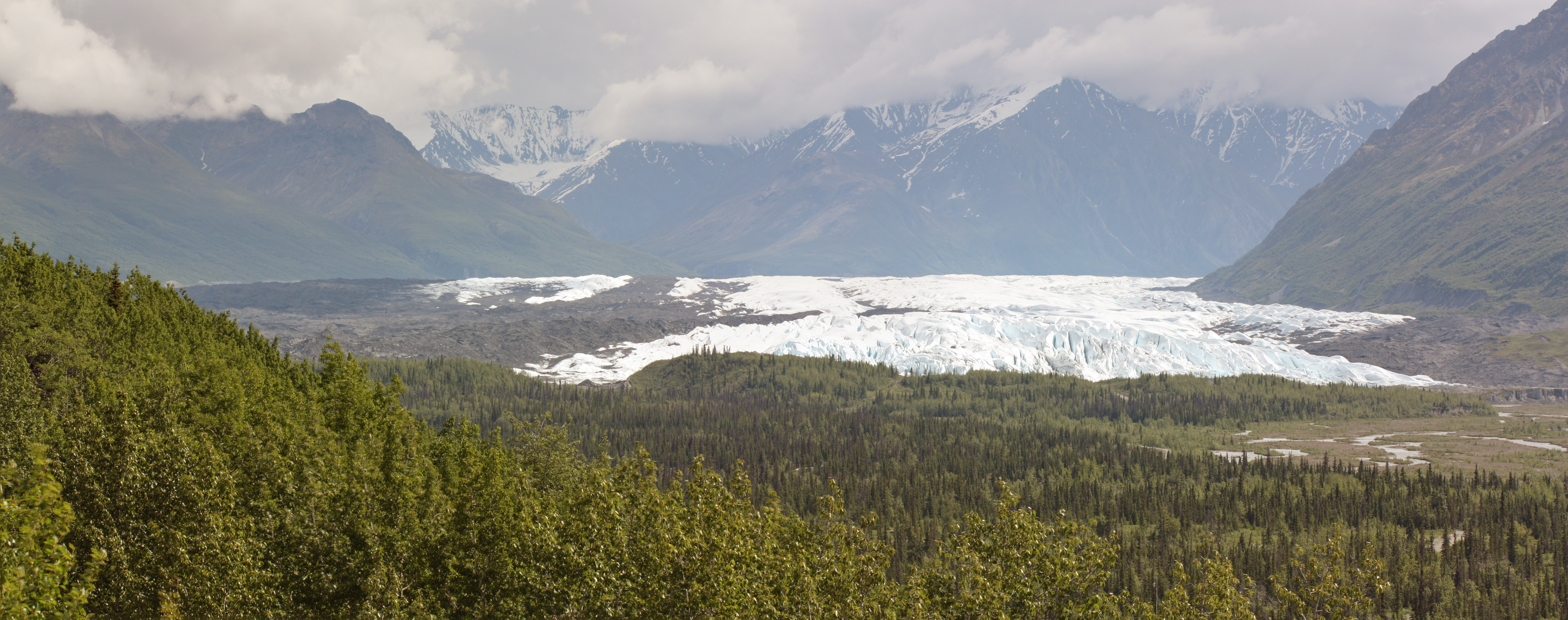
- Matanuska Glacier

- Location within Alaska
- Interactive map of Matanuska Glacier
- Type: Mountain glacier
- Location: Matanuska-Susitna Borough, Alaska, U.S.
- Coordinates: 61°39′21″N 147°34′52″W
- Length: 27 miles (43 km)
- Terminus: Matanuska River
- Status: Retreating

Matanuska Glacier is a valley glacier in the US state of Alaska. At 27 miles (43 km) long by 4 miles (6.4 km) wide, it is the largest glacier accessible by car in the United States. Its terminus feeds the Matanuska River. It lies near the Glenn Highway about 100 miles (160 km) northeast of Anchorage in Glacier View. The glacier flows about 1 foot (30 cm) per day. Due to ablation of the lower glacier, as of 2007, the location of the glacier terminus has changed little over the previous three decades.

== Ownership and access ==
The glacier is located in Matanuska Glacier State Recreation Site, an Alaska State Park with trails and a small campground. Although the park is public, a private entity affiliated with Cook Inlet Region, Inc. charges a toll on the only bridge connecting the park to Alaska Route 1.

== Name ==
The glacier is the eponym of the Alaska Marine Highway ferry MV Matanuska.

== Gallery ==
Matanuska Glacier
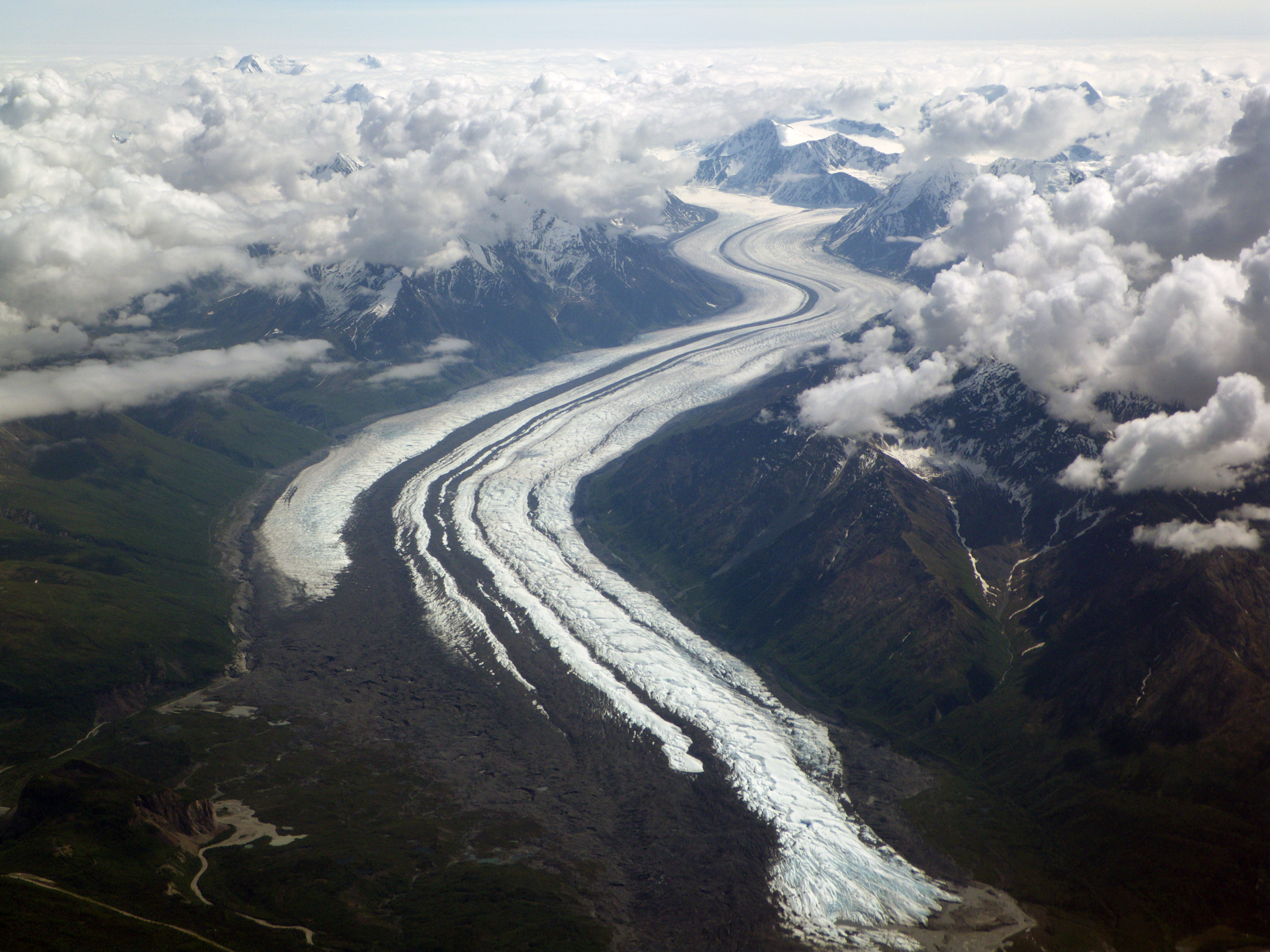
Matanuska Glacier from 20,000 feet (6,100 m)

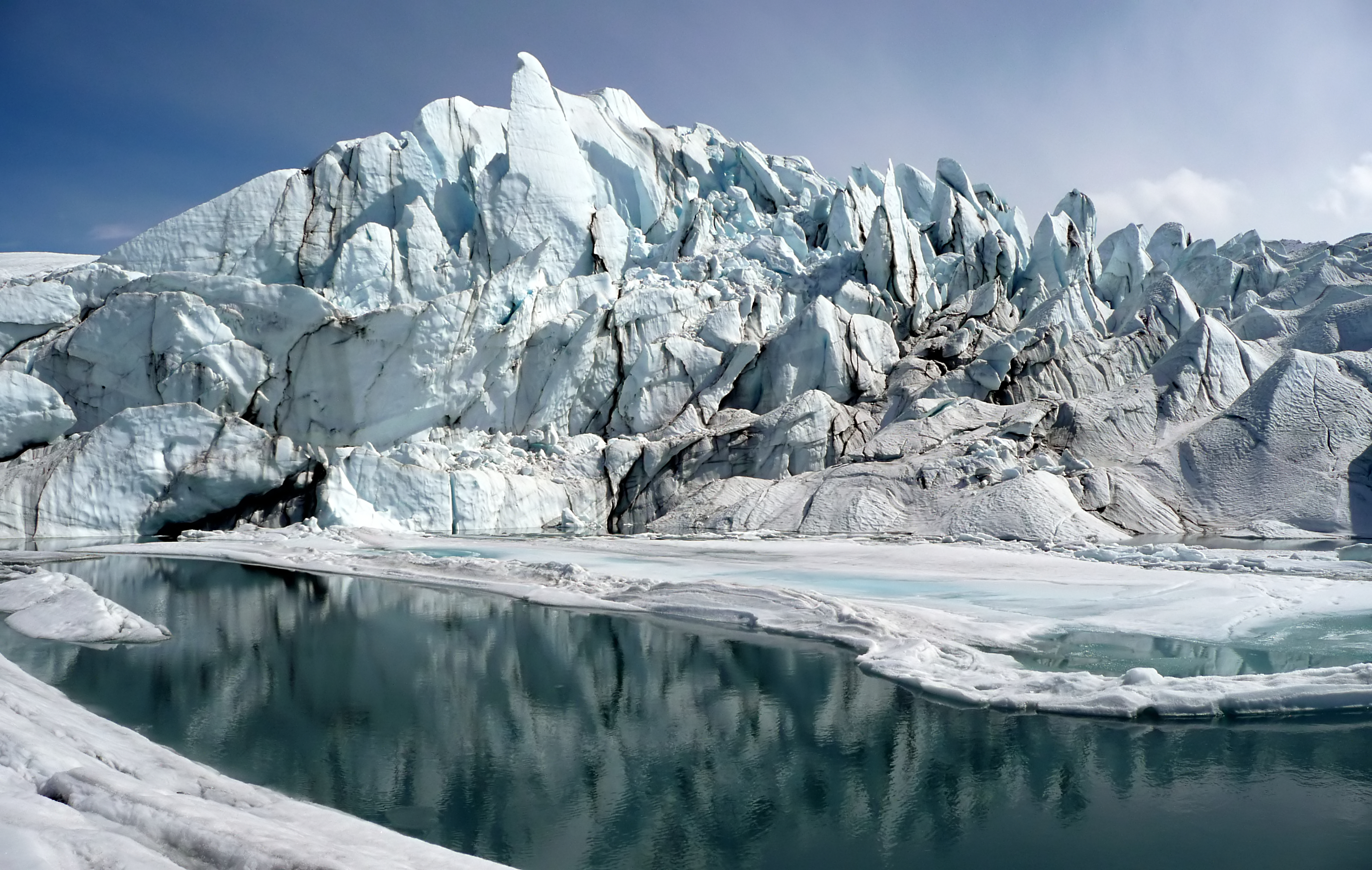
Matanuska Glacier terminus

== See also ==
- Matanuska Formation
- Glacier National Park
- List of glaciers
