= Matanuska River =

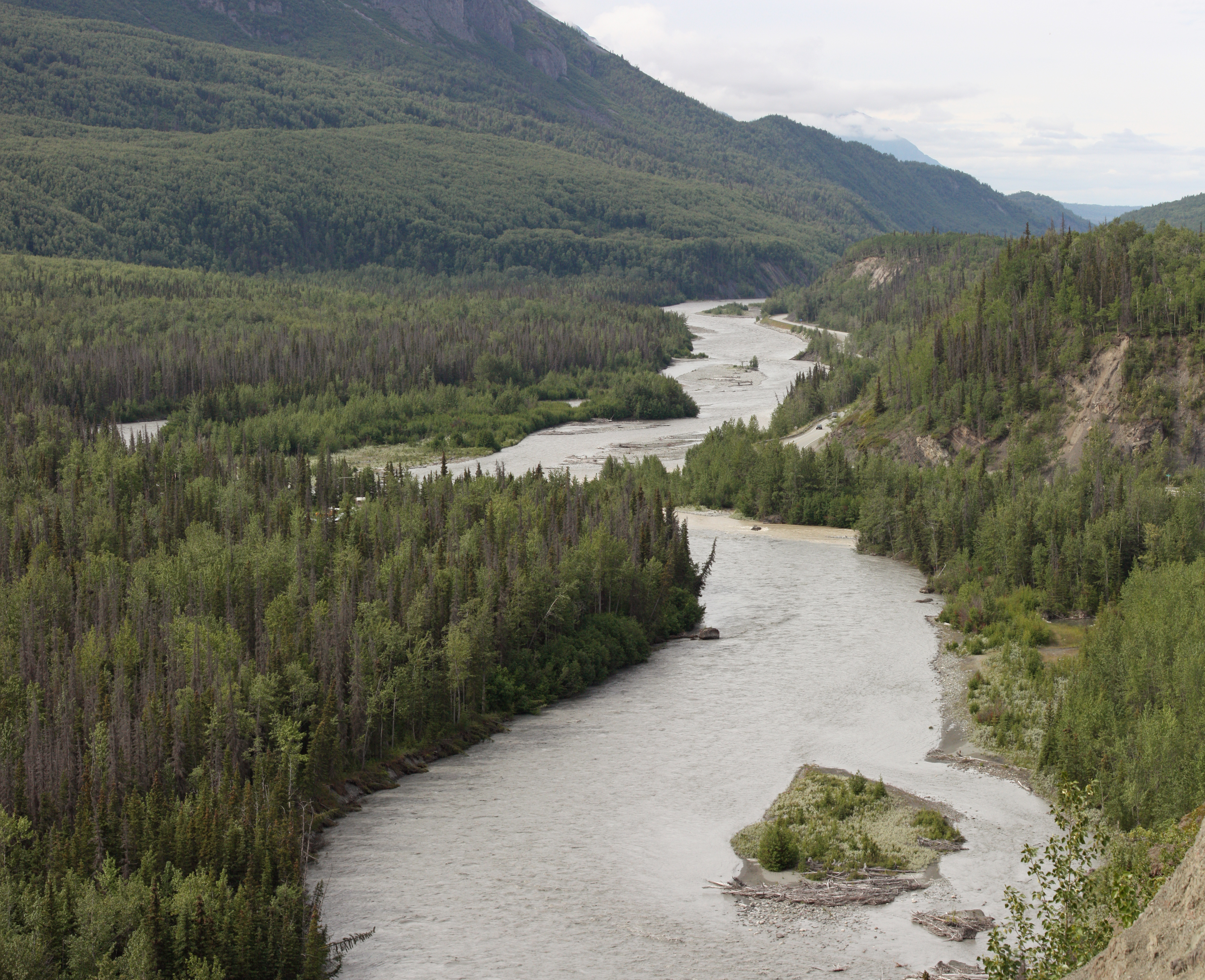
- Silt-laden waters of the Chickaloon River (right center) enter the Matanuska River at mile 76 (km 123) of the Glenn Highway (upper right), a major highway connecting Anchorage to the rest of the state. The valley is forested with black cottonwood, balsam poplar, white spruce and paper birch.

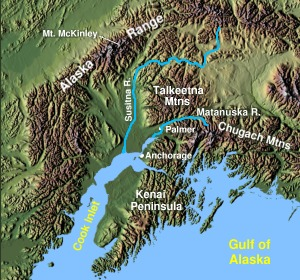
- South-central Alaska, near Anchorage

- Location of the mouth of the Matanuska River in Alaska
- Native name: Ch'atanhtnu (Denaʼina)

Location
- Country: United States
- State: Alaska
- Borough: Matanuska-Susitna

Physical characteristics
- Source: confluence of the river's east and south forks
  - coordinates: 61°47′27″N 147°29′07″W
  - elevation: 2,033 ft (620 m)
- Mouth: Knik Arm, Cook Inlet
  - location: 9.5 miles (15.3 km) southwest of Palmer
  - coordinates: 61°29′49″N 149°16′11″W
  - elevation: 0 ft (0 m)
- Length: 75 mi (121 km)
- Basin size: 2,100 sq mi (5,400 km^{2})
- Discharge
  - location: Palmer
  - average: 3,875 cu ft/s (109.7 m^{3}/s)
  - minimum: 234 cu ft/s (6.6 m^{3}/s)
  - maximum: 82,100 cu ft/s (2,320 m^{3}/s)

The Matanuska River (Dena'ina: Ch'atanhtnu; Ahtna: Ts'itonhna’) is a 75-mile (121 km) long river in Southcentral Alaska, United States. The river drains a broad valley south of the Alaska Range eponymously known as the Matanuska Valley.

== Course ==
Formed by the confluence of its east and south forks, the Matanuska River flows generally southwest to the Knik Arm of Cook Inlet. Downstream of its source, the river is joined by meltwater from Matanuska Glacier in the northern Chugach Mountains. From there it continues through the Matanuska Valley, between the Chugach Mountains to the south and the Talkeetna Mountains to the north. Population centers along its course include Chickaloon, Sutton, Palmer, and Butte. It enters the Knik Arm of Cook Inlet about 9.5 miles (15.3 km) southwest of Palmer and about 25 miles (40 km) northeast of Anchorage.

The Glenn Highway runs roughly parallel to the river for much of its length. Highway bridges over the river, listed from source to mouth, include Glacier Park Bridge, Chickaloon River Bridge, King River Bridge, Old Glenn Highway Bridge, and Glenn Highway Bridge. An Alaska Railroad bridge crosses the river parallel to the Glenn Highway Bridge at Palmer Hay Flats State Game Refuge. Matanuska Glacier State Recreation Site, an Alaska State Park with trails and a small campground, is along the highway where Glacier Creek enters the river; King Mountain State Recreation Site is near Chickaloon; and Kepler – Bradley Lakes State Recreation Area is near Palmer.

In addition to the glacier, named and unnamed streams that drain the Talkeetna and Chugach ranges feed into the river. These include Glacier, Hicks, Purinton, Caribou, and Coal creeks, and the Chickaloon and King rivers, and many others. The main stem is silty with glacial run-off from spring through fall but at lower flows beneath winter ice, it runs relatively clear.

The Matanuska Valley is one of the most settled regions of Alaska and one of the few areas in the state to support agriculture. Erosion by the glacial braided river has damaged roads, farms, and houses for decades.

=== Discharge ===
The United States Geological Survey operates a stream gauge near Palmer. Mean monthly discharge at this gauge varies from 500 cubic feet per second (14 m^{3}/s) in March to 13,000 cubic feet per second (370 m^{3}/s) in July. The maximum recorded flow was 82,100 cubic feet per second (2,320 m^{3}/s) on August 10, 1971, after the break-out of a natural reservoir on Granite Creek. The minimum recorded flow of 234 cubic feet per second (6.6 m^{3}/s) occurred on April 25, 1956.

== Boating ==
The river is a popular destination for whitewater enthusiasts who float mainly in rafts or kayaks. Accessible at several bridges and other points along the Glenn Highway, the Matanuska varies from Class II (medium) to III (difficult) on the International Scale of River Difficulty. Expert paddlers sometimes run a tributary, Caribou Creek, that flows past Matanuska Glacier and is rated Class II to IV (very difficult). Hazards along the main stem include swift, cold water; big standing waves and holes along some sections; overhanging or submerged vegetation on the lower reaches, and upriver winds.

== Etymology ==
The indigenous Dena'ina Athabascan name for the river is Ch'atanhtnu, based on the root -tanh "trail extends out", meaning literally "trail comes out river". The English place name Matanuska derives from a Russian term spelled in various ways, including "Matanooski" and "Mednoviska", and meaning "copper river people", perhaps referring to an implied route from Cook Inlet to the Copper River.

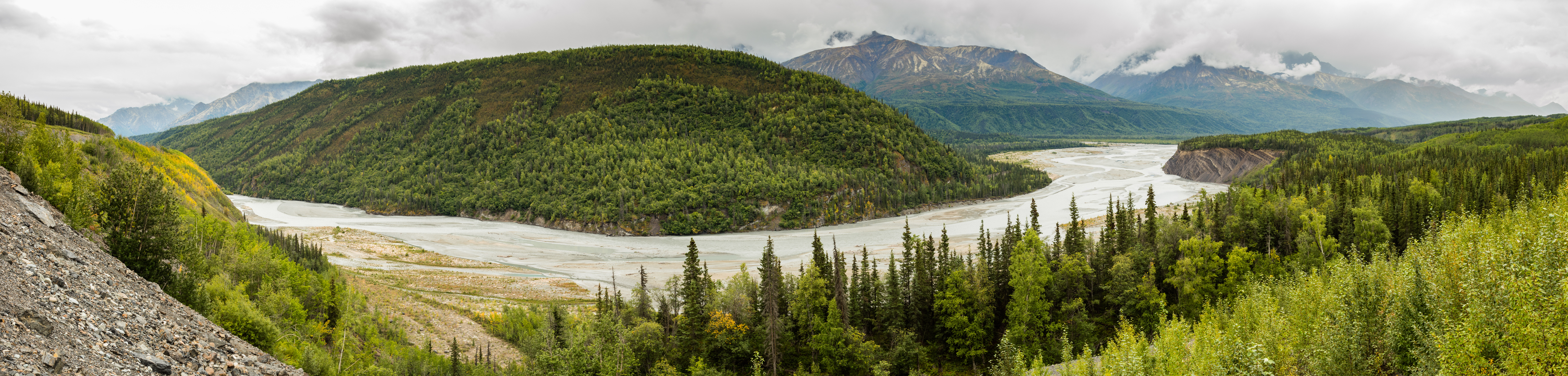
Panoramic view of the Matanuska River near Palmer

== See also ==
- List of rivers of Alaska
- Matanuska Formation
