= Bear Creek, Alaska =

- Census-designated place
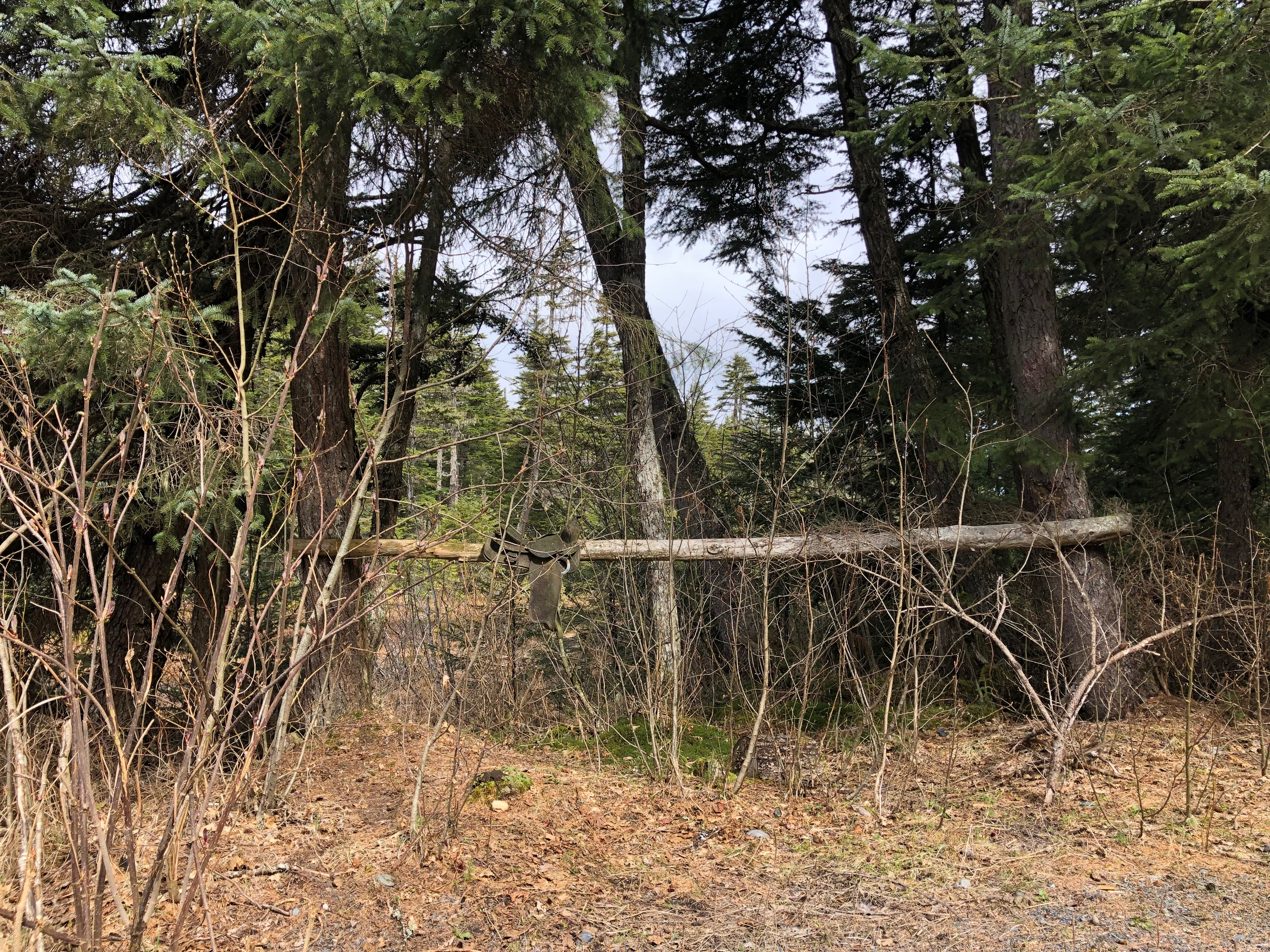
- A saddle on a hitching post in Bear Creek CDP

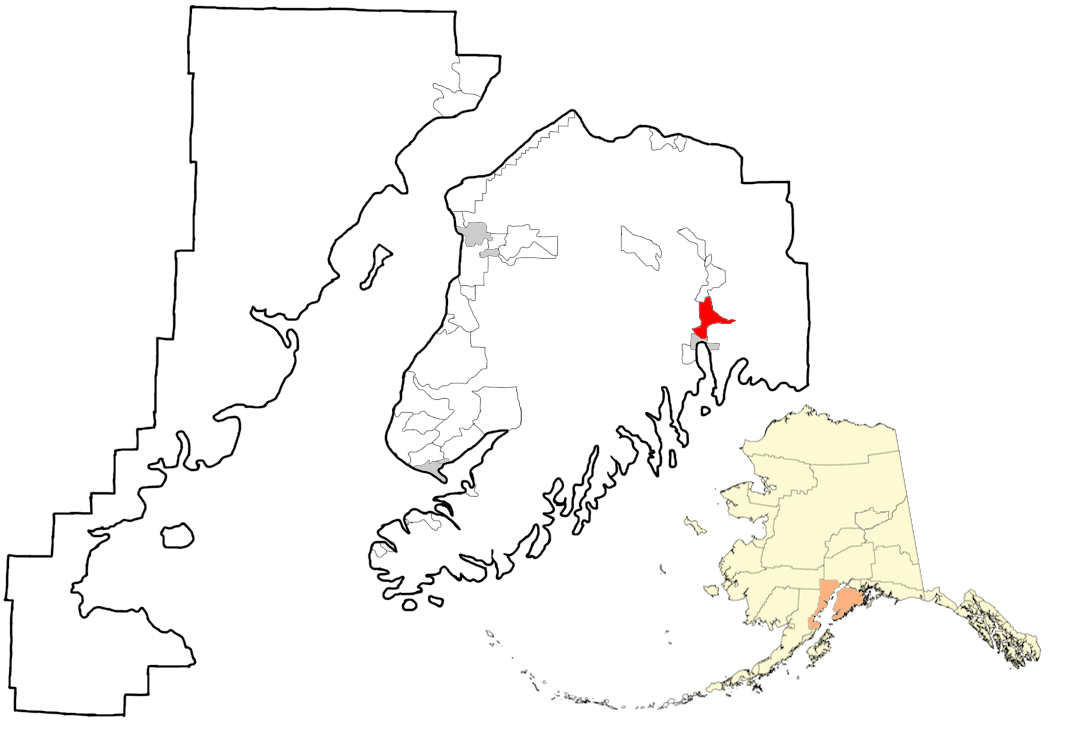
- Location in Kenai Peninsula Borough, Alaska
- Coordinates: 60°10′34″N 149°23′42″W
- Country: United States
- State: Alaska
- Borough: Kenai Peninsula

Government
  - Borough mayor: Peter Micciche
  - State senator: Jesse Bjorkman (R)
  - State rep.: Ben Carpenter (R)

Area
  - Total: 39.59 sq mi (102.55 km^{2})
  - Land: 38.33 sq mi (99.28 km^{2})
  - Water: 1.26 sq mi (3.26 km^{2})
- Elevation: 138 ft (42 m)

Population (2020)
  - Total: 2,129
  - Density: 55.5/sq mi (21.44/km^{2})
- Time zone: UTC-9 (Alaska (AKST))
  - Summer (DST): UTC-8 (AKDT)
- ZIP code: 99664
- Area code: 907
- FIPS code: 02-05585
- GNIS feature ID: 1865547

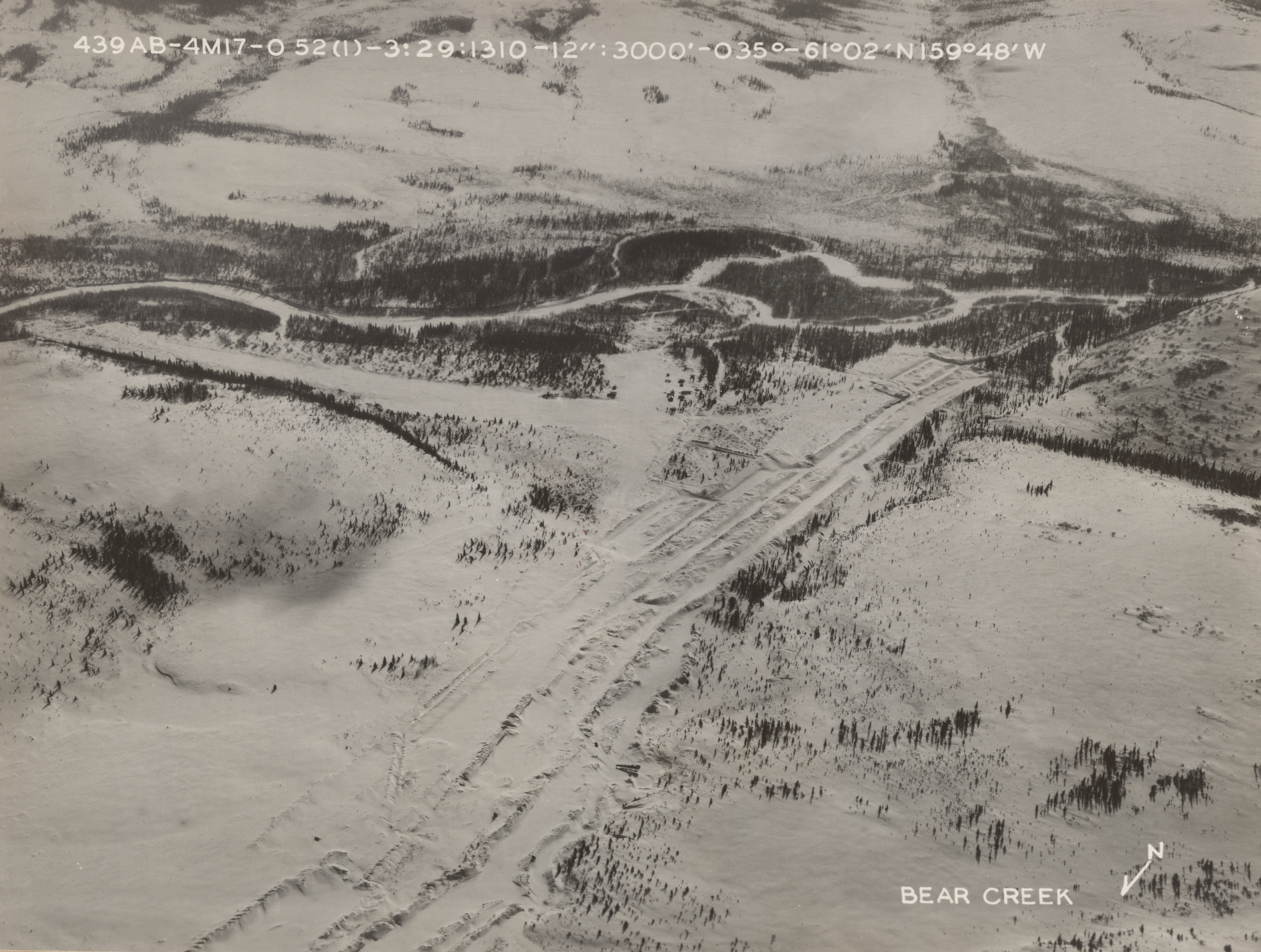
Bear Creek Landing Field in 1944

Bear Creek is a census-designated place (CDP) in Kenai Peninsula Borough, Alaska, United States. At the 2020 census the population was 2,129 up from 1,956 in 2010. Bear Creek is a few miles north of Seward near the stream of the same name and its source, Bear Lake.

== Geography ==
Bear Creek is located at 60°10′34″N 149°23′42″W (60.176060, -149.395066). It is bordered to the south by the city of Seward and to the north by Primrose. The CDP includes the unincorporated community of Woodrow, located at the south end of Bear Lake.

Alaska Route 9, the Seward Highway, runs the length of the Bear Creek community, leading south 4 miles (6 km) to the center of Seward and north 31 miles (50 km) to Alaska Route 1 at Tern Lake. Anchorage is 122 miles (196 km) north of Bear Creek.

According to the United States Census Bureau, the CDP has a total area of 39.5 square miles (102.2 km^{2}), of which 38.2 square miles (99.0 km^{2}) are land and 1.3 square miles (3.3 km^{2}), or 3.21%, are water. The southern border of the CDP is the Resurrection River to its outlet in Resurrection Bay. Bear Lake is in the center, draining south to the Resurrection. The CDP is bordered to the northeast by the South Fork of the Snow River, which flows north to Kenai Lake and is part of the Kenai River watershed flowing west to Cook Inlet.

== Demographics ==
Historical population
| Census | Pop. | Note | %± |
|---|---|---|---|
| 2000 | 1,748 | | — |
| 2010 | 1,956 | | 11.9% |
| 2020 | 2,129 | | 8.8% |
U.S. Decennial Census

Bear Creek first appeared on the 2000 U.S. Census as a census-designated place (CDP).

=== 2020 census ===
As of the 2020 census, Bear Creek had a population of 2,129. The median age was 41.0 years. 22.1% of residents were under the age of 18 and 13.5% of residents were 65 years of age or older. For every 100 females there were 108.9 males, and for every 100 females age 18 and over there were 116.0 males age 18 and over.

0.0% of residents lived in urban areas, while 100.0% lived in rural areas.

There were 857 households in Bear Creek, of which 28.9% had children under the age of 18 living in them. Of all households, 50.5% were married-couple households, 23.3% were households with a male householder and no spouse or partner present, and 16.9% were households with a female householder and no spouse or partner present. About 26.6% of all households were made up of individuals and 8.1% had someone living alone who was 65 years of age or older.

There were 1,067 housing units, of which 19.7% were vacant. The homeowner vacancy rate was 1.2% and the rental vacancy rate was 7.0%.

Racial composition as of the 2020 census
| Race | Number | Percent |
|---|---|---|
| White | 1,660 | 78.0% |
| Black or African American | 10 | 0.5% |
| American Indian and Alaska Native | 142 | 6.7% |
| Asian | 44 | 2.1% |
| Native Hawaiian and Other Pacific Islander | 6 | 0.3% |
| Some other race | 17 | 0.8% |
| Two or more races | 250 | 11.7% |
| Hispanic or Latino (of any race) | 76 | 3.6% |

=== Demographic estimates ===
The population density was 41.7 inhabitants per square mile (16.1/km2). The racial makeup of the CDP in 2021 was 84.1% White, 7.5% Native American, 1.8% Hispanic, 0.8% Asian, and 5.8% two or more other races. The average household size was 2.68 and the average family size was 3.32.

Since 2020 the median age of Bear Creek CDP has decreased by 1.5 years for both males and females, 1.1 years for males, and 4.9 years for females, for a total of 44.7 years, 45.9 years, and 38.9 years. From 2017 to 2021 the male and female population for 0-9 year-olds has increased by 74.26% and decreased by 63.5%, increased by 131.08% and 90.87% for 10-19 year-olds, decreased by 210.61% and increased by 121.16% for 20-29 year-olds, decreased by 4.92% and increased by 44.6% for 30-39 year-olds, increased by 71.79% and 35.25% for 40-49 year-olds, decreased by 69.62% and 56.83% for 50-59 year-olds, increased by 21.58% and 70.69% for 60-69 year-olds, and increased by 32.02% and decreased by 35.77% for 70 years and older.

=== Income and poverty ===
The median household income was $63,320. Males had a median income of $48,456 and females $47,188. The per capita income was $30,808. About 6.90% of families and 14.7% of the population were below the poverty line, including 10.5% of those under age 18 and none of those aged 65 or over. The median property value was $230,100 in 2020, 14.9% more than 2019's median of $200,200.

=== Employment ===
The employment to total population rate is 62.60%. The most common job groups, by the number of people living in Bear Creek, are Construction & Extraction Occupations with 115 employees, Management Occupations with 97 employees, and Office & Administrative Support Occupations with 90 employees.
