= Turnagain =

Turnagain may refer to:

- Turnagain Arm, a waterway into the northwestern part of the Gulf of Alaska
- Cape Turnagain, a prominent headland on the east coast of New Zealand's North Island
- Turnagain Island (Queensland), an island
- Turnagain Pass, a mountain pass just south of the municipal limits of Anchorage, Alaska
- Turnagain River, a river in the Canadian province of British Columbia
