= Interstate 1 (disambiguation) =

Interstate 1 may refer to either any of three unconnected Interstate Highways in the United States:

- Interstate A-1 in Alaska
- Interstate H-1 in Hawaii
- Interstate PRI-1 in Puerto Rico
- Interstate 1 in United States
