= Primrose, Alaska =

- Census-designated place
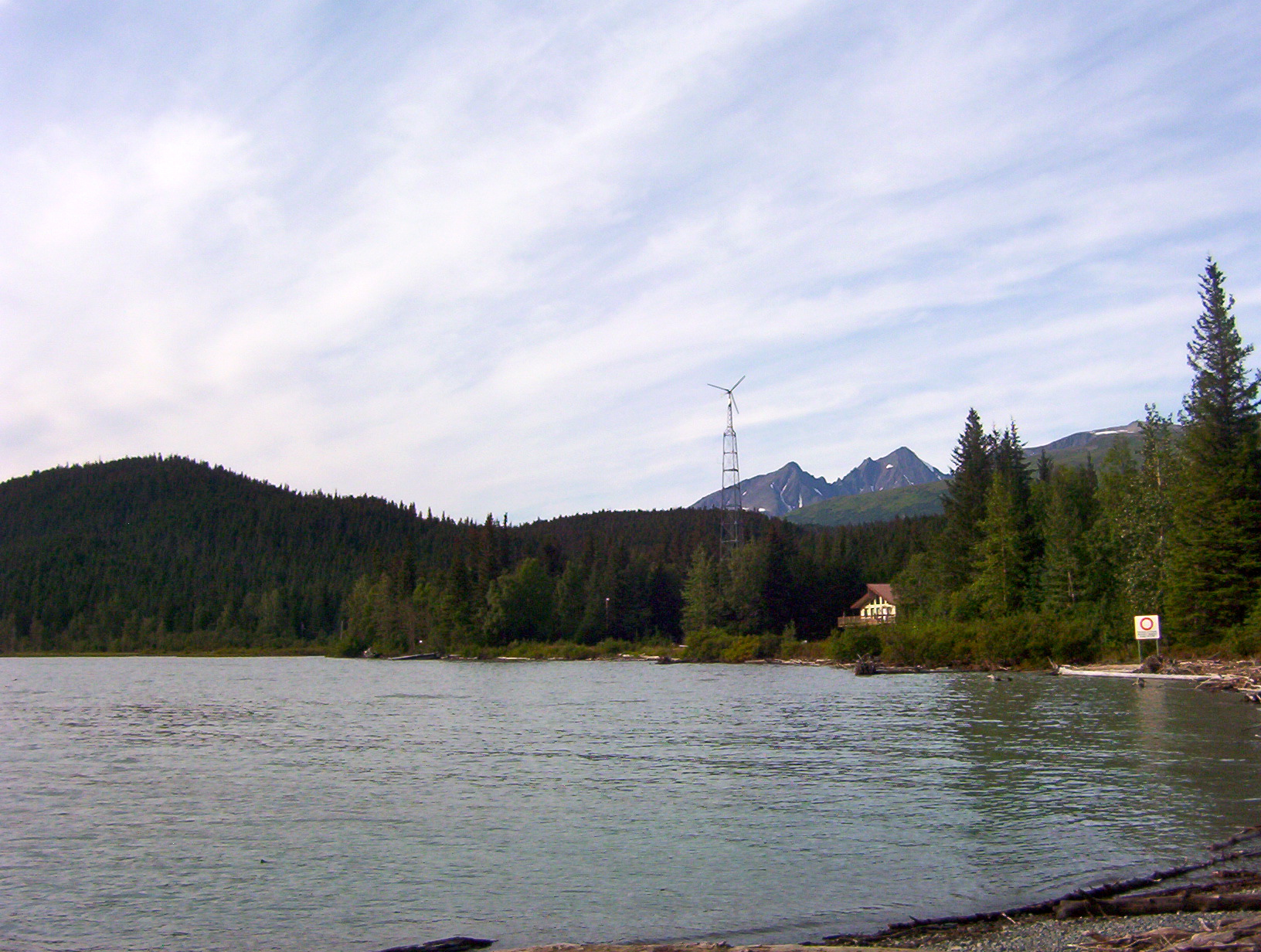
- Primrose waterfront seen from Chugach National Forest campground

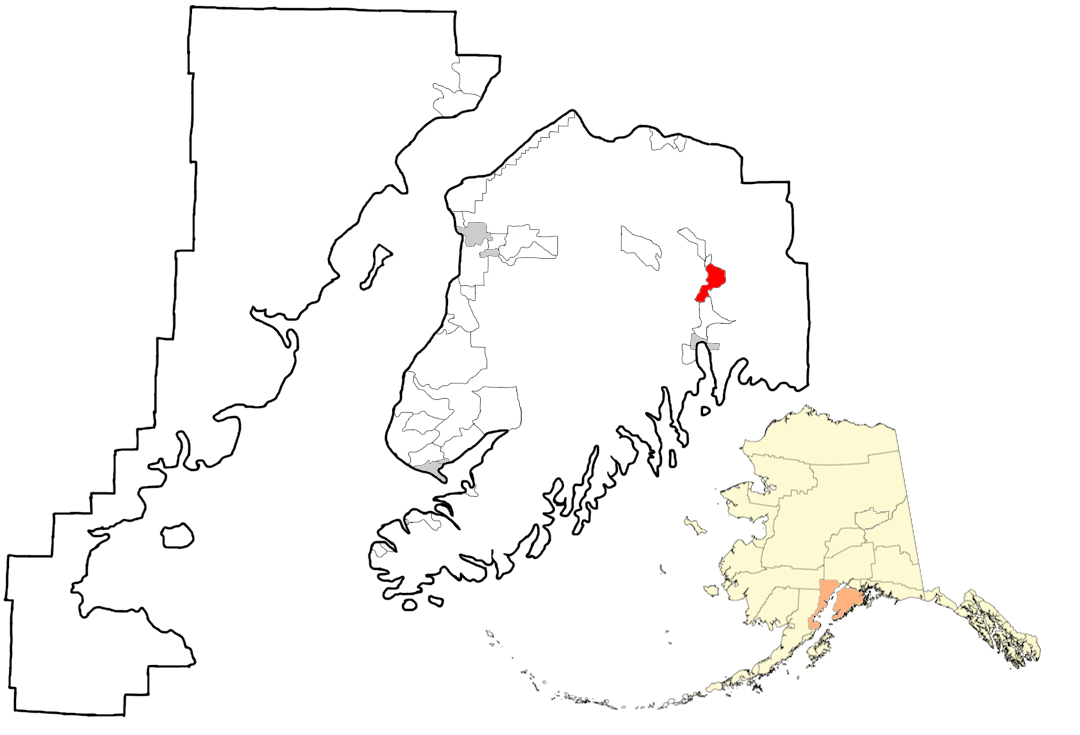
- Location in Kenai Peninsula Borough, Alaska
- Coordinates: 60°20′36″N 149°20′39″W
- Country: United States
- State: Alaska
- Borough: Kenai Peninsula

Government
  - Borough mayor: Peter Micciche
  - State senator: Jesse Bjorkman (R)
  - State rep.: Ben Carpenter (R)

Area
  - Total: 35.51 sq mi (91.96 km^{2})
  - Land: 34.47 sq mi (89.27 km^{2})
  - Water: 1.03 sq mi (2.68 km^{2})
- Elevation: 3,212 ft (979 m)

Population (2020)
  - Total: 96
  - Density: 2.8/sq mi (1.08/km^{2})
- Time zone: UTC-9 (Alaska (AKST))
  - Summer (DST): UTC-8 (AKDT)
- Area code: 907
- FIPS code: 02-64240
- GNIS feature ID: 2419191

Primrose is a census-designated place (CDP) in Kenai Peninsula Borough, Alaska, United States. As of the 2020 census, Primrose had a population of 96. Primrose is one of a number of small communities located north of Seward along the Seward Highway.

== Geography ==
Primrose is located on the eastern part of the Kenai Peninsula at 60°20′36″N 149°20′39″W (60.343405, -149.344250), at the mouth of the Snow River in Kenai Lake. It is bordered to the north by Crown Point and to the south by Bear Creek. Alaska Route 9, the Seward Highway, runs through the community, leading south 18 miles (29 km) to Seward and north the same distance to Alaska Route 1 at Tern Lake.

According to the United States Census Bureau, the Primrose CDP has a total area of 38.2 square miles (99.0 km^{2}), of which 34.5 square miles (89.3 km^{2}) are land and 1.0 square mile (2.7 km^{2}), or 2.92%, are water.

== Demographics ==
Historical population
Census	Pop.	Note	%±
1990	63		—
2000	93		47.6%
2010	78		−16.1%
2020	96		23.1%
U.S. Decennial Census

Primrose first appeared on the 1990 U.S. Census as a census-designated place (CDP).

As of the 2000 census, there were 93 people, 33 households, and 29 families residing in the CDP. The population density was 2.5 inhabitants per square mile (0.97/km^{2}). There were 47 housing units at an average density of 1.3 per square mile (0.50/km^{2}). The racial makeup of the CDP was 91.40% White, 3.23% Native American, 1.08% Asian, 1.08% Pacific Islander, and 3.23% from two or more races.

There were 33 households, out of which 42.4% had children under the age of 18 living with them, 75.8% were married couples living together, 6.1% had a female householder with no husband present, and 12.1% were non-families. 9.1% of all households were made up of individuals, and none had someone living alone who was 65 years of age or older. The average household size was 2.82 and the average family size was 3.00.

In the CDP, the population was spread out, with 34.4% under the age of 18, 1.1% from 18 to 24, 24.7% from 25 to 44, 28.0% from 45 to 64, and 11.8% who were 65 years of age or older. The median age was 42 years. For every 100 females, there were 93.8 males. For every 100 females age 18 and over, there were 96.8 males.

The median income for a household in the CDP was $66,111, and the median income for a family was $66,944. Males had a median income of $48,472 versus $0 for females. The per capita income for the CDP was $18,904. None of the population and none of the families were below the poverty line.
