= Johnson Pass =

Coordinates: 60°36′49″N 149°14′40″W

Johnson Creek Summit is a mountain pass through the Kenai Mountains in Southcentral Alaska. It is 23 miles long, and the maximum elevation of the pass is 1450 ft. There is a backpacking trail traversing the entire pass, with access from the south via the Sterling Highway and from the north via the Seward Highway. Along this established trail are waterfalls, bridges, lakes, and rockwalls.
