= Seward Highway to Glenn Highway Connection =

- Area of the proposed Highway to Highway

Route information
- Status: Planning stage

Major junctions
- South end: Seward Highway in Anchorage
- North end: Glenn Highway in Anchorage

Location
- Country: United States
- State: Alaska
- Boroughs: Municipality of Anchorage

Highway system
- Alaska Routes; Interstate; Scenic Byways

The Federal Highway Administration (FHWA), the Federal Transit Administration (FTA), and the Alaska Department of Transportation and Public Facilities (DOT&PF) are leading the Seward Highway to Glenn Highway Connection (also known as Highway to Highway or H2H), a proposed project in Anchorage, Alaska. If constructed, it will improve mobility and access for people and goods using multiple modes of travel on the roads that connect the Seward Highway and Glenn Highway. The lead agencies are coordinating the project with the Municipality of Anchorage (MOA) and the U.S. Army Corps of Engineers (USACE).

These two highways are currently connected by a network of arterial roads that, during typical rush hours, reach or overflow their capacity. According to the policy committee of the Anchorage Metropolitan Area Transportation Solutions (AMATS), “congestion on the Glenn Highway has worsened steadily as the Mat-Su Borough and Chugiak-Eagle River have claimed larger shares of regional growth” than has the City of Anchorage. The Long Range Transportation Plan (LRTP) outlines how we can improve our transportation system to make Anchorage a better place to live, work, and raise future generations of Alaskans. The plan envisions the H2H project as essential to solving traffic congestion in Anchorage.

== Project ==
The Alaska Department of Transportation & Public Facilities, in cooperation with the Municipality of Anchorage, initiated the Seward Highway to Glenn Highway Connection (H2H) project as the latest phase of transportation planning to reduce congestion and traffic impacts on small urban neighborhoods. The project, as it moves beyond the planning stages, will use a combination of municipal, state, and federal funds, and will comply with all regulations governing use of those funds, including the National Environmental Policy Act (NEPA).

=== NEPA Process ===
All projects receiving federal funding must comply with NEPA requirements. The Seward Highway to Glenn Highway Connection is currently in the scoping stage of project development. During the scoping process, the project team will collect input from the various individuals, community groups, and government agencies that will be incorporated into an Environmental Impact Statement. This statement will outline any potential project impacts, not only on the natural environment, but on the neighborhoods, ethnic groups, and income-groups within the project area.
