= Crown Point, Alaska =

- Census-designated place
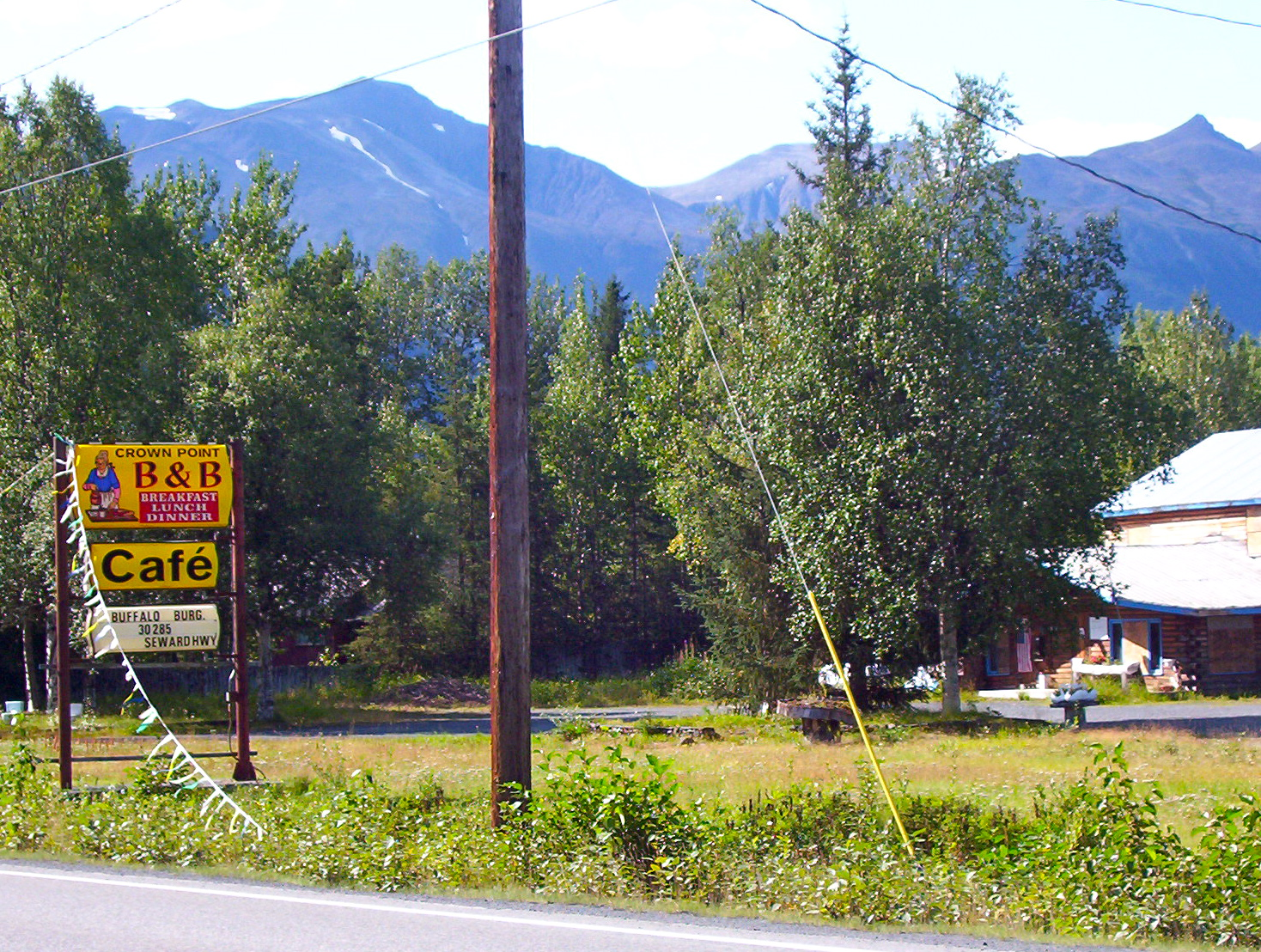
- Welcome to Crown Point

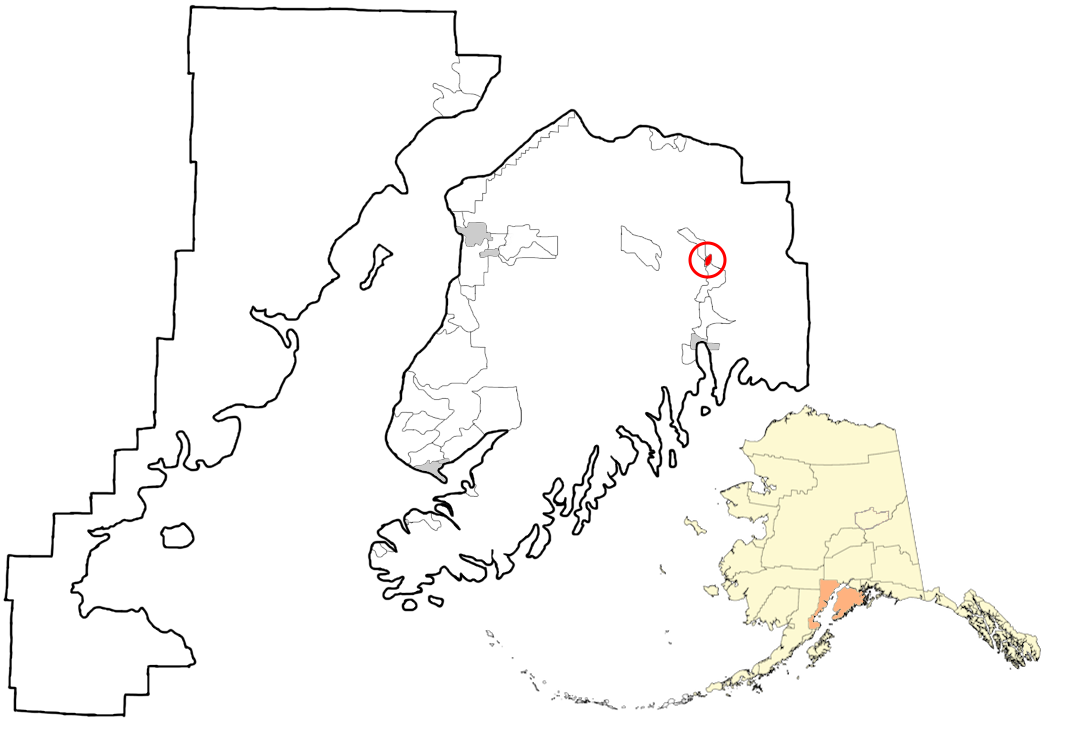
- Location in Kenai Peninsula Borough, Alaska
- Coordinates: 60°25′8″N 149°21′19″W
- Country: United States
- State: Alaska
- Borough: Kenai Peninsula

Government
  - Borough mayor: Peter Micciche
  - State senator: Jesse Bjorkman (R)
  - State rep.: Ben Carpenter (R)

Area
  - Total: 3.58 sq mi (9.26 km^{2})
  - Land: 3.58 sq mi (9.26 km^{2})
  - Water: 0 sq mi (0.00 km^{2})
- Elevation: 912 ft (278 m)

Population (2020)
  - Total: 119
  - Density: 33.3/sq mi (12.85/km^{2})
- Time zone: UTC-9 (Alaska (AKST))
  - Summer (DST): UTC-8 (AKDT)
- Area code: 907
- FIPS code: 02-17960
- GNIS feature ID: 1417059

Crown Point is a census-designated place (CDP) in Kenai Peninsula Borough, Alaska, United States. As of the 2020 census, Crown Point had a population of 119. Land access to this area is by either the Alaska Railroad or the Seward Highway.

== Geography ==
Crown Point is located in the north-central part of the Kenai Peninsula at 60°25′8″N 149°21′19″W (60.418833, -149.355340), near the confluence of the Trail River and Kenai Lake. It is bordered to the north by Moose Pass and to the south by Primrose. Alaska Route 9, the Seward Highway, leads north from Crown Point 12 miles (19 km) to Alaska Route 1 at Tern Lake, and south 24 miles (39 km) to Seward. Portions of this CDP were once the settlement known as Lawing, which was centered around Alaska Nellie's Homestead.

According to the United States Census Bureau, the Crown Point CDP has a total area of 3.6 square miles (9.3 km^{2}), all of it land.

== Demographics ==
Historical population
| Census | Pop. | Note | %± |
|---|---|---|---|
| 1990 | 62 | | — |
| 2000 | 75 | | 21.0% |
| 2010 | 74 | | −1.3% |
| 2020 | 119 | | 60.8% |
U.S. Decennial Census

Crown Point first appeared on the 1990 U.S. Census as a census-designated place (CDP).

As of the census of 2000, there were 75 people, 28 households, and 19 families residing in the CDP. The population density was 21.1 inhabitants per square mile (8.1/km^{2}). There were 38 housing units at an average density of 10.7 per square mile (4.1/km^{2}). The racial makeup of the CDP was 88.00% White, 4.00% Native American, 1.33% Asian, 1.33% from other races, and 5.33% from two or more races. 2.67% of the population were Hispanic or Latino of any race.

There were 28 households, out of which 32.1% had children under the age of 18 living with them, 60.7% were married couples living together, 3.6% had a female householder with no husband present, and 32.1% were non-families. 28.6% of all households were made up of individuals, and 10.7% had someone living alone who was 65 years of age or older. The average household size was 2.43 and the average family size was 2.95.

In the CDP, the population was spread out, with 21.3% under the age of 18, 5.3% from 18 to 24, 28.0% from 25 to 44, 36.0% from 45 to 64, and 9.3% who were 65 years of age or older. The median age was 42 years. For every 100 females, there were 97.4 males. For every 100 females age 18 and over, there were 126.9 males.

The median income for a household in the CDP was $59,063, and the median income for a family was $59,063. Males had a median income of $36,250 versus $41,250 for females. The per capita income for the CDP was $17,498. There were no families and 15.6% of the population living below the poverty line, including no under eighteens and 100.0% of those over 64.
