= Turnagain Pass =

Coordinates: 60°48′12″N 149°11′07″W

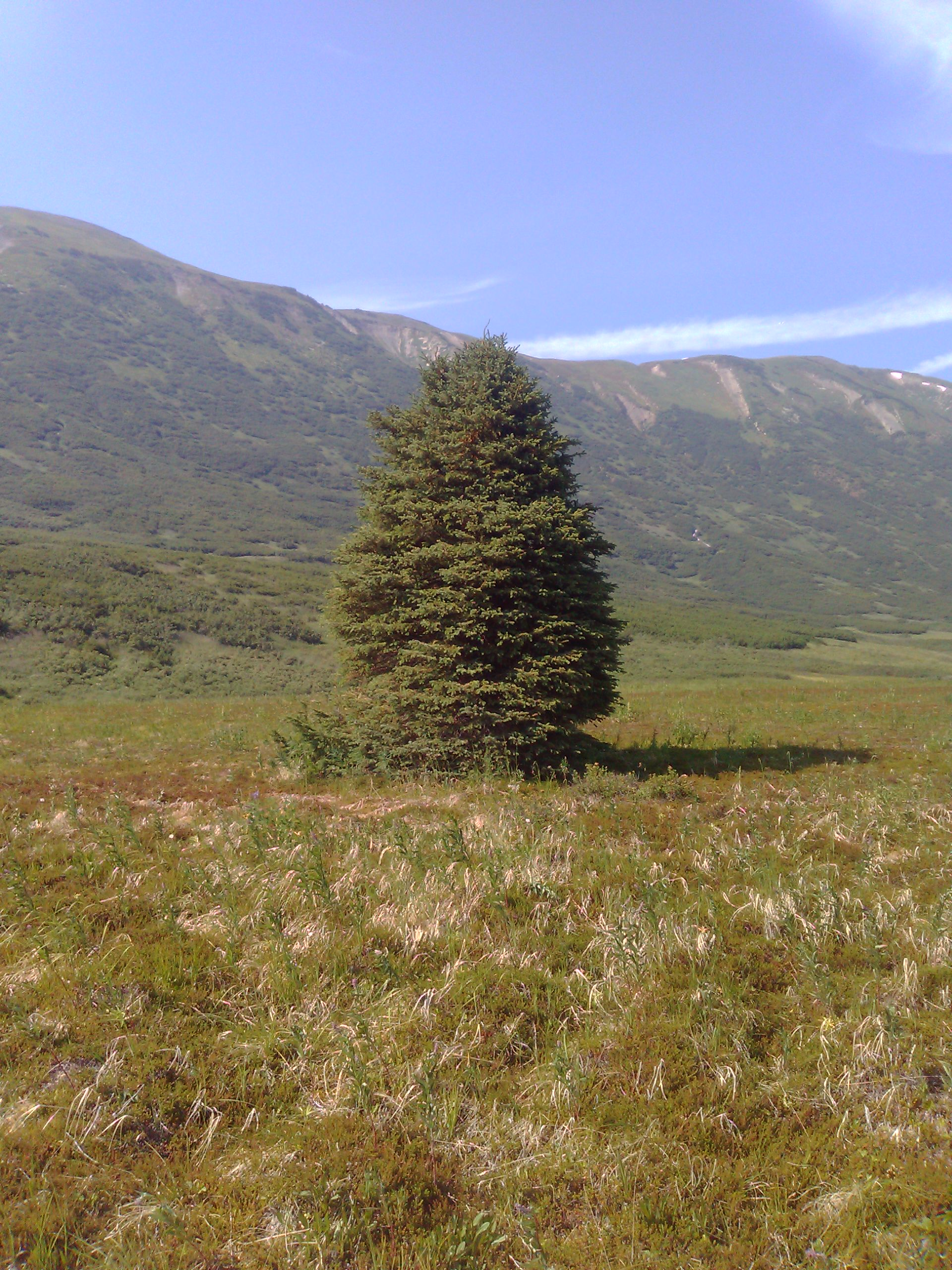
- White spruce in Turnagain Pass
- Interactive map of Turnagain Pass
- Elevation: 900 ft (270 m)
- Traversed by: 2-4 lanes of the Seward Highway (AK 1)

Third Approach
- Location: Kenai Peninsula Borough, Alaska, United States
- Range: Chugach Mountains

Turnagain Pass (el. 900 feet (274 m)) is a mountain pass just south of the municipal limits of Anchorage, Alaska. It is located in the northeastern part of Kenai Peninsula Borough. The pass marks the highest point on the Seward Highway at approximately milepost 70. Traveling north, the Seward Highway descends to skirt the edge of Turnagain Arm.

The pass is a popular winter recreation area for skiers, snowshoers, and snowmobilers. The designated recreation area is located within the Chugach National Forest, which maintains the Chugach National Forest Avalanche Information Center, whose forecasting area is centered on Turnagain Pass.
