= Snow River =

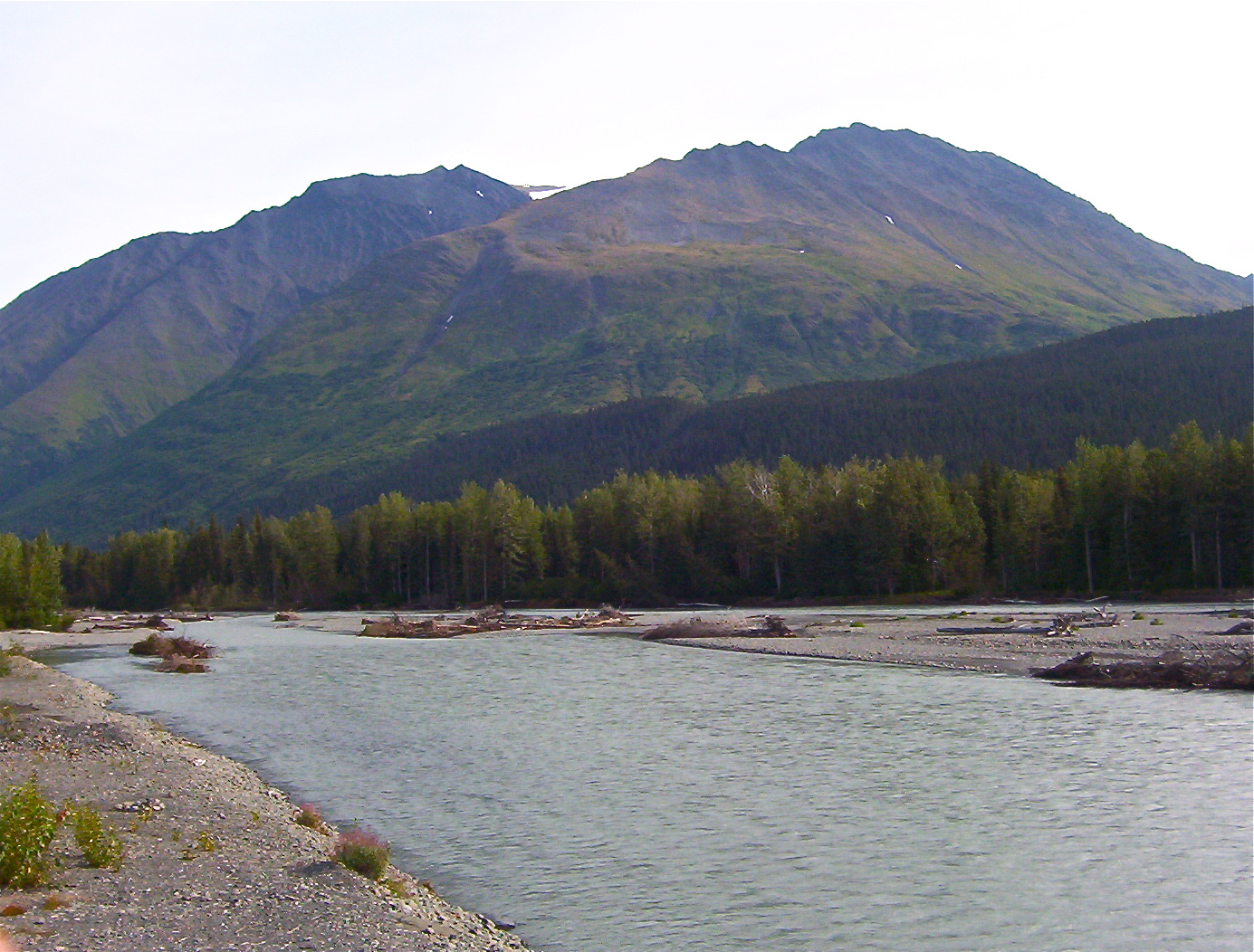
- Snow River

- Location of the mouth of the Snow River in Alaska

Location
- Country: United States
- State: Alaska
- Borough: Kenai Peninsula

Physical characteristics
- Source: Snow Glacier
  - location: Chugach National Forest
  - coordinates: 60°26′14″N 149°01′43″W
  - elevation: 1,721 ft (525 m)
- 2nd source: Near Godwin Glacier (South Fork)
- Mouth: Kenai Lake
  - location: 12 miles (19 km) northeast of Seward
  - coordinates: 60°20′18″N 149°21′16″W
  - elevation: 436 ft (133 m)
- Length: 28 mi (45 km)

The Snow River is a 28-mile (45 km) tributary of Kenai Lake in the U.S. state of Alaska. Beginning in the Kenai Mountains of the Kenai Peninsula, it flows southwest through Chugach National Forest where its main and south forks join to near Primrose at the southern inlet of the lake. The river mouth is about 12 miles (19 km) northeast of Seward. Along its final reaches, the river intersects the Iditarod Trail and passes under the Seward Highway. The glacier from which it flows has an associated glacial dammed lake that releases every few years, often causing flooding in Primrose and Kenai Lake.

== See also ==
- List of rivers of Alaska
