= Sterling Highway =

Highway in Alaska, United States

Sterling Highway
- Sterling Highway highlighted in red

Route information
- Maintained by Alaska DOT&PF
- Length: 132 mi (212 km)
- Existed: 1950–present

Major junctions
- South end: Alaska Marine Highway in Homer
- North end: AK-1 / AK-9 (Seward Highway) in Chugach National Forest

Location
- Country: United States
- State: Alaska

Highway system
- Alaska Routes; Interstate; Scenic Byways

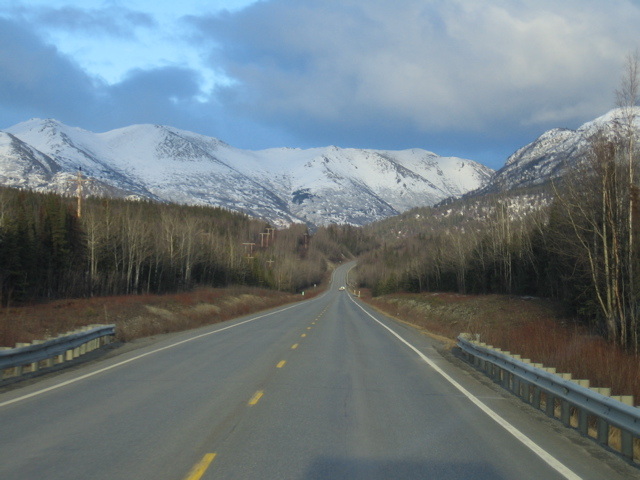
Sterling Highway eastbound, entering the Kenai Mountains.

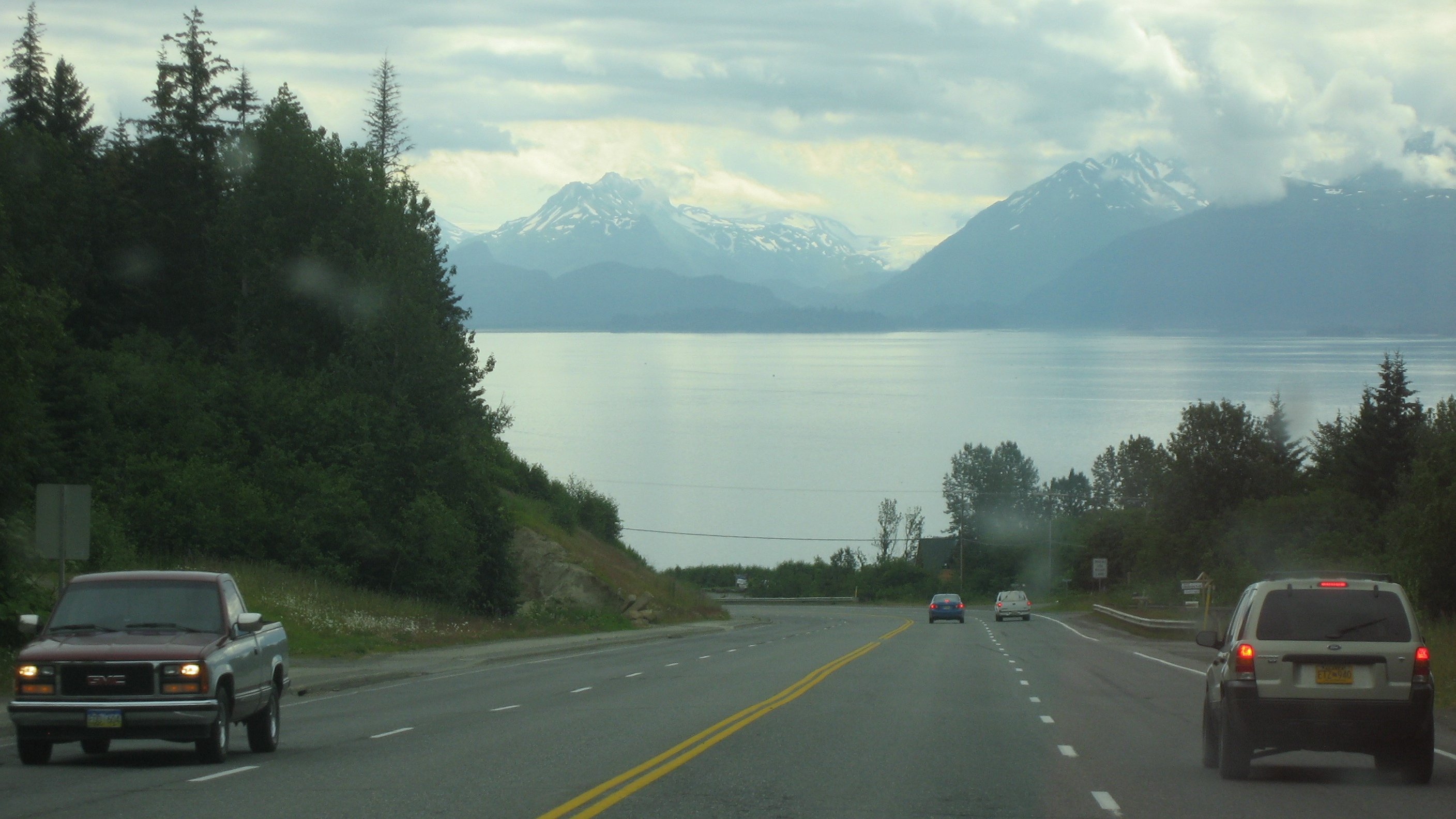
Sterling Highway at mile 170 (km 274), descending a long, steep hill (locally known as "Baycrest Hill") towards Homer.

The Sterling Highway is a 138-mile-long (222 km) state highway in the south-central region of the U.S. state of Alaska, leading from the Seward Highway at Tern Lake Junction, 90 miles (140 km) south of Anchorage, to Homer. To assist in agricultural transport and also open areas to tourism, work began on the Sterling Highway in 1946 to connect the Kenai Peninsula agricultural area with Seward. This highway honors Hawley W. Sterling, lifetime ARC engineer who served as assistant chief engineer from 1932 until his death in 1948.

The importance of the Sterling Highway was described in the Anchorage Daily Times article on its dedication in 1950:

It is the great achievement in the penetration of barriers that have kept Alaska’s development confined to shoreline establishments dependent upon marine transportation. The new road will give otherwise isolated peninsula farms access to markets for their farm products. In another year it will link the communities with Anchorage by way of the Turnagain Arm road, and all the cities of the continental United States by the way of the Alaska Highway. It opens up the great potential tourist and sportsmen developments by making the fishing, lakes and streams readily accessible by automobile. Alaska families will be able to live year round on their homesteads or fishing sites now that the Sterling Highway and its side roads enable their children to commute to school, give them access to medical aid and make it possible to move supplies as needed.

The Sterling Highway opened to traffic during the winter of 1950, when temperatures below freezing made it possible to travel over the unfinished surface. However, the highway required grading and gravel surfacing before being ready for summer traffic the following year. The highway was fully paved in 1958.

Anchor Point (Dena'ina: K’kaq’) is an unincorporated community and census-designated place (CDP) in Kenai Peninsula Borough, in the U.S. state of Alaska. As of the 2020 census, Anchor Point had a population of 2,105.[2] The community is located along the Sterling Highway, part of Alaska State Route 1. Anchor Point is the westernmost point in the North American highway system.

== Route description ==
The Sterling Highway is part of Alaska Route 1. It leads mainly west from Tern Lake to Soldotna, paralleling the Kenai River, at which point it turns south to follow the eastern shore of Cook Inlet. It is the only highway in the western and central Kenai Peninsula, and most of the population of the Kenai Peninsula Borough lives near it. The highway also gives access to many extremely popular fishing and recreation areas, including the Chugach National Forest, Kenai National Wildlife Refuge, and the Kenai, Funny, and Russian rivers. The southern end of the highway is at the tip of the Homer Spit, a landspit extending 4.5 miles (7.2 km) into Kachemak Bay. A ferry terminal here connects the road to the Alaska Marine Highway.

== Interstate Highway System ==
Interstate A-3
- Location: Soldotna to Anchorage
- Length: 238.38 mi (383.64 km)
- Existed: 1976–present

Sterling Highway is part of the unsigned part of the Interstate Highway System as Interstate A-3.

== Major intersections ==
Mileposts on the Sterling Highway begin with Mile 37 (60 km), continuing from the mileposts of the Seward Highway. (The 0 (zero) mile marker for the Seward Highway is in downtown Seward, at the intersection of 3rd and Railway Avenues. Thus, mileposts along the Sterling Highway reflect distance from Seward, which is not actually on the Sterling Highway.

The entire route is in Kenai Peninsula Borough.

Location	mi	km	Destinations	Notes
Homer	0	0.0	AK-1 south (Lake Street) / Health Street	Continues south to Alaska Marine Highway terminal
Soldotna	75	121	Kenai Spur Highway north – Kenai	
Chugach National Forest	132	212	AK-1 north / AK-9 south (Seward Highway) – Anchorage, Seward	Tern Lake Junction; northern terminus of AK-9
1.000 mi = 1.609 km; 1.000 km = 0.621 mi
