= Minnesota Drive Expressway =

Highway in Alaska

- Spenard Thruway
- Minnesota Drive Expressway highlighted in red

Route information
- Maintained by Alaska DOT&PF and MATD
- Length: 7.560 mi (12.167 km)
- Existed: c. 1950–present

Major junctions
- South end: Old Seward Highway in Anchorage
- North end: West 15th Avenue in Anchorage

Location
- Country: United States
- State: Alaska
- Borough: Anchorage

Highway system
- Alaska Routes; Interstate; Scenic Byways

The Minnesota Drive Expressway is a 7.560-mile-long (12.167 km) south–north expressway located in the city of Anchorage, Alaska, United States. The expressway includes a small portion of O'Malley Road, which is also built to expressway standards. The highway travels from the southern region of Anchorage northward to North Star neighborhood area, and bisects the community of Spenard. The first section of the highway was constructed around 1950, and the entire highway was upgraded to expressway standards by the year of 1985. The entire length of the expressway is listed on the National Highway System.

== Route description ==
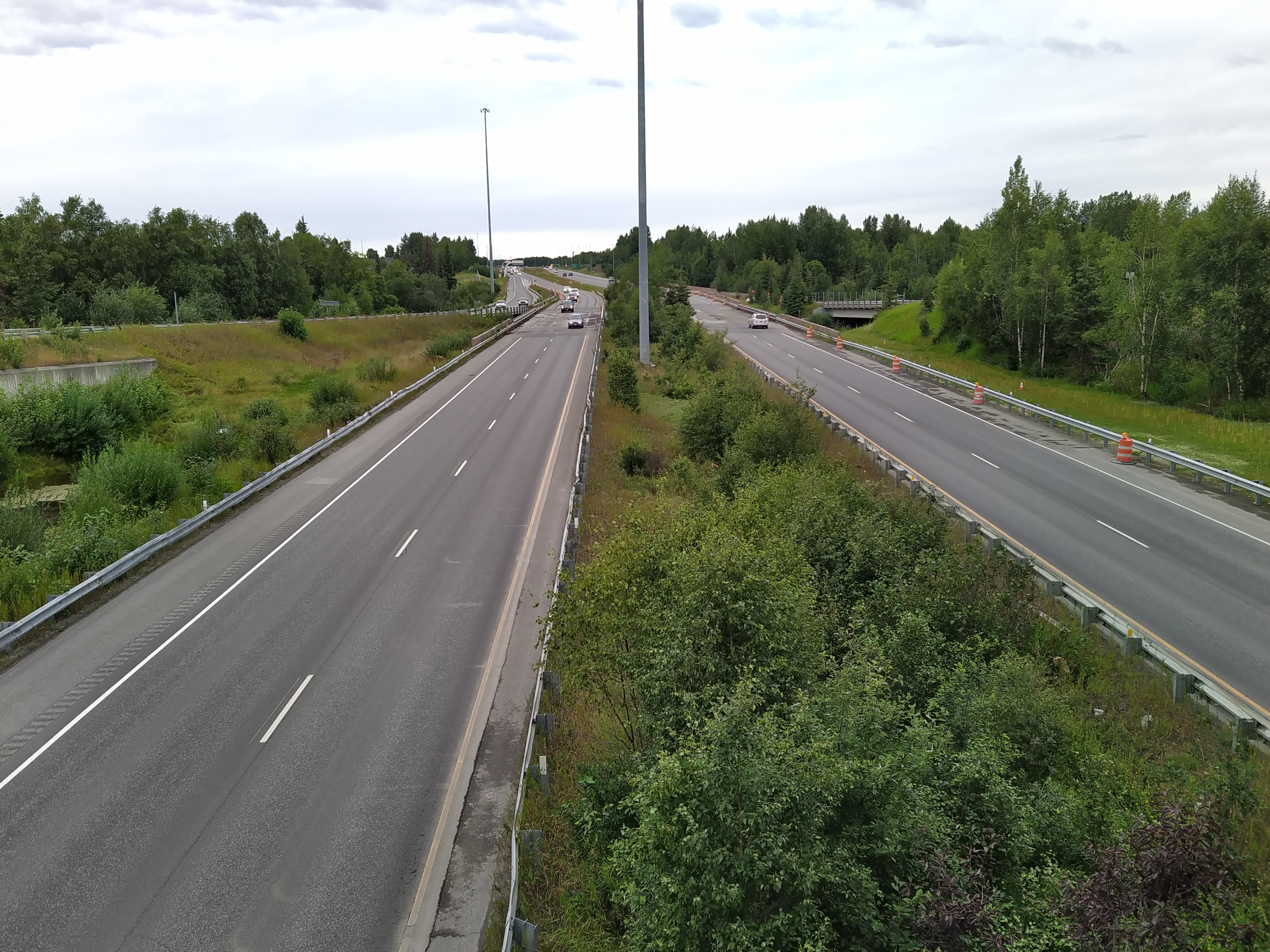
Northbound view of Minnesota Drive from the Dimond Boulevard overpass. The bridges crossing Campbell Creek are a short distance ahead.

The route begins where O'Malley Road intersects the Old Seward Highway. At this point, the route is heading directly west, even though the expressway is south–north. O'Malley Road is, at this point, a four-lane, paved, asphalt road. That intersection is the last at-grade intersection on O'Malley Road. From there, the expressway continues on for about 0.7 miles (1.1 km), passing under a set of railroad tracks, before reaching its first exit, for C Street. The highway passes over C Street and continues past a few small properties before curling north and becoming renamed Minnesota Drive. Almost immediately after the turn is the exit for 100th Avenue. The highway passes over 100th Avenue, and continues past a large neighborhood. The expressway continues, reaching an incomplete interchange with Dimond Boulevard, where the expressway's frontage roads terminate. The highway continues past several large neighborhoods, with an exit for the neighborhoods on the western side of the highway. The roadway continues northward, interchanging with Raspberry Road and passing over a small hiking trail.

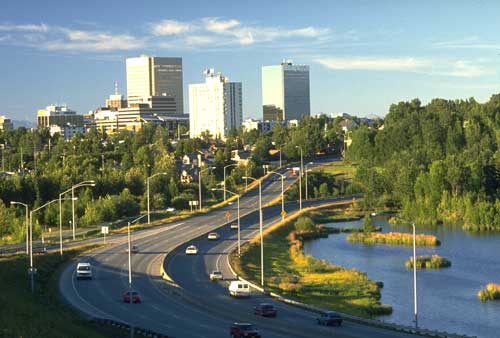
Northbound view of Minnesota Drive as it crosses Westchester Lagoon approaching its northern terminus. The skyline of downtown Anchorage is in the background.

The expressway passes a large industrial area before interchanging with International Airport Road, which provides access to Ted Stevens Anchorage International Airport. The highway passes over a railroad track, continues past a large industrial area and a large neighborhood, before reaching an at-grade intersection with Tudor Road, which marks the end of the main controlled-access section of the expressway. The roadway intersects several small roads, and passes numerous small businesses, before intersecting with Spenard Road. The highway continues past several more businesses, intersecting several small roads, including Benson Boulevard and Northern Lights Boulevard, before being upgraded to freeway standards. The expressway passes two small lakes, with a southbound exit for Hillcrest Drive, which provides access to West Anchorage High School. The highway continues northward, merging with Spenard Road and passing a small neighborhood, before intersecting 15th Avenue, where the expressway terminates. The road continues northward as I Street (northbound) and L Street (southbound).

=== Traffic ===
Traffic on the Minnesota Drive Expressway is very high, with a yearly average of approximately 260,000. Daily traffic for the expressway varies greatly, with the highest count being the interchange with International Airport Road, with an average of 47,157, while the lowest count is where O'Malley Road becomes Minnesota Drive, with a daily average of 22,209.

== History ==
The Minnesota Drive Expressway was first created circa 1950, when the Spenard Road was built in the location of the current highway. By 1962, a highway existed from the northern terminus southward to Dimond Boulevard. By 1983, most portions of the highway had been created, and by 1985, the highway had been fully completed. The entire length of the highway was upgraded to expressway standards between 1989 and 2008.

In 2012 the highway was designated the Walter J. Hickel Expressway in honor of the former governor.

On November 30, 2018, a ramp connecting Minnesota Drive to area streets collapsed, as well as the surrounding hillside, during a magnitude 7.0 earthquake that struck the area. A driver in an SUV who was on the section of destroyed highway was stranded, but uninjured.

== Major junctions ==
The entire route is in the Municipality of Anchorage. All exits are unnumbered.

mi	km	Destinations	Notes
0.000	0.000	Old Seward Highway / O'Malley Road east	At-grade intersection; O'Malley Road continues east
0.200	0.322	South end of Minnesota Drive Expressway	
0.500	0.805	Lang Street	Southbound entrance only
0.760	1.223	C Street	
1.730	2.784	West 100th Avenue	Southern end of frontage roads
2.300	3.701	Dimond Boulevard	No northbound exit
3.300	5.311	Strawberry Road	Southbound exit only
3.830	6.164	Raspberry Road	
4.740	7.628	International Airport Road – Anchorage International Airport	
5.360	8.626	North end of Minnesota Drive Expressway	
5.360	8.626	Tudor Road	At-grade intersection
5.780	9.302	Spenard Road	At-grade intersection
6.260	10.074	Benson Boulevard	One-way (east)
6.370	10.252	Northern Lights Boulevard	One-way (west)
6.500	10.461	South end of Spenard Thruway	
6.730	10.831	Hillcrest Drive	Southbound exit only; access to West Anchorage High School
7.330	11.796	Spenard Road	Northbound entrance only
7.560	12.167	West 15th Avenue / I Street	Northern terminus
1.000 mi = 1.609 km; 1.000 km = 0.621 mi: Incomplete access
