= Alaska Route 1 =

Highway in Alaska, United States

Alaska Route 1
- Route 1 highlighted in red

Route information
- Maintained by Alaska DOT&PF
- Length: 545.92 mi (878.57 km)

Major junctions
- West end: Alaska Marine Highway in Homer
- Kenai Spur Highway in Soldotna; AK-9 in Chugach National Forest; O'Malley Road in Anchorage; AK-3 near Wasilla; AK-4 in Glennallen and Gakona
- East end: AK-2 at Tok

Location
- Country: United States
- State: Alaska
- Boroughs: Kenai Peninsula, Municipality of Anchorage, Matanuska-Susitna, Unorganized

Highway system
- Alaska Routes; Interstate; Scenic Byways
← AK-98	→ AK-2

Alaska Route 1 (AK-1) is a state highway in the southern part of the U.S. state of Alaska. It runs from Homer northeast and east to Tok by way of Anchorage. It is one of two routes in Alaska to contain significant portions of freeway: the Seward Highway in south Anchorage and the Glenn Highway between Anchorage and Palmer.

AK-1 is also known by the named highways it traverses:

- Sterling Highway from Homer to Tern Lake Junction
- Seward Highway from Tern Lake Junction to Anchorage
- Glenn Highway from Anchorage to Glennallen
- Richardson Highway from Glennallen and Gakona Junction
- Tok Cut-Off from Gakona Junction to Tok

== Route description ==
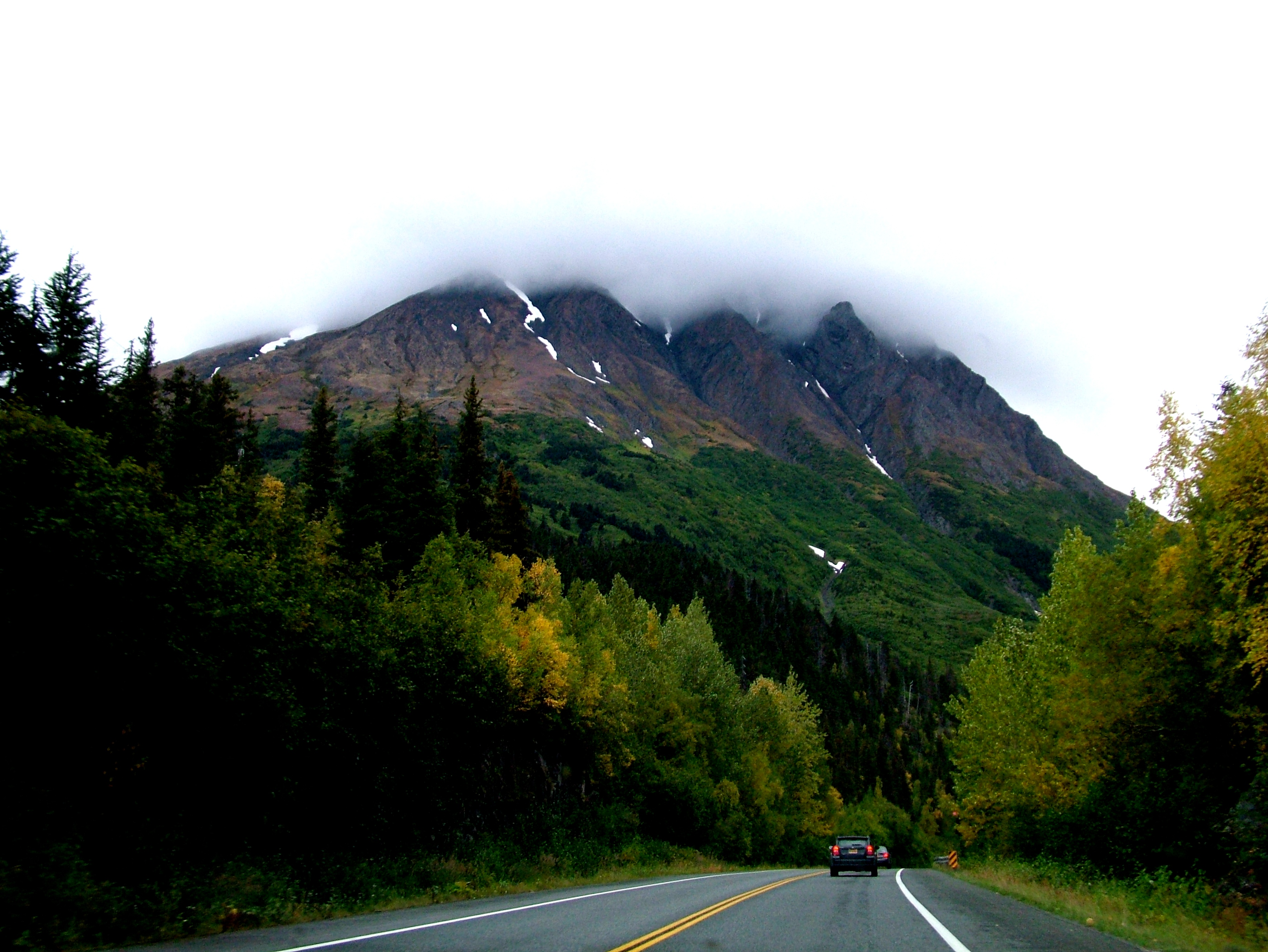
Alaska Highway 1, in the Chugach National Forest, approaching a snow-capped mountain range

AK-1 begins at the Alaska Marine Highway's Homer Ferry Terminal at the tip of Homer Spit just south of the end of the Sterling Highway in Homer. It follows the entire Sterling Highway through Soldotna to the junction with the Seward Highway north of Seward, where it meets the north end of AK-9. There it turns north and follows the Seward Highway to its end in Anchorage, and follows the one-way pairs of Ingra and Gambell Streets and 6th and 5th Avenues, continuing east on 5th Avenue to the beginning of the Glenn Highway. AK-1 follows the entire length of the Glenn Highway, passing the south end of the George Parks Highway (AK-3) near Wasilla and meeting the Richardson Highway (AK-4) near Glennallen. A short concurrency north along AK-4 takes AK-1 to the Tok Cut-Off, which it follows northeast to its end at the Alaska Highway (AK-2) at Tok.

The majority of AK-1 is part of the Interstate Highway System; only the route between Homer and Soldotna does not carry an unsigned Interstate designation. The entire length of A-3 follows AK-1 from the Kenai Spur Highway in Soldotna to the turn in downtown Anchorage; there A-1 begins, running to Tok along AK-1. (A-1 continues to the Yukon border along AK-2, the Alaska Highway.) Only a short portion of the Seward Highway south of downtown Anchorage and a longer portion of the Glenn Highway northeast to AK-3 are built to freeway standards; the proposed Highway to Highway Connection would link these through downtown.

== Major intersections ==
All exits are unnumbered.

Borough	Location	mi	km	Destinations	Notes
Kenai Peninsula	Homer	0.00	0.00	Land's End Resort	Dead end
Kenai Peninsula	Homer	0.09	0.14	Homer Ferry Terminal	To Alaska Marine Highway
Kenai Peninsula	Homer			Heath Street	Southern terminus of Sterling Highway
Kenai Peninsula	Soldotna	81.03	130.41	Kenai Spur Highway north – Kenai	Southern terminus of Interstate A3
Kenai Peninsula	Chugach National Forest	138.18	222.38	AK-9 south (Seward Highway) – Seward	Northern terminus of AK-9; AK-1 transitions to Seward Highway
Kenai Peninsula	Chugach National Forest			Hope Highway north – Hope	
Municipality of Anchorage		179.72	289.23	Portage Glacier Road east – Whittier, Portage Glacier	
Municipality of Anchorage				Old Seward Highway north	
Municipality of Anchorage		218.39	351.46	Southern terminus of freeway section	
Municipality of Anchorage		218.81	352.14	Old Seward Highway / Rabbit Creek Road	
Municipality of Anchorage		219.37	353.04	DeArmoun Road	Southbound exit and northbound entrance
Municipality of Anchorage		220.48	354.83	Huffman Road	
Municipality of Anchorage		221.45	356.39	O'Malley Road	To Ted Stevens Anchorage International Airport
Municipality of Anchorage		222.96	358.82	Dimond Boulevard	
Municipality of Anchorage		223.66	359.95	76th Avenue	Southbound exit and northbound entrance
Municipality of Anchorage		224.46	361.23	Dowling Road	Dumbbell interchange
Municipality of Anchorage		225.46	362.84	Tudor Road	
Municipality of Anchorage		226.01	363.73		
Municipality of Anchorage				Old Seward Highway south	Interchange; southbound exit only
Municipality of Anchorage				Northern terminus of freeway section	
Municipality of Anchorage				20th Avenue	Northern terminus of Seward Highway
Municipality of Anchorage				Mountain View Drive	Southern terminus of Glenn Highway
Municipality of Anchorage				Southern terminus of freeway section	
Municipality of Anchorage		230.04	370.21	Bragaw Street	
Municipality of Anchorage		231.08	371.89	Boniface Parkway / Mountain View Drive – JBER-Elmendorf	
Municipality of Anchorage		231.84	373.11	Turpin Street	Northbound exit and entrance
Municipality of Anchorage		232.66	374.43	Muldoon Road	DDI interchange
Municipality of Anchorage		234.22	376.94	Arctic Valley Road	Northbound exit and southbound entrance
Municipality of Anchorage		235.71	379.34	JBER-Richardson, Arctic Valley	Via D Street
Municipality of Anchorage		239.70	385.76	Eagle River Loop Road / Hiland Road	
Municipality of Anchorage		241.45	388.58	Eagle River	Via Old Glenn Highway
Municipality of Anchorage		243.30	391.55	North Eagle River	Via North Eagle River Access Road
Municipality of Anchorage		245.31	394.79	South Birchwood	Via South Birchwood Loop Road
Municipality of Anchorage		248.73	400.29	North Birchwood	Via Birchwood Loop Road
Municipality of Anchorage		249.73	401.90	Peters Creek	Via Voyles Boulevard
Municipality of Anchorage		250.75	403.54	North Peters Creek	Via Lake Hill Drive
Municipality of Anchorage		252.03	405.60	Mirror Lake	Via Old Glenn Highway and Paradis Lane
Municipality of Anchorage		253.17	407.44	Thunderbird Falls	Via Old Glenn Highway; northbound exit and entrance
Municipality of Anchorage		254.05	408.85	Eklutna	Via Eklutna Village Road
Municipality of Anchorage		257.57	414.52	Old Glenn Highway	
Knik River				SFC James Bondsteel Bridge of Honor	
Matanuska-Susitna		259.06	416.92	Knik River Access	
Matanuska-Susitna	Palmer	263.32	423.77	AK-3 north – Wasilla, Fairbanks	Southern terminus of AK-3 (George Parks Highway)
Matanuska-Susitna	Palmer	263.32	423.77	Northern terminus of freeway section	
Matanuska-Susitna	Palmer			Palmer-Wasilla Highway / Evergreen Avenue	
Unorganized	Glennallen	409.54	659.09	AK-4 south (Richardson Highway) – Valdez	Southern terminus of AK-4 concurrency; northern terminus of Glenn Highway and Interstate A3
Unorganized	Gakona	423.54	681.62	AK-4 north (Richardson Highway) – Fairbanks	Northern terminus of AK-4 concurrency; southern terminus of Tok Cutoff Highway
Unorganized	Tok	545.92	878.57	AK-2 (Alaska Highway) – Fairbanks, Canadian Border	
1.000 mi = 1.609 km; 1.000 km = 0.621 mi: Concurrency terminus; Incomplete access; Route transition

== Tok Cut-Off ==
Tok Cut-Off
- Location: Gakona—Tok
- Length: 125 mi (201 km)
- Existed: c. 1940–present

The Tok Cut-Off is a highway in the U.S. state of Alaska, running 125 miles (201 km) from Gakona (on the Richardson Highway, 14 miles (23 km) north of Glennallen), to Tok on the Alaska Highway which had been constructed from Montana through Calgary, Alberta, through Whitehorse, Canada by Army engineers to move supplies and equipment, and to build airbases, to service the requirements of the Pacific theater, including transport of Lend Lease aircraft to the Soviet Union after its invasion by Germany.

The road was built in the 1940s through challenging terrain, largely by battalions of Black engineers, including the 97th Engineer Battalion. in order to facilitate transport of World War II material in particular from ports such as Valdez and Anchorage to the interior. It was upgraded in the 1950s to better connect the Richardson Highway more directly with Tok. It was called a "cut-off" because it allowed motor traffic coming to and from Canada on the Alaska Highway, to drive directly northeast or southwest connect to or from Southcentral Alaska communities without driving all the way to or from the terminus of the Alaska highway in Delta Junction, then traveling northwest or southeast by the Richardson Highway, reducing 120 miles (190 km) from the trip.

The 2002 Denali earthquake caused significant damage to the Cut-Off, particularly between mileposts 75 and 83 where major cracks and embankment slumping left the roadway fundamentally destroyed.
