= List of Interstate Highways in Alaska =

Dwight D. Eisenhower National System of Interstate and Defense Highways
- Shields for Interstates in Alaska
- Interstates of Alaska highlighted in red

System information
- Length: 1,082.22 mi (1,741.66 km)
- Formed: 1976

Highway names
- Interstates: Interstate A-n (A-n) (unsigned)
- State: Alaska Route n (AK-n)

System links
- Alaska Routes; Interstate; Scenic Byways

The Interstate Highways in Alaska are all owned and maintained by the US state of Alaska. The Alaska Department of Transportation & Public Facilities (DOT&PF) is responsible for the maintenance and operations of the Interstate Highways. The Interstate Highway System in Alaska comprises four highways that cover 1,082.22 miles (1,741.66 km). The longest of these is Interstate A-1 (A-1), at 408.23 miles (656.98 km) long, while the shortest route is A-3, at 148.12 miles (238.38 km) long. All Interstates in Alaska are unsigned and are not generally referred to by their highway numbers.

Interstates in Alaska follow the numbering system Interstate A-n, where n represents the number of the Interstate. This follows the similar numbering systems for Hawaii and Puerto Rico. The Interstate Highway System was expanded to Alaska in 1976, by the Federal-Aid Highway Act of 1976, which defined the system for Interstates in Alaska and Puerto Rico under 23 U.S.C. § 103(c)(1)(B)(ii).

Most of the lengths of the Interstates in Alaska are not constructed to Interstate Highway standards but are small, rural, two-lane undivided highways. Title 23 provides that "Highways on the Interstate System in Alaska and Puerto Rico shall be designed in accordance with such geometric and construction standards as are adequate for current and probable future traffic demands and the needs of the locality of the highway." Some portions of these highways are built to Interstate standards, though. The Seward Highway, part of A-3, is built to freeway standards in Anchorage. The Glenn Highway, which is part of A-1, is built to freeway standards from Anchorage to Wasilla. A very small portion of the George Parks Highway, A-4, is constructed to freeway standards in Wasilla. In and around Fairbanks, the Richardson Highway, part of A-2, is constructed to freeway standards. In addition to these highways, the Johansen Expressway, in Fairbanks, and the Minnesota Drive Expressway, in Anchorage, are constructed to expressway standards.

== Routes ==
Number	Length (mi)	Length (km)	Southern or western terminus	Northern or eastern terminus	Formed	Removed	Notes
A-1	408.23	656.98	Anchorage	Canadian border in Alcan Border	1976	current	Glenn Highway, Richardson Highway, Tok Cut-Off, Alaska Highway
A-2	202.18	325.38	Tok	Fairbanks	1976	current	Alaska Highway, Richardson Highway
A-3	148.12	238.38	Soldotna	Anchorage	1976	current	Seward Highway, Sterling Highway
A-4	323.69	520.93	Gateway, near Palmer	Fairbanks	1976	current	Parks Highway

== Gallery ==
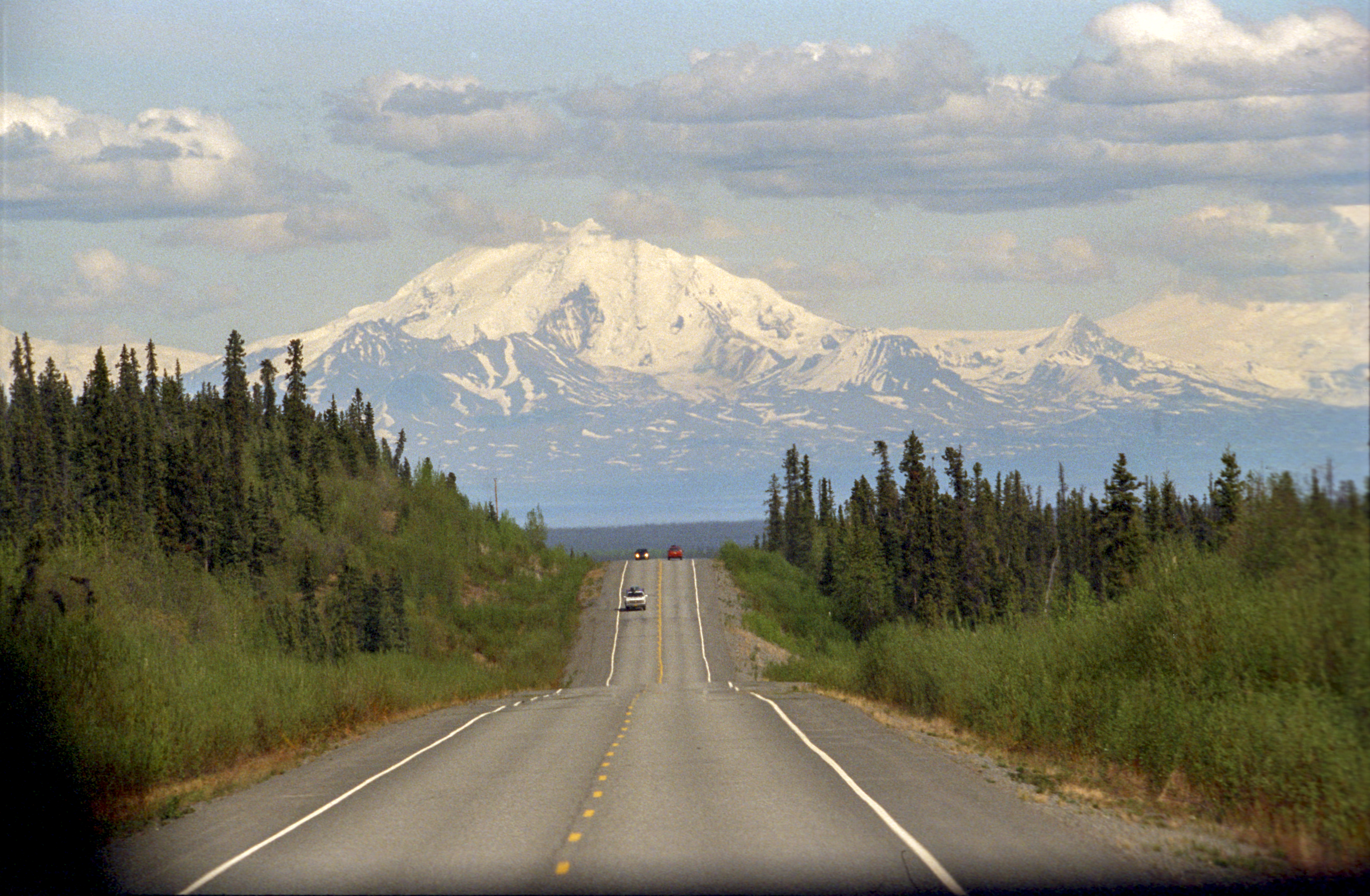
The Glenn Highway, eastbound near Glennallen, is part of A-1.

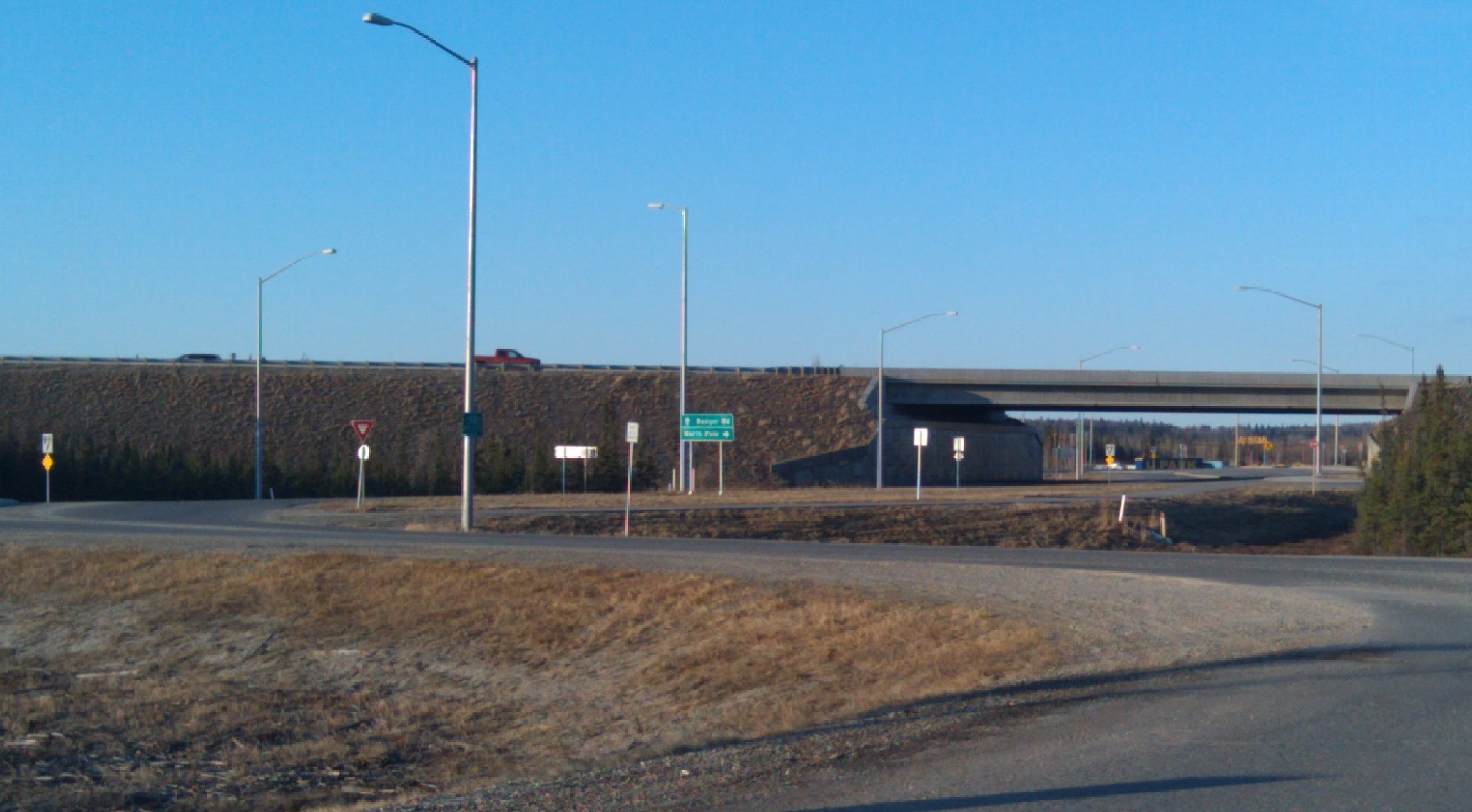
An interchange between the Richardson Highway, part of A-2, and Badger Road in Fairbanks

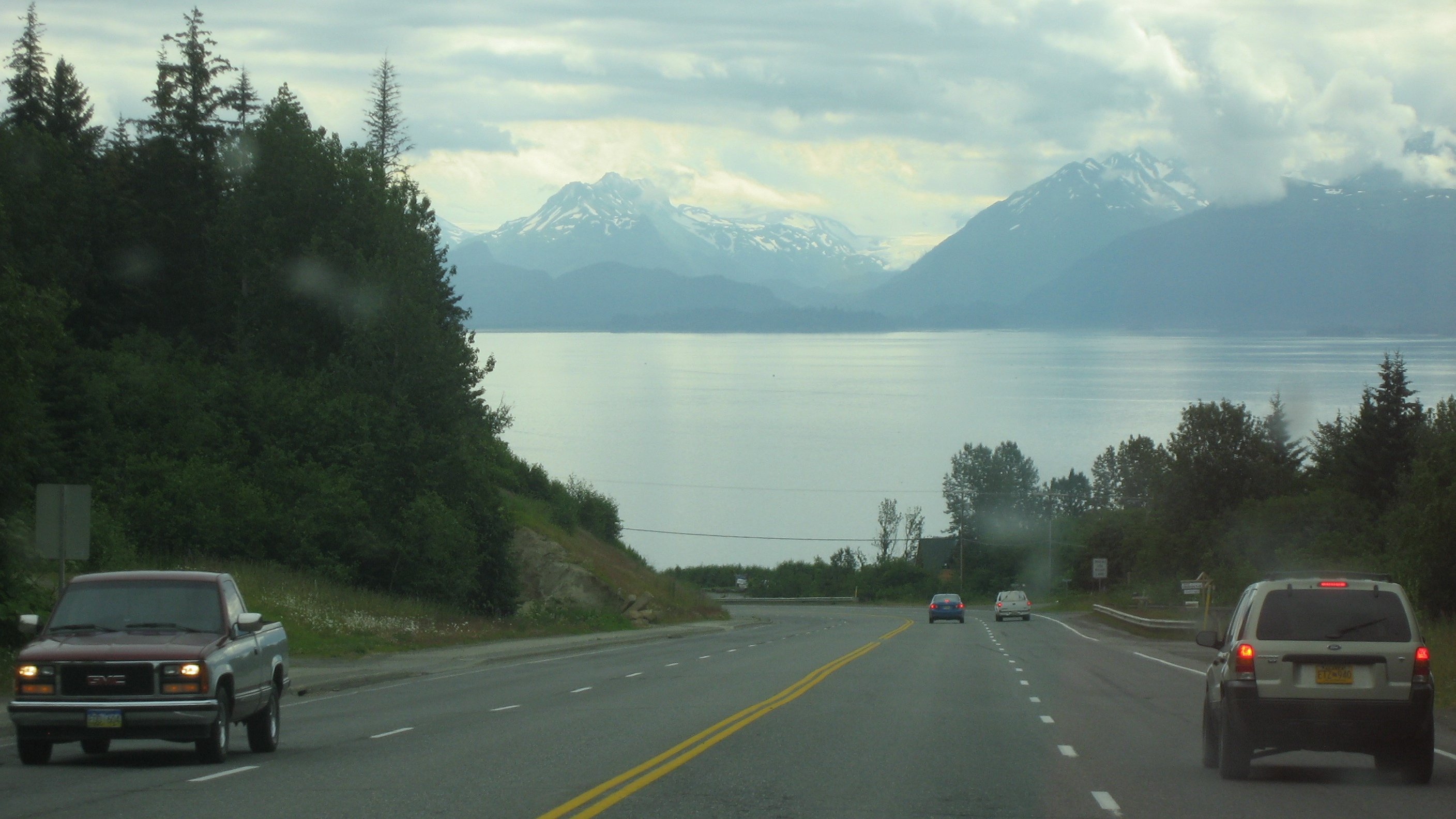
The Sterling Highway, westbound near Homer, is part of A-3.

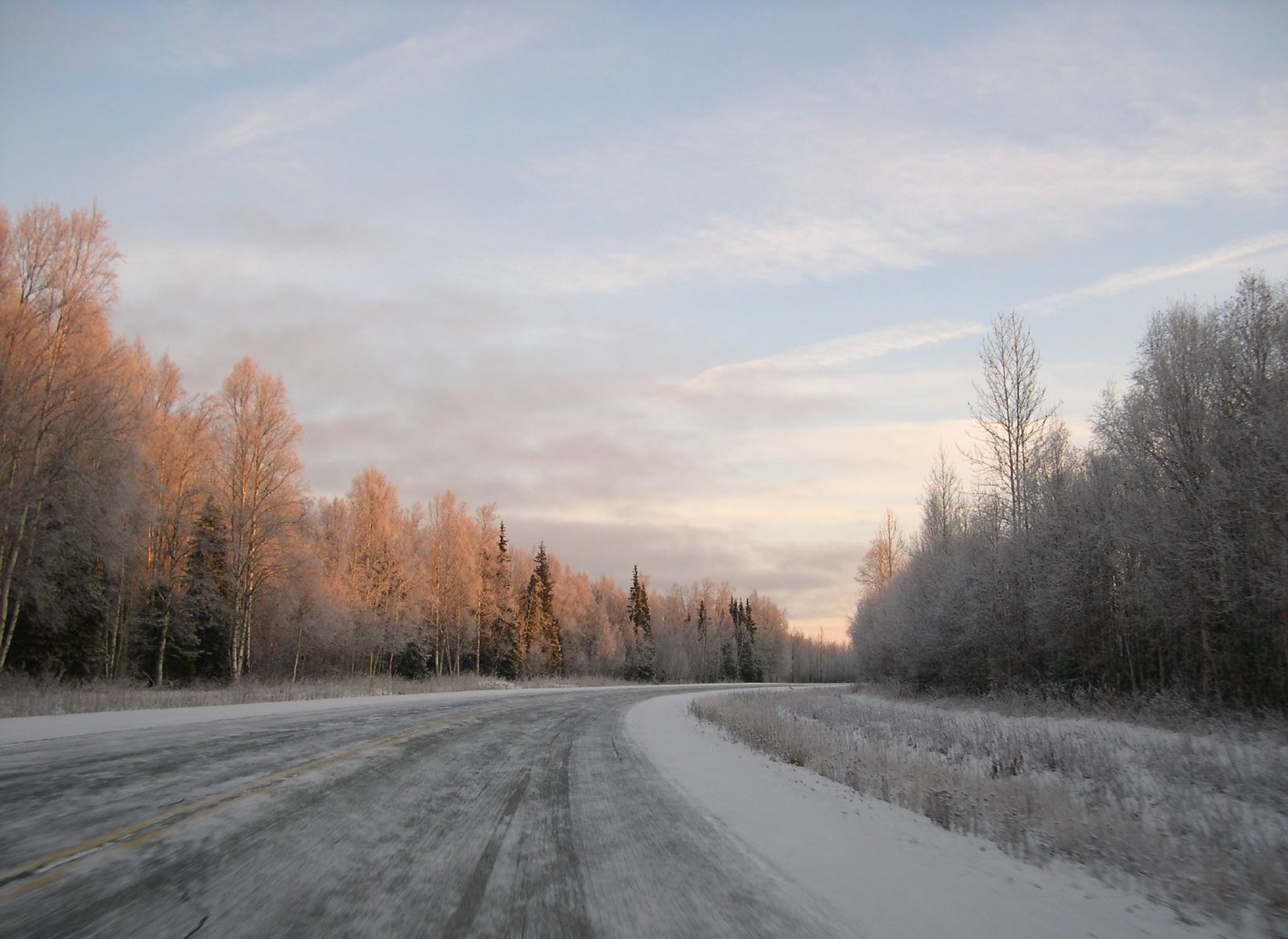
The George Parks Highway, which comprises the entirety of A-4

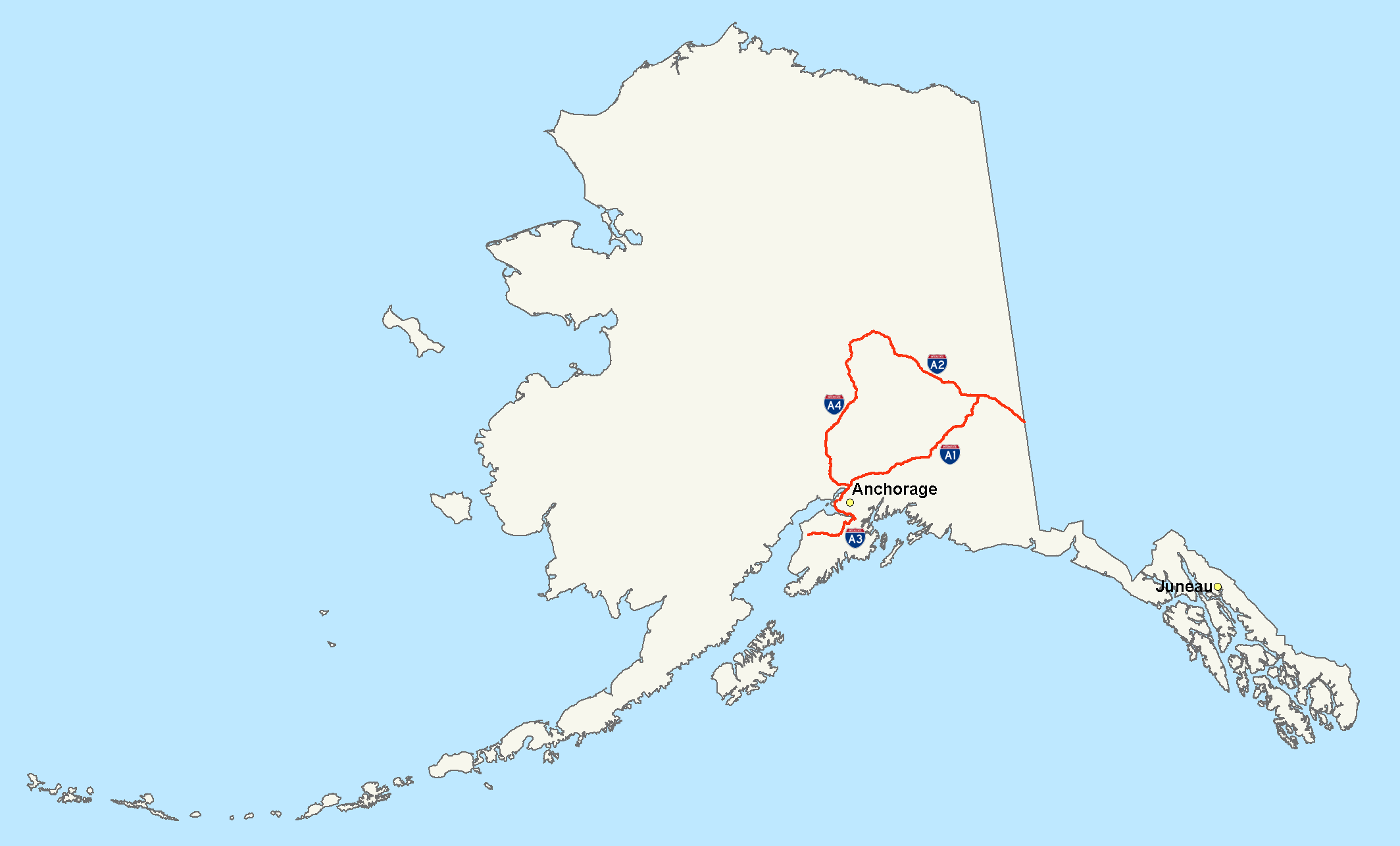
Interstate Alaska map
