= Seward Highway =

Highway in Alaska, United States

Seward Highway
- Seward Highway highlighted in red

Route information
- Length: 125.336 mi (201.709 km)
- Existed: 1923–present
- Component highways: AK-9 Seward to Moose Pass; AK-1 Moose Pass to Anchorage
- Tourist routes: Seward Highway

Major junctions
- South end: Railway Avenue in Seward
- Forest Highway 46 (Herman Leirer Road) in Bear Creek; Forest Highway 61 (Primrose Spur Road) in Primrose; AK-1 (Sterling Highway); Forest Highway 14 (Hope Highway); Forest Highway 35 (Portage Glacier Highway); Minnesota Drive Expressway; AK-1 (Gambell Street / Ingra Street)
- North end: East 5th Avenue in Anchorage

Location
- Country: United States
- State: Alaska
- Boroughs: Kenai Peninsula, Municipality of Anchorage

Highway system
- Alaska Routes; Interstate; Scenic Byways
- Scenic Byways; National; National Forest; BLM; NPS
← AK-8	AK-9	→ AK-10

The Seward Highway is a highway in the U.S. state of Alaska that extends 125 miles (201 km) from Seward to Anchorage. It was completed in 1951 and runs through the scenic Kenai Peninsula, Chugach National Forest, Turnagain Arm, and Kenai Mountains. The Seward Highway is numbered Alaska Route 9 (AK-9) for the first 37 miles (60 km) from Seward to the Sterling Highway and AK-1 for the remaining distance to Anchorage. At the junction with the Sterling Highway, AK-1 turns west towards Sterling and Homer. About eight miles (13 km) of the Seward Highway leading into Anchorage is built to freeway standards. In Anchorage, the Seward Highway terminates at an intersection with 5th Avenue, which AK-1 is routed to, and which then leads to the Glenn Highway freeway.

== Route description ==
The full length of the Seward Highway has been listed on the National Highway System (NHS), a network of roads important to the country's economy, defense, and mobility. The segment designated AK-9 between Seward and Tern Lake Junction is part of the STRAHNET subsystem, highways that are important to defense policy and which provide defense access, continuity and emergency capabilities for defense purposes. The remainder that follows AK-1 is also designated Interstate A-3 (A-3) and included in the NHS on that basis. The state's Interstate Highways are not required to comply with Interstate Highway standards, instead "shall be designed in accordance with such geometric and construction standards as are adequate for current and probable future traffic demands and the needs of the locality of the highway" under federal law. The highway is maintained by the Alaska Department of Transportation & Public Facilities (Alaska DOT&PF), and the A-1 designation is not signed along the highway. In 2010, 2,520 vehicles used the highway near the junction with Sterling Highway in a measure of the annual average daily traffic, the lowest tally along the highway. The highest traffic count as recorded by Alaska DOT&PF was 58,799 vehicles daily at the Dowling Road overpass in Anchorage. In 2012, Life magazine included the Seward Highway in its list of Most Scenic Drives in the World.

=== Seward to Bear Creek ===
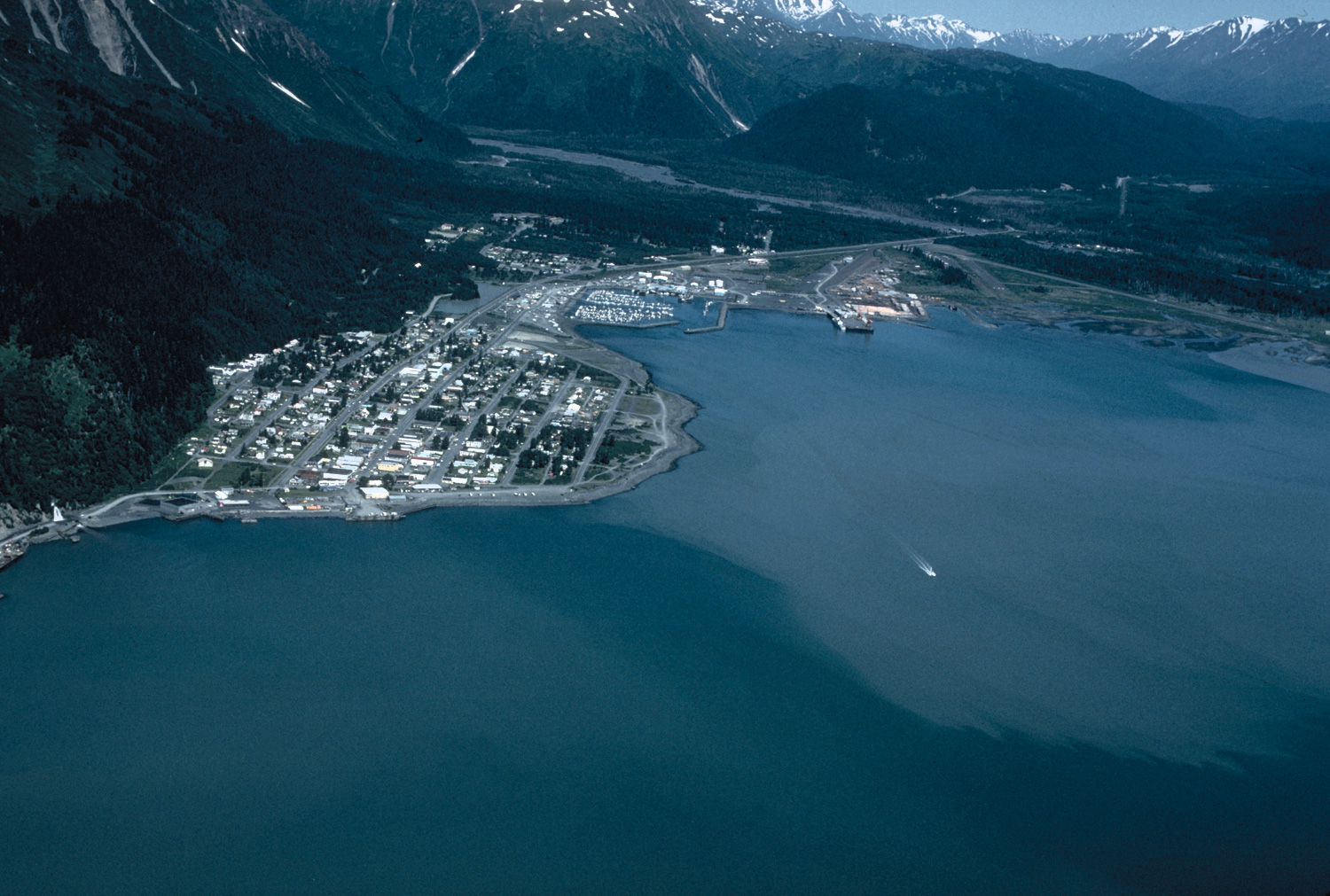
An aerial view of Seward and vicinity, including Bear Creek. (The southern end of the Seward Highway runs through the center of the photo.)

The Seward Highway begins at an intersection with Railway Avenue, in Seward, less than 300 feet (91 m) from Resurrection Bay. At this point, the Seward Highway is two lanes, with a parking lane on each side. The Seward Highway is designated as AK-9 at this point of the route. The highway continues through downtown Seward and residential areas. The highway continues past the Seward Airport and Exit Glacier road, before entering the unincorporated community of Bear Creek. Just after entering Bear Creek, a series of tracks belonging to the Alaska Railroad comes alongside the roadway. These railroad tracks continue on with the Seward Highway until Moose Pass, return near a junction with the Portage Glacier Highway, and remain until the highway becomes a freeway, in southern Anchorage. The Seward Highway proceeds through central Bear Creek, passing Bear Lake, until entering Chugach National Forest.

=== Chugach National Forest ===
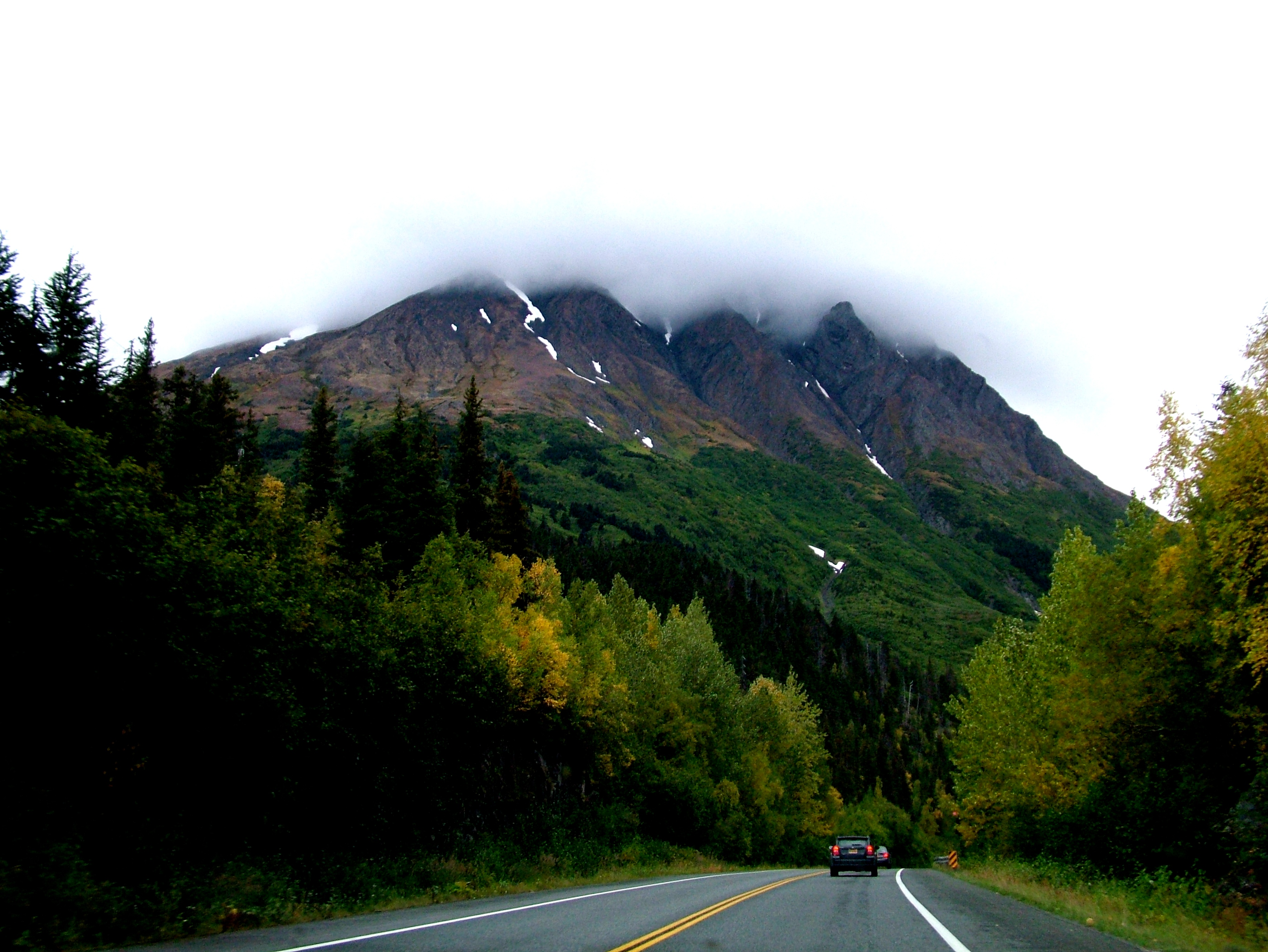
Seward Highway, in the Chugach National Forest, approaching a snow-capped mountain range

The Seward Highway enters the Chugach National Forest just 5 miles (8.0 km) after its start. The highway enters the Chugach National Forest while it is still part of the Bear Creek community, so it gives the appearance of still being inside that census-designated place. After a mile or so (1.6 km) though, the area surrounding the highway begins to look more like a national forest. The Alaska Railroad weaves back and forth under the highway, which causes the highway to traverse a series of small bridges. For a few miles after the bridges, the Seward Highway is a four-lane road, but then merges back to two lane. After passing through about 10 miles (16 km) of forest, the highway passes Primrose Spur Road, and enters Primrose. For the next five or so miles (8 km), the route runs on a thin strip of land between the mountains and Kenai Lake. At the northern end of Kenai Lake, the route passes through Crown Point, and provides access to a large campground where Trail Creek empties into Kenai Lake. The highway runs alongside Trail Creek for about 6 miles (9.7 km), before passing the settlement of Moose Pass. The road continues, passing along Upper Trail Lake for a few miles, before returning to the dense forest, and passing a large mountain range. After a few more miles, the road passes the Tern Lake Junction, and intersects with Alaska Route 1 (AK-1) (also known as the Sterling Highway), where Alaska Route 9 terminates, and the Seward Highway is designated to AK-1.

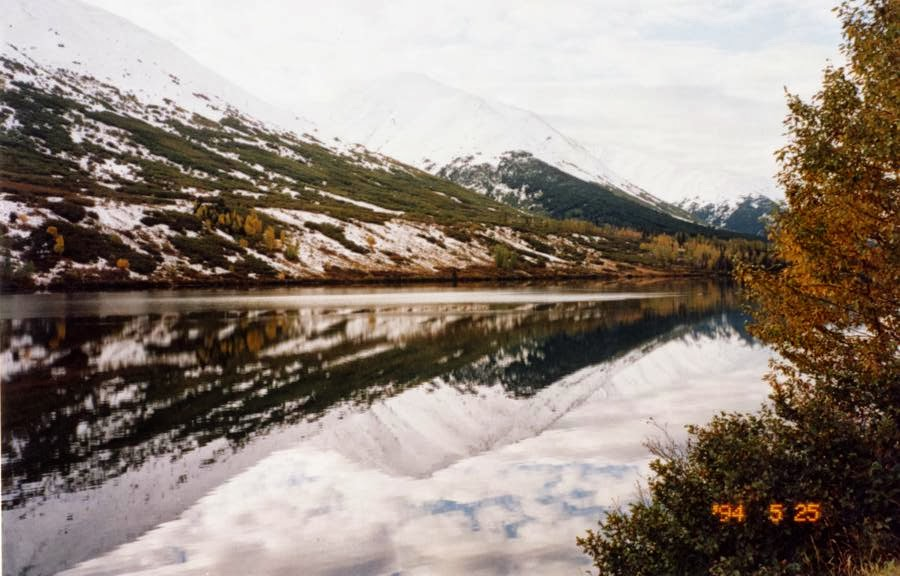
Summit Lake

It is at this point that the road begins to climb into the actual mountains to approach Turnagain Pass. For several miles, the roadway continues through large, Alaskan spruce forests. After approximately 10 miles (16 km), the highway passes Summit Lake, and provides access to another large campground. The road then continues through the mountains. After about 8 miles (13 km), the route intersects the Hope Highway, which provides access to the city of Hope, and the highway reenters forest. The route continues through the mountains for about 24 miles (39 km) more, before a steep decline, at which point the highway exits the Kenai Peninsula and continues along the shores Turnagain Arm. Just after reaching Turnagain Arm, the highway enters the city limits of Anchorage (and remains within Anchorage proper for the remainder of its route). After intersecting the Portage Glacier Highway the Alaska Railroad tracks again come alongside the route. The highway continues through the Chugach National Forest for approximately 8 miles (13 km), passing the Turnagain Arm to the west, and the Kenai Mountains to the east. It then exits the Chugach National Forest, having spent approximately 72 miles (116 km) inside its boundaries.

=== Girdwood to Anchorage ===
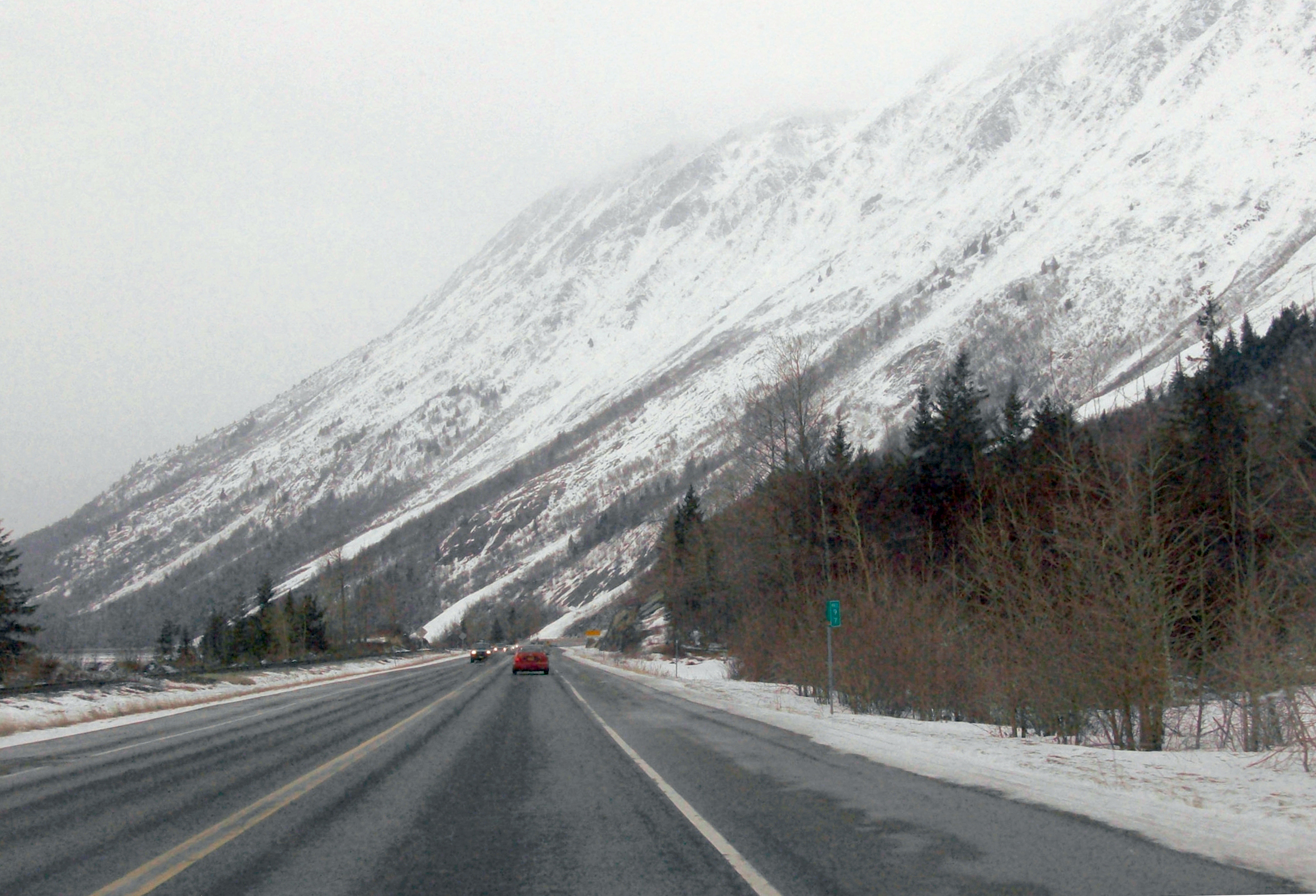
Wintertime view of the Seward Highway at mile 97 (km 156), looking northbound as it passes through Bird. The Chugach Mountains are in the background. The Alaska Railroad tracks are to the left of the highway.

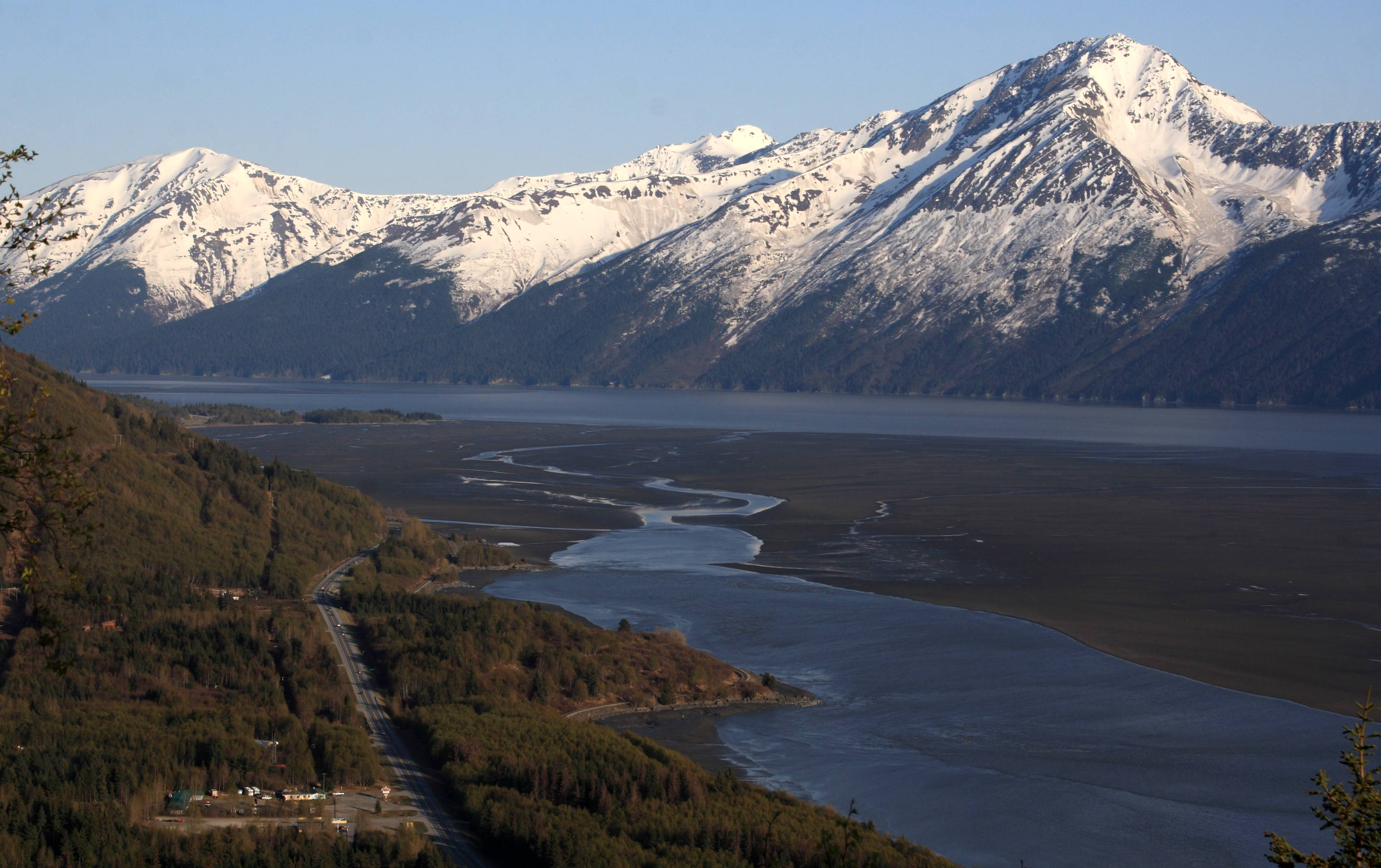
Aerial view of the highway as it passes through Bird, looking southbound, showing a larger area than the above photo. Turnagain Arm and the Kenai Mountains are in the background.

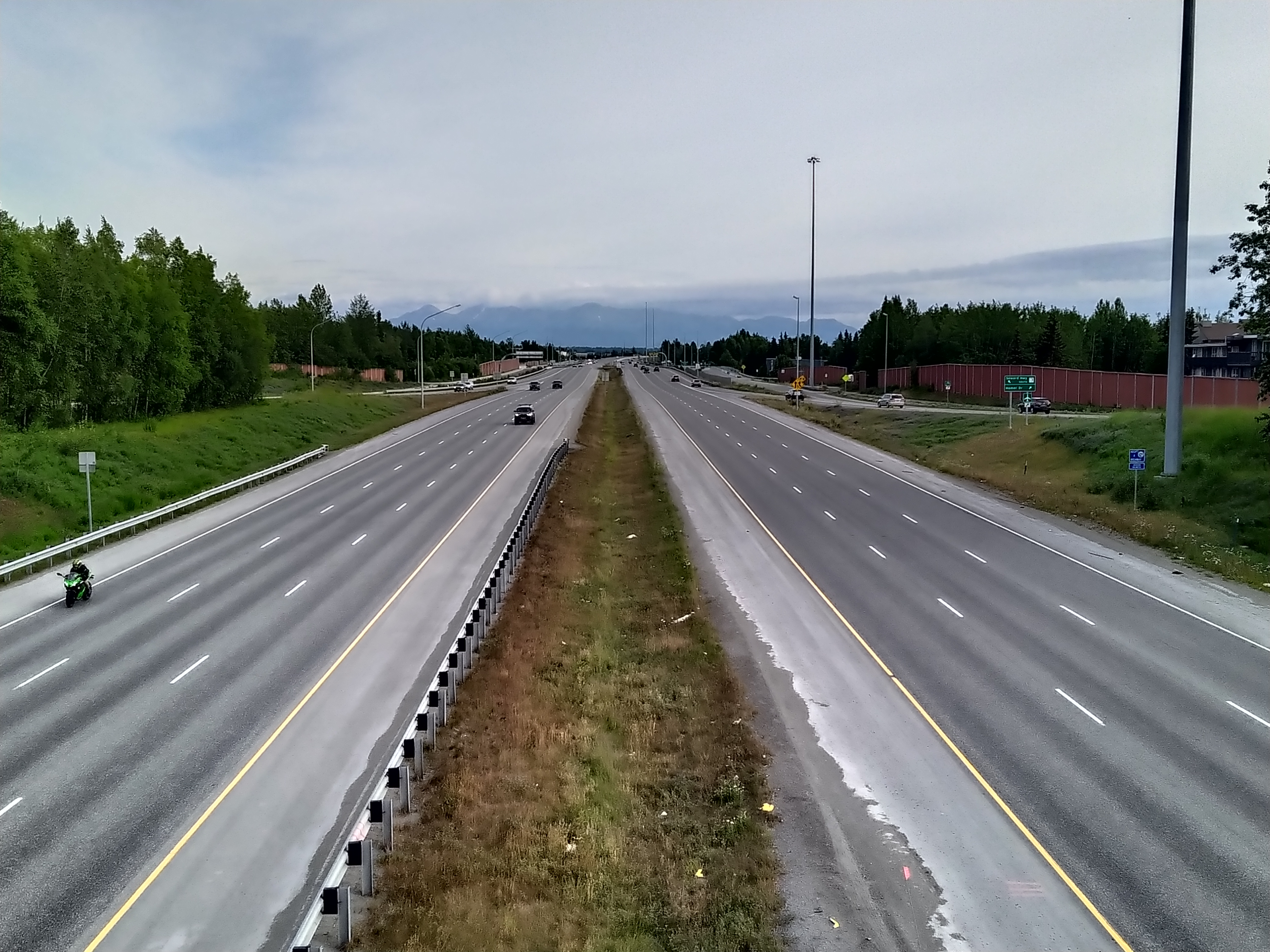
Southbound Seward Highway viewed from Tudor Road, showing capacity improvements to the northernmost freeway portion completed in 2013.

After the highway exits the National Forest, it continues for about 5 miles (8.0 km) through spruce forest, before passing the community of Girdwood. After about a mile, the highway enters Chugach State Park. The road continues through forest for about 10 miles (16 km) more, before passing the small skiing village of Bird. The route reenters the park for about a mile, before entering the village of Indian, and then reentering the forest. The Seward Highway passes along the coast of Cook Inlet for about 12 miles (19 km), with the Kenai Mountains running along the northern side. The highway then proceeds to enter the suburban area of Anchorage. The highway intersects Old Seward Highway, before becoming a four-lane freeway. The freeway's first exit is, in fact, for Old Seward Highway. The freeway continues past several neighborhoods, a plant nursery, and Rabbit Creek Elementary School.

At an exit for De Armoun Road, the highway's frontage road begins. The freeway continues past dozens of neighborhoods, a few small businesses, and provides exits for a few small roads, including the Minnesota Drive Expressway. After the exit for Abbott Road, part of the frontage road terminates. The route then passes through a more commercial area of Anchorage, passing several warehouses. At the freeway's final exit, for Tudor Road, the rest of the frontage roads either begin or terminate. The freeway ends at the highway's intersection with East 36th Avenue. About a half a mile (1 km) later, the highway splits into Ingra Street (northbound), and Gambell Street (southbound). The Seward Highway officially reaches its northern terminus at an intersection with 5th Avenue. AK-1 continues on for a short period as 5th Avenue, before becoming known as the Glenn Highway.

== History ==
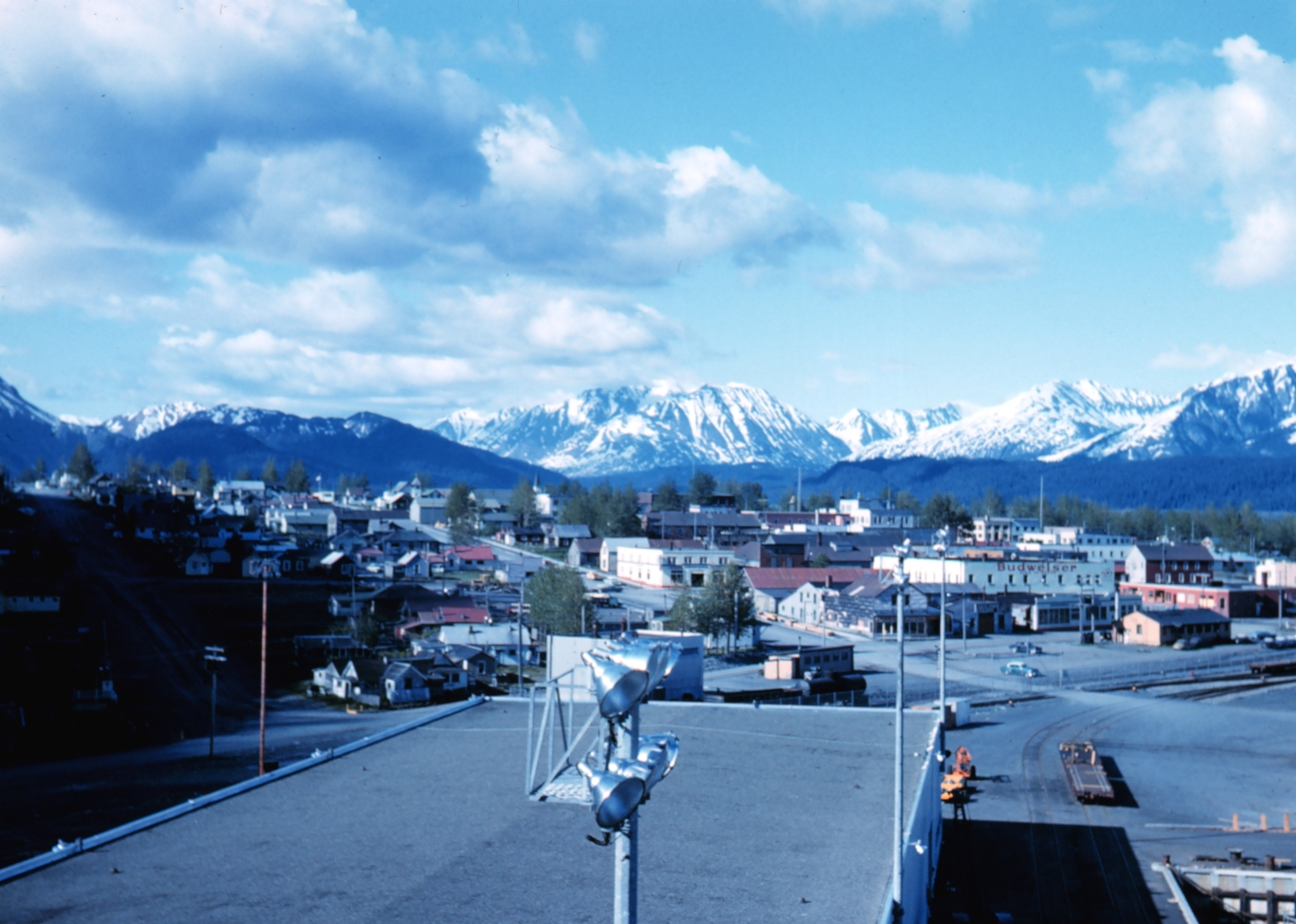
The southern terminus of the Seward Highway in 1959, as seen from aboard a ship docked at the Seward Harbor (which was moved following the 1964 earthquake).

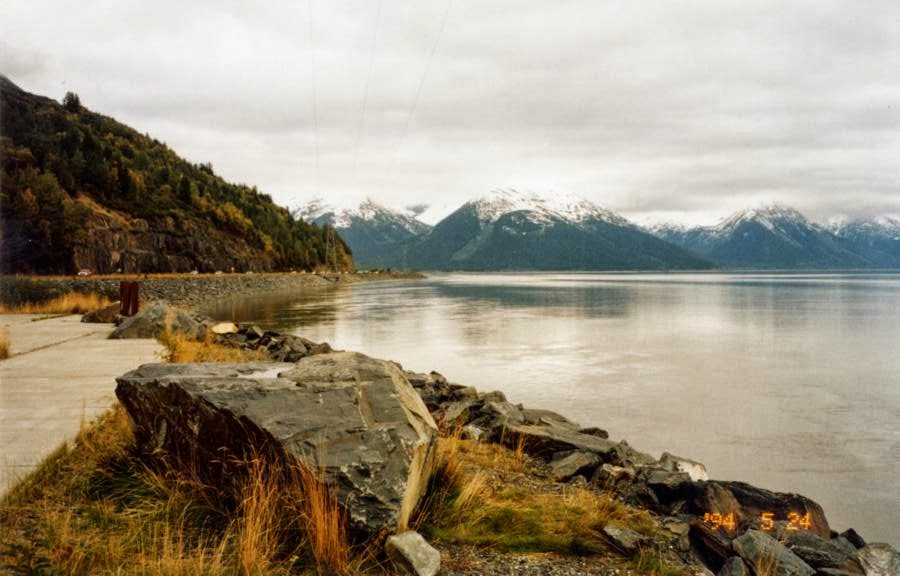
Near Bird Point

An 18-mile-long (29 km) stretch of the Seward Highway, traveling from Seward to Kenai Lake was completed in 1923. Another segment of the highway, running between Moose Pass and Hope, was completed in 1937. The Mile 18 bridge, nicknamed "The Missing Link", which would connect the Seward and Moose Pass portions, was not completed until 1946, which was a major cause of the delayed completion of the highway. The roadway was completed on October 19, 1951, connecting Seward to the major city of Anchorage by road for the first time (Seward was previously reached by sea, rail, or air). The entire length of the highway was paved in 1952. During the 1964 Alaska earthquake, about 20 miles (32 km) of the Seward Highway sank below the high water mark of Turnagain Arm; the highway and its bridges were raised and rebuilt in 1964–66.

The highway was designated a National Forest Scenic Byway by the United States Forest Service on September 8, 1989. Later, the State of Alaska added it to the State Scenic Byway system on January 29, 1993. The final designation was added on June 15, 2000, when the Seward Highway was named an All-American Road as part of the National Scenic Byway program by the United States Secretary of Transportation. The length of the highway traveling from the AK-1 and AK-9 intersection to the northern terminus is designated as Interstate A-3 by the National Highway System.

In July 2016, Alaska DOT&PF officials posted updated speed limits on a five-mile (8.0 km) section of the Seward Highway south of Anchorage between Hope Junction to the top of Turnagain Pass. The limit in the right lane is 55 mph (89 km/h), while that in the left lane is 65 mph (105 km/h). The project is designed to enhance safety and improve congestion by enforcing passing lane usage.

In 2017, Alaska DOT&PF announced a four-year Milepost 75–90 Rehabilitation Project, scheduled to begin in 2018, to make major safety improvements to a busy crash-prone section of the Seward Highway from Girdwood to beyond the Portage curve toward Turnagain Pass ending at Ingram Creek. In July 2015 a tour bus crash at milepost 79 killed one man and critically injured several others, causing a 10-hour traffic jam. During the summer months, up to 15,000 vehicles use this 15-mile (24 km) stretch of Seward Highway daily.

== Interstate Highway System ==
Interstate A-3
- Location: Soldotna to Anchorage
- Length: 238.38 mi (383.64 km)
- Existed: 1976–present

Seward Highway is part of the unsigned part of the Interstate Highway System as Interstate A-3.

== U.S. Bicycle Route 97 ==
United States Bicycle Route 97 is a U.S. Bicycle Route located along Alaska Route 1. The bike route runs alongside the Seward Highway along the entire length of the highway. The bike route was created in 2011.

== Major intersections ==
All exits are unnumbered.

Borough	Location	mi	km	Destinations	Notes
Kenai Peninsula	Seward	0.000	0.000	Railway Avenue	Southern terminus of Seward Highway and of AK-9
Kenai Peninsula	Seward	0.650	1.046	A Street	
Kenai Peninsula	Seward	1.468	2.363	Port Avenue	
Kenai Peninsula	Bear Creek	3.267	5.258	Nash Road	
Kenai Peninsula	Bear Creek	3.768	6.064	Herman Leirer Road (formerly Exit Glacier Road)	
Kenai Peninsula	Bear Creek	6.667	10.729	Bear Lake Road	
Kenai Peninsula	Primrose	16.970	27.311	Primrose Spur Road	
Kenai Peninsula	Moose Pass	28.845	46.422	Depot Road	
Kenai Peninsula	Moose Pass	32.125	51.700	Southern trailhead, Johnson Pass Trail	
Kenai Peninsula	Moose Pass	36.495– 37.110	58.733– 59.723	AK-1 (Sterling Highway) AK-9 south	Northern terminus of AK-9; Seward Highway assumes the AK-1 designation northbound; highway divides at Sterling Highway intersection
Kenai Peninsula		45.367	73.011	Summit Lake Lodge	
Kenai Peninsula		55.729	89.687	Hope Highway	Southern terminus of Hope Highway
Kenai Peninsula		67.461	108.568	Turnagain Pass—highway divides	
Kenai Peninsula		74.341	119.640	Ingram Creek bridge	
Municipality of Anchorage		78.040	125.593	Portage Glacier Highway	Western terminus of Portage Glacier Highway
Municipality of Anchorage		79.566	128.049	Alaska Railroad Portage siding	
Municipality of Anchorage		89.322	143.750	Alyeska Highway to Crow Creek Road	South end of Alyeska Highway; access to the Girdwood community
Municipality of Anchorage		100.016	160.960	Sawmill Road	Access to the Bird community
Municipality of Anchorage		103.064	165.865	Indian Road	Access to the Indian community
Municipality of Anchorage		110.863	178.417	McHugh Creek Campground Road	
Municipality of Anchorage		114.493	184.259	Potter Valley Road	
Municipality of Anchorage		116.782	187.942	East 154th Avenue	
Municipality of Anchorage		116.782	187.942	South end of freeway	
Municipality of Anchorage		117.175	188.575	Old Seward Highway; Rabbit Creek Road	
Municipality of Anchorage		117.656	189.349	De Armoun Road	Southbound exit and northbound entrance; southern end of Brayton Drive frontage road
Municipality of Anchorage		118.771	191.143	Huffman Road	
Municipality of Anchorage		119.803	192.804	O'Malley Road/Minnesota Drive	Southern terminus of O'Malley Road/Minnesota Drive
Municipality of Anchorage		121.314	195.236	East Dimond Boulevard; Abbott Road	Southern end of Homer Drive frontage road
Municipality of Anchorage		122.018	196.369	East 76th Avenue; Lore Road	Southbound exit and northbound entrance
Municipality of Anchorage		122.816	197.653	East Dowling Road	
Municipality of Anchorage		123.821	199.271	East Tudor Road	Northern end of Brayton Drive and Homer Drive frontage roads
Municipality of Anchorage		124.363	200.143	East 36th Avenue	Northern end of freeway, southern end of expressway
Municipality of Anchorage		124.752	200.769	East Benson Boulevard	One way eastbound
Municipality of Anchorage		124.877	200.970	East Northern Lights Boulevard	One way westbound
Municipality of Anchorage		125.059	201.263	East Fireweed Lane	
Municipality of Anchorage		125.336	201.709	AK-1 north (Gambell Street / Ingra Street) / East 20th Avenue	Northern end of expressway and AK-1 concurrency; Continuation of AK-1 splits into a one-way pair to downtown Anchorage
1.000 mi = 1.609 km; 1.000 km = 0.621 mi: Incomplete access; Route transition

== Old Seward Highway ==
Old Seward Highway
- Location: Anchorage
- Length: 7.943 mi (12.783 km)
- Existed: 1951–present

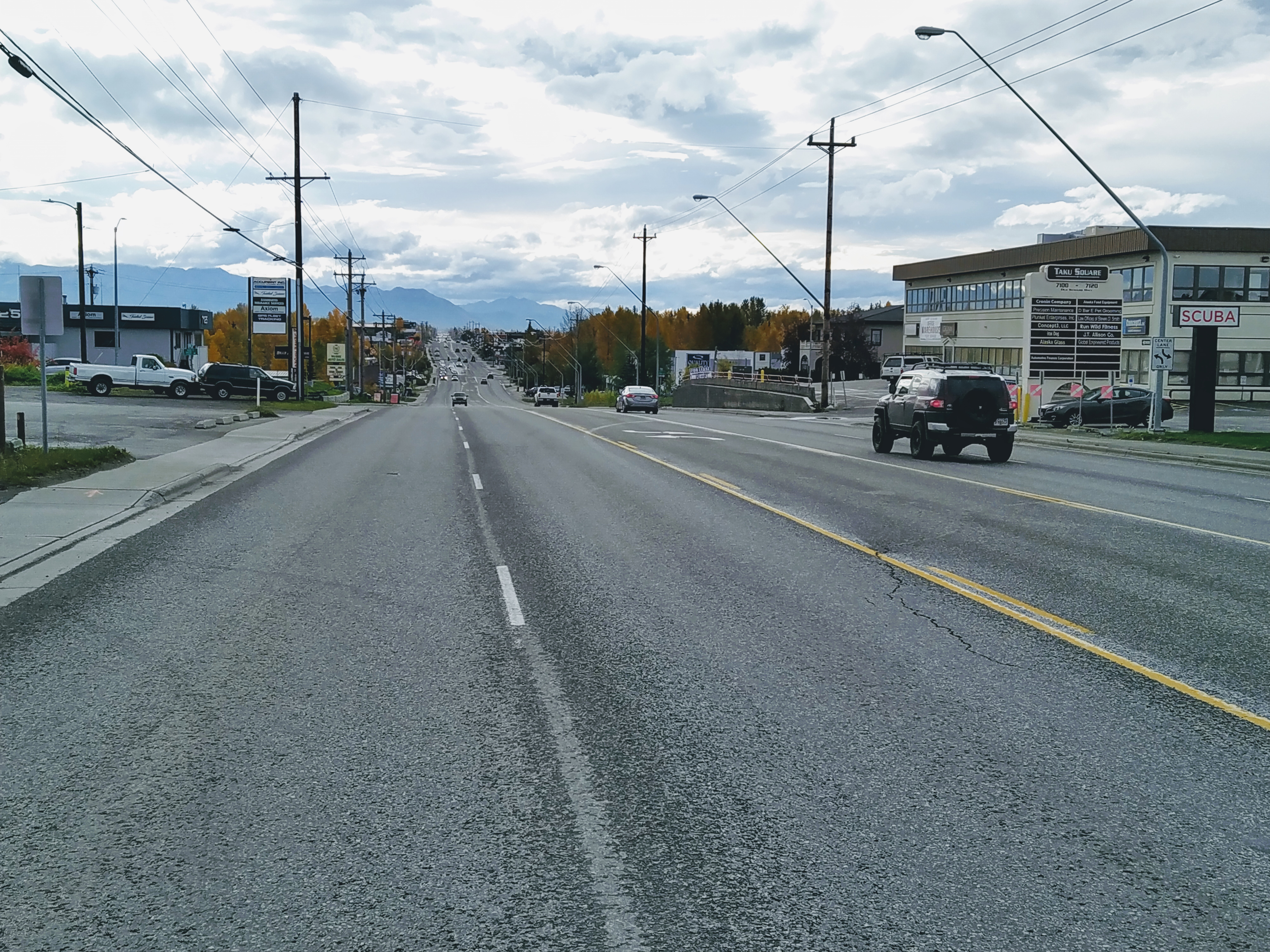
Old Seward Highway looking south from its intersection with East 70th Avenue, September 2020. The road follows a section line and offers two through lanes in each direction between East 36th Avenue and Huffman Road, a distance of 5.5 miles (8.9 km).

The Old Seward Highway is a nearly 8-mile-long (13 km) former routing of the Seward Highway. The road is located entirely within the corporate limits of Anchorage, with a southern terminus near the Potter Section House, and a northern terminus in the Midtown neighborhood. Both of this highway's termini are points on the Seward Highway. The highway was created in 1951, along with most of the current Seward Highway.

The Old Seward Highway begins at an intersection with Potter Valley Road, less than 500 feet from Potter Valley Road's own terminus with the (new) Seward Highway. From there, Old Seward Highway curves along the east side of Potter Marsh opposite the New Seward Highway (on the west side) before intersecting Rabbit Creek Road, again less than a 1/4 mile from the New Seward Highway, which is at this point a four-lane freeway. From there, Old Seward Highway travels northwest over the New Seward Highway and through the neighborhood of Oceanview. The route bends north, running parallel to the New Seward Highway. The roadway intersects O'Malley Road and continues northward through the Campbell/Taku neighborhood. The road proceeds north into Midtown, traveling through the neighborhood to the highway's northern terminus, an intersection with 33rd Avenue near the Moose's Tooth Pub and Pizzeria. An exit ramp from the New Seward Highway serves as the beginning of the southbound lanes.

The Old Seward Highway was created in 1951, as part of the original routing of the Seward Highway. Beginning in 1976, the state of Alaska designated three projects to reroute a large portion of the Seward Highway. This rerouting would bypass the section of the highway that is now the Old Seward Highway. The final portion of the rerouting was completed in early June 1998.

== See also ==
- List of Alaska Routes
- Chugach State Park
- Coastal Classic
