= Summit Lake =

Summit Lake may refer to several places:

== Lakes ==
=== Canada ===
- Summit Lake (Saskatchewan), a lake in Saskatchewan
- Summit Lake (Alberta), a lake in Alberta
- List of lakes named Summit Lake in British Columbia (includes some details about several other Summit Lakes in British Columbia, in addition to those listed immediately below)
  - Alta Lake (British Columbia) or Summit Lake
  - Gates Lake or Summit Lake, Southern Interior
  - Summit Lake (Crooked River), Central Interior
  - Summit Lake (Vancouver Island)
- Ontario
  - Algoma District
    - Summit Lake (Goudreau, Ontario)
    - Summit Lake (Josephine Creek)
    - Summit Lake (Kabinakagami River)
    - Summit Lake (Lochalsh River)
  - Summit Lake (Frontenac County)
  - Summit Lake (Kenora District)
  - Summit Lakes (Ontario), Nipissing District
  - Summit Lake (Rainy River District)
  - Summit Lake (Sudbury District)
  - Summit Lake (Thunder Bay District)
  - Summit Lake (Timiskaming District)
- Nunavut
  - Summit Lake (Akshayuk Pass, Auyuittuq National Park)

=== United States ===
- Summit Lake (Alaska), several lakes, including:
  - Summit Lake (Chugach National Forest)
  - Summit Lake (Paxson, Alaska)
  - Summit Lake (Willow, Alaska)
- Summit Lake (Reading Peak, Shasta County), California
- Summit Lake (Clear Creek County, Colorado)
- Summit Lake (Iowa)
- Summit Lake (Kandiyohi County, Minnesota)
- Summit Lake (Murray County, Minnesota)
- Summit Lake (Edmeston, Otsego County, New York)
- Summit Lake (Springfield, Otsego County, New York)
- Summit Lake (Oregon), several lakes
- Summit Lake (Washington)
- Summit Lake (West Virginia)
- Summit Lake (Langlade County, Wisconsin)

== Places ==
- Summit Lake, British Columbia
- Summit Lake, Maryland
- Summit Lake, Minnesota
- Summit Lake, Wisconsin
- Summit Lake camp

== See also ==
- Lake Summit, Winter Haven, Florida
- Summit Lake Park, Colorado
- Summit Lake Provincial Park, British Columbia
- Summit Lake Ski Area, Nakusp, British Columbia
- Summit Lake State Park, Henry County, Indiana
