= Trail Creek (Alaska) =

Stream near Moose Pass, Alaska, U.S.

Trail Creek Trail River
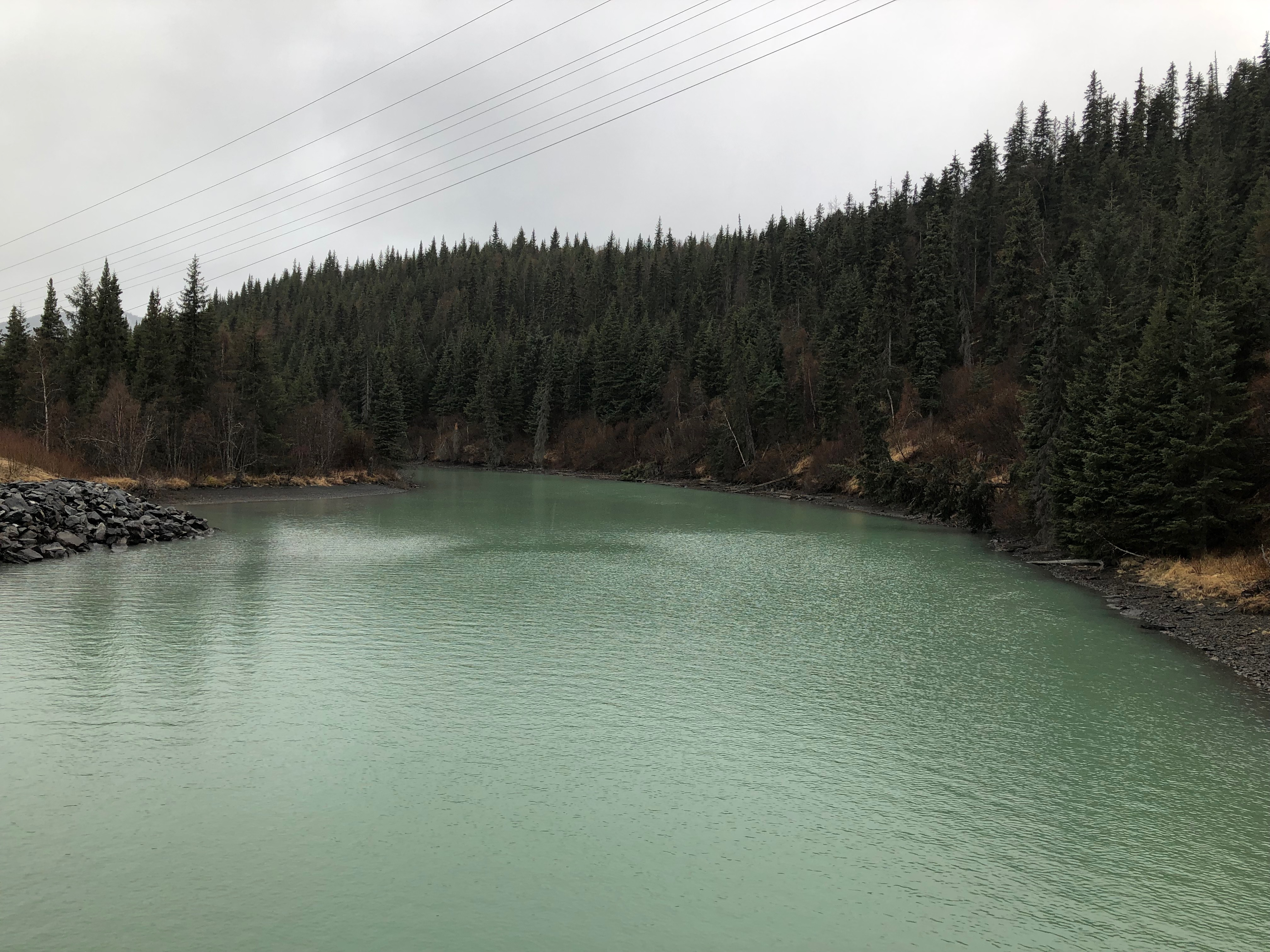
- Trail Creek near Moose Pass

Location
- Country: United States
- State: Alaska
- Region: Kenai Peninsula

Physical characteristics
- Source: Chugach Mountains
- Mouth: Kenai Lake
  - coordinates: 60°24′37″N 149°22′27″W

Basin features
- River system: Kenai River
- Waterbodies: Trail Lakes, Kenai Lake

Trail Creek also known as Trail River is a stream in the Chugach Mountains near Moose Pass, Alaska. It flows through the Trail Lakes and ends at Kenai Lake. There is a USFS campground near where the river empties into Kenai Lake, the river can be fished in the late summer for various species of trout.
