= Summit Lake (Alaska) =

Lake in the state of Alaska, United States

Lakes named Summit Lake in Alaska include:

- Lower Summit Lake (Chugach National Forest, Alaska) (just north of the [Upper] Summit Lake) 60.6610°N 149.4786°W
- Summit Lake (Becharof National Wildlife Refuge, Alaska) (near Kanatak Pass) 57.5873°N 156.0652°W
- Summit Lake (Chugach National Forest, Alaska) (also known as Upper Summit Lake)
- Summit Lake (Denali State Park, Alaska) (near Chulitna Pass) 62.9048°N 149.6088°W
- Summit Lake (Lake Clark National Park, Alaska) (near Lake Clark Pass) 60.7912°N 152.7928°W
- Summit Lake (Paxson, Alaska)
- Summit Lake (Prince of Wales Island, Alaska) 55.2310°N 132.5330°W
- Summit Lake (Willow, Alaska)
- Summit Lakes (Kenai Peninsula Borough, Alaska) (on the Chinkelyes Creek within the Chigmit Mountains) 59.7038°N 153.6865°W
- Summit Lake, the source of Tlikakila River in Kenai Peninsula Borough, Alaska (Chigmit Mountains) 60.785°N 152.7961°W
- Summit Lakes (Tongass National Forest, Alaska) (on the Phipps Peninsula near the shore of the Gulf of Alaska) 59.5105°N 139.7625°W

== See also ==
- Summit Lake (disambiguation)
