= Summit Lake (Chugach National Forest) =

Lake in the state of Alaska, United States

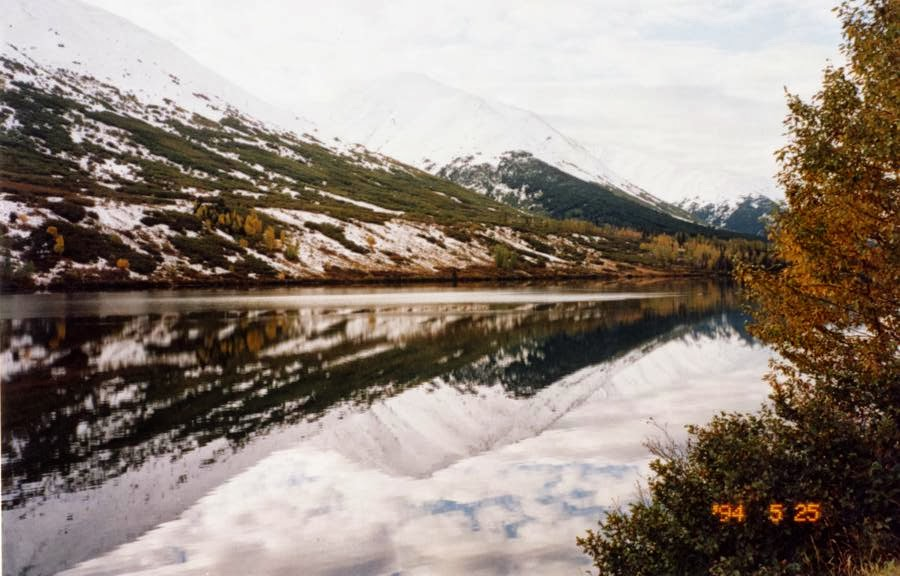
- Looking across Summit Lake from the edge of Seward Highway near Summit Lodge

- Location of Summit Lake within the State of Alaska
- Location: Chugach National Forest, Alaska; United States
- Coordinates: 60°37′53″N 149°30′31″W
- Type: Natural lake
- Primary inflows: Canyon Creek & Tenderfoot Creek
- Primary outflows: Canyon Creek
- Basin countries: United States
- Surface area: 258 acres (104 ha)
- Average depth: 48.1 feet (14.7 m)
- Max. depth: 70 feet (21 m)
- Water volume: 51,928,350 cubic yards (39,702,070 m^{3})
- Shore length^{1}: 3.3 miles (5.3 km)
- Surface elevation: 1,266 feet (386 m)
- ^{1} Shore length is not a well-defined measure.

Summit Lake (or Upper Summit Lake) is located on Canyon Creek in the Chugach National Forest, Alaska, United States and is situated along the Seward Highway (AK-1) 10 miles (16 km) north-northeast of Moose Pass and about 23 miles (37 km) southwest of the Portage area of Anchorage. The lake is fed by Canyon Creek from the southwest and Tenderfoot Creek from the east. The lake empties into Canyon Creek on the northeast, which flows through Lower Summit Lake, into Six Mile Creek, and eventually into the Turnagain Arm of the Cook Inlet. (However, the lake is not connected with the nearby Summit Creek, which runs about 1 mile [1.6 km] from the southwest shore of Summit Lake and whose waters flow southwest from the far side of the summit toward Kenai Lake and Skilak Lake before reaching the Cook Inlet.)

The Summit Lake Lodge is located just off the Seward Highway on the north shore of Summit Lake and the Tenderfoot Creek Campground is located directly south of the lodge, but on the east shore of the lake. A restoration of a former ski area has been proposed for the area as well, but has substantial obstacles that must be overcome before it can be rebuilt.

The lake has a natural population of both Dolly Varden and Lake trout, but is also stocked annually with fingerling Rainbow trout.

== Climate ==
Climate data for Summit Lake, Alaska, 2002–2020 normals: 1400ft (427m)
Month	Jan	Feb	Mar	Apr	May	Jun	Jul	Aug	Sep	Oct	Nov	Dec	Year
Record high °F (°C)	53 (12)	47 (8)	58 (14)	66 (19)	78 (26)	91 (33)	90 (32)	87 (31)	74 (23)	60 (16)	47 (8)	43 (6)	91 (33)
Mean maximum °F (°C)	39 (4)	41 (5)	46 (8)	56 (13)	71 (22)	78 (26)	80 (27)	77 (25)	64 (18)	52 (11)	40 (4)	38 (3)	82 (28)
Mean daily maximum °F (°C)	23.2 (−4.9)	29.1 (−1.6)	33.9 (1.1)	44.5 (6.9)	56.1 (13.4)	62.8 (17.1)	66.2 (19.0)	62.8 (17.1)	53.2 (11.8)	41.3 (5.2)	27.3 (−2.6)	25.2 (−3.8)	43.8 (6.6)
Daily mean °F (°C)	16.1 (−8.8)	20.4 (−6.4)	22.7 (−5.2)	33.8 (1.0)	43.8 (6.6)	50.8 (10.4)	54.9 (12.7)	52.4 (11.3)	44.2 (6.8)	34.1 (1.2)	20.6 (−6.3)	18.7 (−7.4)	34.4 (1.3)
Mean daily minimum °F (°C)	9.1 (−12.7)	11.7 (−11.3)	11.4 (−11.4)	23.2 (−4.9)	31.6 (−0.2)	38.8 (3.8)	43.6 (6.4)	42.0 (5.6)	35.1 (1.7)	26.8 (−2.9)	13.9 (−10.1)	12.2 (−11.0)	25.0 (−3.9)
Mean minimum °F (°C)	−15 (−26)	−10 (−23)	−8 (−22)	5 (−15)	23 (−5)	30 (−1)	36 (2)	32 (0)	23 (−5)	10 (−12)	−5 (−21)	−11 (−24)	−19 (−28)
Record low °F (°C)	−27 (−33)	−28 (−33)	−21 (−29)	−10 (−23)	16 (−9)	26 (−3)	29 (−2)	28 (−2)	17 (−8)	−4 (−20)	−17 (−27)	−23 (−31)	−28 (−33)
Average precipitation inches (mm)	2.31 (59)	2.16 (55)	1.71 (43)	1.26 (32)	1.75 (44)	1.31 (33)	2.07 (53)	3.17 (81)	4.48 (114)	4.12 (105)	2.95 (75)	3.38 (86)	30.67 (780)
Source 1: XMACIS2
Source 2: NOAA (Precipitation)

== See also ==
- Chugach National Forest
- Moose Pass, Alaska
- Seward Highway
- Summit Lake (Alaska)—disambiguation page
