= McNeil River =

River in Alaska, United States

McNeil River Falls
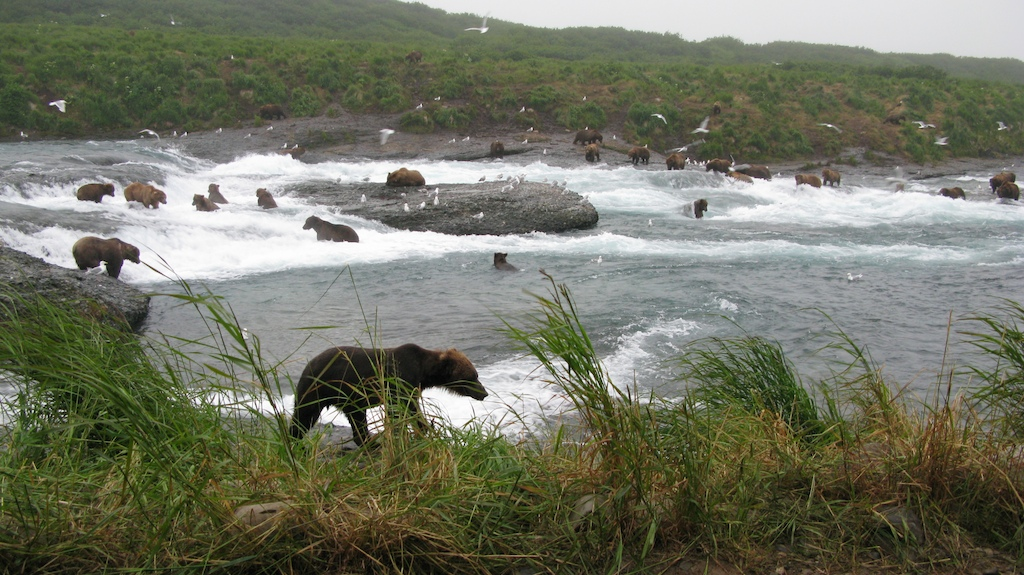
- Congregation of brown bears (Ursus arctos) at McNeil River Falls

- Location of the mouth of the McNeil River in Alaska

Location
- Country: United States
- State: Alaska
- Borough: Kenai Peninsula

Physical characteristics
- Source: Aleutian Range
  - coordinates: 58°55′48″N 154°40′04″W
  - elevation: 1,586 ft (483 m)
- Mouth: McNeil Cove, Kamishak Bay
  - location: 34 miles (55 km) southwest of Augustine Island
  - coordinates: 59°07′30″N 154°14′49″W
  - elevation: 0 ft (0 m)
- Length: 22 mi (35 km)

The McNeil River is a river on the eastern drainage of the Alaska Peninsula near its base and conjunction with the Alaska mainland. The McNeil emerges from glaciers and alpine lakes in the mountains of the Aleutian Range. The river's destination is the Cook Inlet in Alaska's southwest. The McNeil is the prime habitat of numerous animals, but it is famous for its salmon and brown bears. This wealth of wildlife was one of the reasons for the Alaska State Legislature's decision to designate the McNeil River a wildlife sanctuary in 1967. In 1993, this protected area was enlarged to preserve an area that has the highest concentration of brown bears anywhere in the world. According to the Alaska Department of Fish and Game, up to 144 brown bears have been sighted on the river in a single summer with 74 bears congregating in one place at a time Its entire length of 35 mi (56 km) lies within the McNeil River State Game Sanctuary, created in 1967 by the State of Alaska to protect the numerous Alaska brown bears who frequented the area. It also lies entirely within the Kenai Peninsula Borough boundaries. The McNeil River State Game Sanctuary and Refuge is part of a 3.8-million-acre (15,000 km^{2}) piece of land that is protected from hunting; the rest of this is Katmai National Park.

More famous for its bear population than for the size of the river or the strength of its salmon runs, McNeil River has been featured on many television and film documentaries. So well-known has the area become as a bear-viewing area, that in 1973 the State of Alaska began limiting the number of summer visitors to ten per day during peak visitor months of June, July and August. The area has also been "wired" for webcam remote viewing for those unable to access the river in person.

Various groups have been formed to support keeping the area pristine and free from bear-hunting activity. And while the bear population often wanders outside the protected zone their numbers have gradually continued to rise over the years.

== Geography ==
The McNeil River State Game Sanctuary and Refuge is located on the northeastern Alaskan Peninsula, next to the northeastern part of Katmai National Park and Preserve, about 250 miles (402 km) southwest of the city of Anchorage. The sanctuary and refuge protect about 388 square miles (248,000 acres, 100,362 hectares) of land. Of these, about 200 square miles (128,000 acres, 51,799 hectares), are in the sanctuary and 188 square miles (120,000 acres, 48,562 hectares), are in the refuge. The McNeil River runs through the middle part of the sanctuary north of Mikfik Creek and south of the Paint River drainage. The sanctuary is open to few activities other than wildlife viewing and camping and all hunting and fishing is prohibited there. Within the refuge, both fishing and sport hunting and trapping are allowed, but the hunting of brown bear is banned in both the sanctuary and refuge.

The northern edge of the refuge lies about 50 miles (80 km) south of the southern boundary of Lake Clark National Park and Preserve. The refuge is bounded to the west by Katmai National Preserve and the southern and western parts of the sanctuary are bordered by the rest of Katmai National Park. Much of the land is treeless, rolling tundra, but there are several mountainous areas in the southern part of the sanctuary. The nearest road ends 100 miles (161 km) away and access is only by boat or floatplane. Getting there requires extensive planning and booking.

== Fauna ==
=== Bears ===
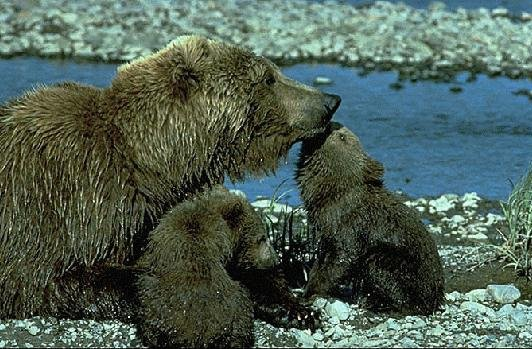
Mother brown bear with her cubs near the McNeil River

McNeil Falls has always been famous for its bear watching, and as early as 1955, when it was closed to hunting, it was featured in an article of National Geographic by Cecil E. Rhode and in the 1956 documentary The Animal World. Bear watching at the falls reached a low in the mid-1970s due to limited rules and human interference, but with better rules, bear numbers increased. As many as 100 bears may be seen at the falls in a single day with frequent sights of 60 or more at one time. Visitors often view bears as they stand at the falls waiting to catch salmon in their mouths. In addition to the main McNeil River, Mikfik Creek to the south and Chenik Lake to the north, in the refuge, also provide bear viewing. Both Mikfik Creek and Chenik Lake offer best bear viewing in June and McNeil River does in July.

Visiting McNeil is difficult. To visit the sanctuary and refuge, a person must win a lottery system that allows only 10 people per day for a four-day period to visit McNeil and the bears. This is a very effective way to protect the bears and is the main reason why there are so many bears at McNeil. The McNeil Camp comprises eight ranger cabins and eating areas and a tent camp just beyond.

=== Salmon ===
Chum salmon are the main salmon species that attract bears to the McNeil River. About 50,000 of them enter the drainage, the majority in July. The salmon feed bears and other carnivores such as foxes and wolves. Bears feed primarily on salmon in July but switch their diet to berries and grass in late August and early September. To reduce the impact of humans on bears, fishing is prohibited.

=== Other animals ===
Aside from its famous brown bears, the McNeil River Sanctuary also has moose, caribou, wolves, red foxes, wolverines, harbor seals, and bald eagles. None are encountered as frequently as the bears, but patient observers may observe any of them if lucky.

== History ==
McNeil River has had a long history in protecting its unique resources and the bears. This story began in the 1940s when the site was discovered. People were not only attracted to see the bears, but also to hunt and fish there. Hunters were challenged with hunting the bears because of the unique nature of the area and of how many bears there were. The hunting was regulated over the years, and when Cecil E. Rhode visited in 1954, he asked the Territory of Alaska to close the river to hunting; in one day he counted 32 bears. In 1955, the entire drainage was closed to brown bear hunting. Twelve years later, the area was further protected in a bill signed by Alaska Governor Jay Hammond and became the McNeil River State Game Sanctuary. The sanctuary protected about 93,000 acres and bear numbers visiting the falls grew. However, around 1970 bear numbers began to fall again because of humans getting in bears' space, fishing feet from them, and disturbing them. So new rules were set up in 1973 and bear numbers once again increased. For 20 years, no major events happened and bear numbers at the falls grew to about 60. However, it was discovered in 1993 that a fish ladder would be constructed in the Paint River drainage, just 3 miles (4.8 km) from McNeil Falls. Because it was required to have about 500,000 salmon spawn and die in the Paint River drainage, it was feared that bears would be drawn away from McNeil Falls and be in that drainage during bear hunting season. The Friends of McNeil River filled out a lawsuit that expanded the sanctuary to 128,000 acres (52,000 ha) and established the 120,000-acre (49,000 ha) McNeil River State Game Refuge. The refuge was closed to hunting in 1995.

However, the issues did not end. In 2000, the McNeil Refuge was opened to hunting by the Board of Game. It was closed to hunting again in 2005 because of pressure from conservationists, but there was a proposal that would allow bear hunting in 2007. Support by Alaskan governor Sarah Palin pressured the conservationists, but they were finally able to close the refuge to hunting again in March 2007. The bear numbers boomed at McNeil Falls (the record of 74 were counted that year!).

== See also ==
- List of rivers of Alaska
