= Summit Lake Provincial Park =

Provincial park in British Columbia, Canada

- IUCN category II (national park)
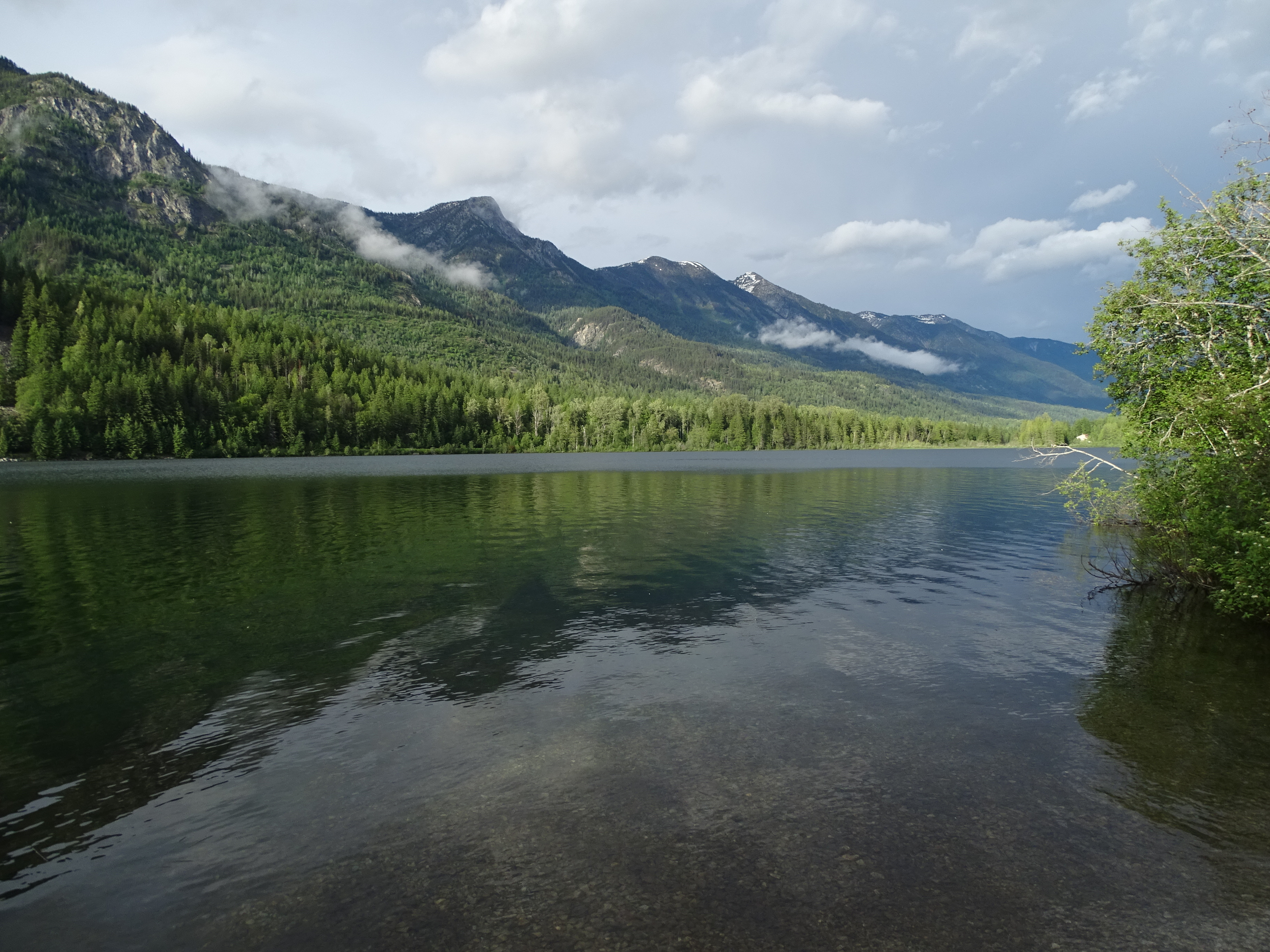
- Summit Lake

- Location within British Columbia
- Interactive map of Summit Lake Provincial Park
- Location: Central Kootenay, British Columbia, Canada
- Coordinates: 50°09′24″N 117°39′17″W
- Area: 6 ha (15 acres)
- Designation: Class C Provincial Park
- Established: February 4, 1964
- Governing body: BC Parks

Summit Lake Provincial Park is a Class C provincial park located southeast of the community of Summit Lake in the Central Kootenay region of British Columbia, Canada.

== Geography ==
The park sits atop a small peninsula located on the western shore of Summit Lake. The lake is surrounded by the Nakusp Range of the Selkirk Mountains, which rises 500 metres above the lake.

== Recreation ==
Park visitors can enjoy fishing for rainbow and cutthroat trout or swimming in the lake's clear, refreshing mountain water. Mountain Goats can often be viewed on rocky outcroppings and each fall a natural spectacle occurs as thousands of toads emerge from the lake and migrate to the nearby forest to hibernate for the winter.
