= Summit Lake Township, Nobles County, Minnesota =

Summit Lake Township, Minnesota
- Township
- Location within the state of Minnesota Summit Lake Township, Minnesota (the United States)
- Coordinates: 43°43′9″N 95°44′40″W
- Country: United States
- State: Minnesota
- County: Nobles

Area
  - Total: 36.1 sq mi (93.6 km^{2})
  - Land: 36.1 sq mi (93.6 km^{2})
  - Water: 0 sq mi (0.0 km^{2})
- Elevation: 1,680 ft (512 m)

Population (2000)
  - Total: 368
  - Density: 10/sq mi (3.9/km^{2})
- Time zone: UTC-6 (Central (CST))
  - Summer (DST): UTC-5 (CDT)
- FIPS code: 27-63400
- GNIS feature ID: 0665737

Summit Lake Township is a township in Nobles County, Minnesota, United States. The population was 368 at the 2000 census.

== Geography ==
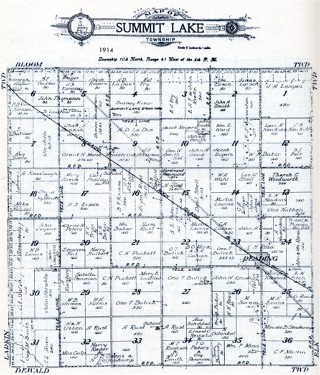
Summit Lake Township - 1914

According to the United States Census Bureau, the township has a total area of 36.2 square miles (93.6 km^{2}), all land. The main geographic feature of Summit Lake Township is the Buffalo Ridge, a drainage divide between the Mississippi and Missouri River systems. Other geographic features include the Kanaranzi Creek, which flows westward to the Missouri River via the Big Sioux River, and the Jack Creek, which flows eastward to the Mississippi River via the Des Moines River. Summit Lake once existed in section 11 of the township, but was drained in subsequent years. If the lake existed today, it would have the highest elevation of any body of water within the state of Minnesota.

Main highways include:

- Minnesota State Highway 264

(Discontinued - renamed Nobles County Road 25)

- Nobles County Road 25
- Nobles County Road 13
- Nobles County Road 14

== History ==
Organization of Summit Township was approved by the Nobles County Board on May 20, 1873. The first township meeting was held on June 5, 1873. The original name of the township was Wilson Township. However, the county board was informed by the state auditor's office that another Wilson Township existed elsewhere in the state. The township was briefly renamed Akin Township on June 15, 1874, but once again, the county was informed that another Akin Township existed within the state. On July 27, 1874, the township was given its present name of Summit Lake Township in honor of a lake in section 11 of the township. Presently, two Wilson Townships currently exist within Minnesota, one in Cass County and the other in Winona County. There is no Akin Township anywhere within the state. Summit Lake, the namesake of the township, no longer exists having been drained and lost in the passing years.

== Demographics ==
As of the census of 2000, there were 368 people, 131 households, and 104 families residing in the township. The population density was 10.2 people per square mile (3.9/km^{2}). There were 138 housing units at an average density of 3.8/sq mi (1.5/km^{2}). The racial makeup of the township was 96.20% White, 0.82% African American, 0.54% Native American, 1.36% from other races, and 1.09% from two or more races. Hispanic or Latino of any race were 1.90% of the population.

There were 131 households, out of which 39.7% had children under the age of 18 living with them, 72.5% were married couples living together, 3.1% had a female householder with no husband present, and 20.6% were non-families. 18.3% of all households were made up of individuals, and 8.4% had someone living alone who was 65 years of age or older. The average household size was 2.81 and the average family size was 3.22.

In the township the population was spread out, with 31.0% under the age of 18, 5.2% from 18 to 24, 28.8% from 25 to 44, 22.8% from 45 to 64, and 12.2% who were 65 years of age or older. The median age was 36 years. For every 100 females, there were 87.8 males. For every 100 females age 18 and over, there were 96.9 males.

The median income for a household in the township was $38,958, and the median income for a family was $43,250. Males had a median income of $26,023 versus $19,196 for females. The per capita income for the township was $13,955. About 4.2% of families and 6.9% of the population were below the poverty line, including 10.8% of those under age 18 and 5.3% of those age 65 or over.

== Politics ==
Summit Lake Township is located in Minnesota's 1st congressional district, represented by Mankato educator Tim Walz, a Democrat. At the state level, Summit Lake Township is located in Senate District 22, represented by Republican Doug Magnus, and in House District 22A, represented by Republican Joe Schomacker.

== Local politics ==
Summit Lake Township is represented by Nobles County Commissioner Marvin Zylstra
