= Russian River (Alaska) =

River in the United States of America

Coordinates: 60°29′12″N 150°00′02″W

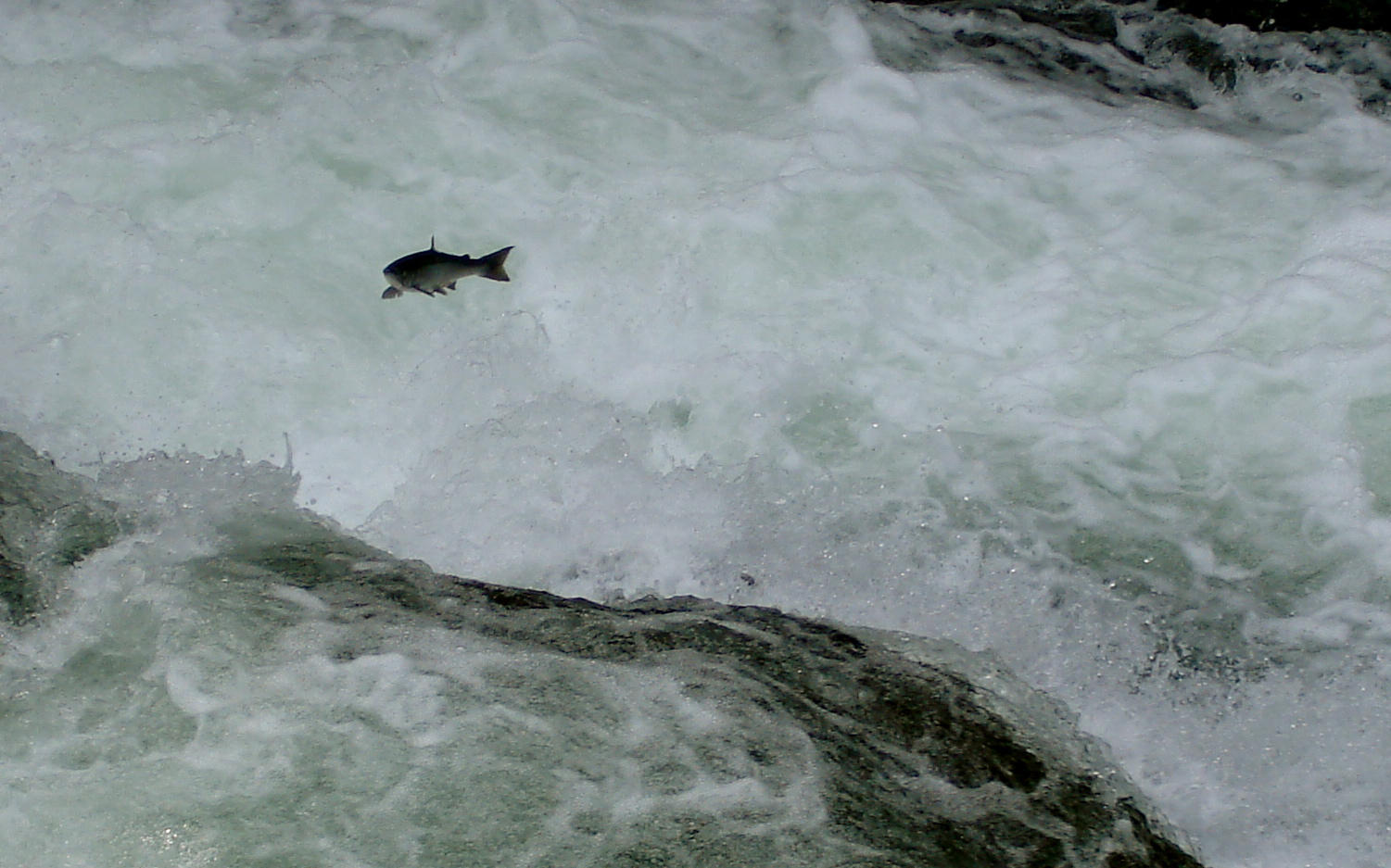
Russian River
Salmon jumping in the Russian River
Location:	Kenai Peninsula, Alaska
Depth:	Shallow
Famous for:	Fishing, especially Salmon

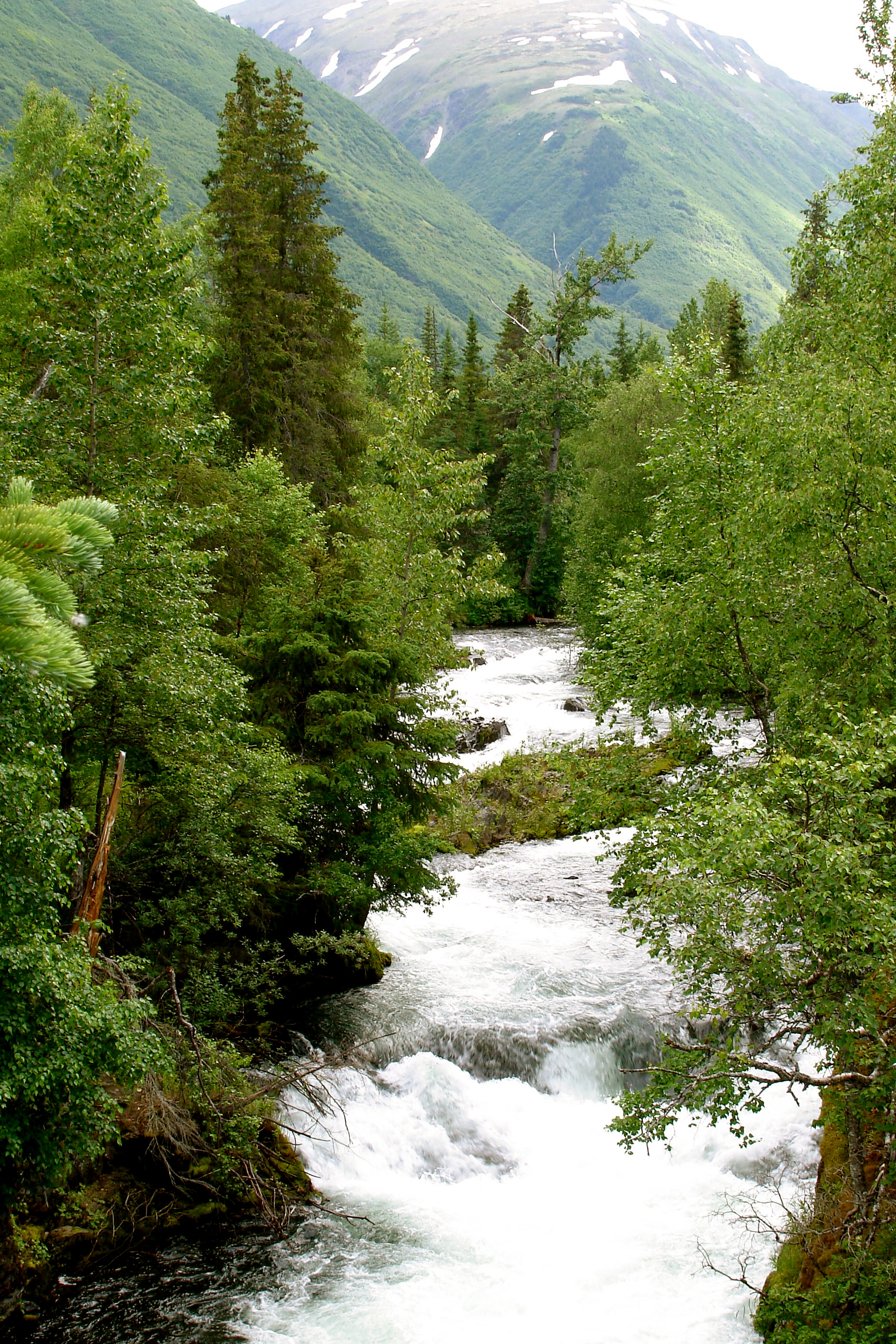
Looking up the Russian River

The Russian River (Russian: Рашен-Ривер) is a 13-mile-long (21-kilometer) river on the Kenai Peninsula in the U.S. state of Alaska. It flows northward from Upper Russian Lake in the Kenai Mountains through Lower Russian Lake, draining into the Kenai River near the town of Cooper Landing. The native Denaina people called this river Chunuk'tnu.

Like the Kenai, the Russian River is famous for its fishing, especially for salmon. There are two runs of sockeye salmon each year, in mid-June and mid-July, and a run of silver salmon in August.

There is no direct road access to the river. It can be accessed either by hiking in from several Parking lots in the Russian River Campground (1/2 mile beyond Gwin's Lodge at Milepost 52) or by the Russian River ferry that crosses the Kenai and takes fishermen to the mouth of the Russian. There is a parking and ferry fee. The first parking lot in the Russian River Campground (past the toll booth, lot on the left) is the 2.3 mile walk to the Russian River Falls. This is a moderate relatively flat walk to great viewing platforms of the falls. Bears frequently fish below the falls, and further down stream.

== See also ==
- List of Alaska rivers
