= Kenai Lake =

Lake in the state of Alaska, United States

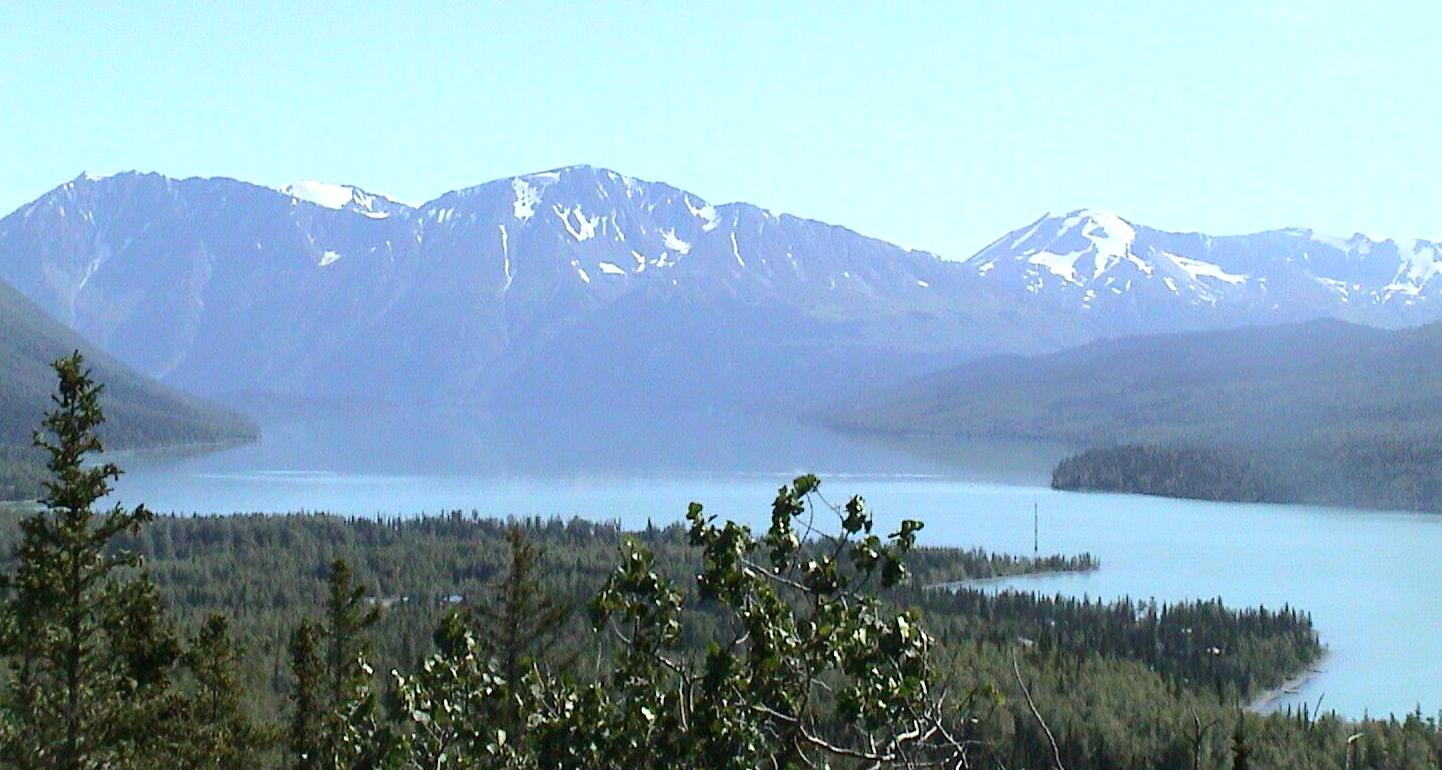
- North Kenai lake near Cooper Landing

- Location within Alaska Location within North America
- Location: Kenai Peninsula, Alaska
- Coordinates: 60°23′32″N 149°34′24″W
- Type: Natural Freshwater
- Primary inflows: Snow River, Trail River
- Primary outflows: Kenai River
- Basin countries: United States
- Max. length: 22 mi (35 km)
- Surface area: 13,813 acres (5,590 ha)
- Average depth: 299 ft (91 m)
- Max. depth: 569 ft (173 m)
- Surface elevation: 433 ft (132 m)
- Settlements: Cooper Landing, Primrose

Kenai Lake (Dena'ina: Sqilan Bena) is a large, "zig-zag" shaped lake on the Kenai Peninsula, Alaska. The lake forms the headwaters of the Kenai River, and is itself a destination for fishing and other outdoor activity. The Dena'ina call the lake Sqilan Bena, meaning "ridge lake place". Due to its size and shape it is accessible from both the Sterling Highway and the Seward Highway.

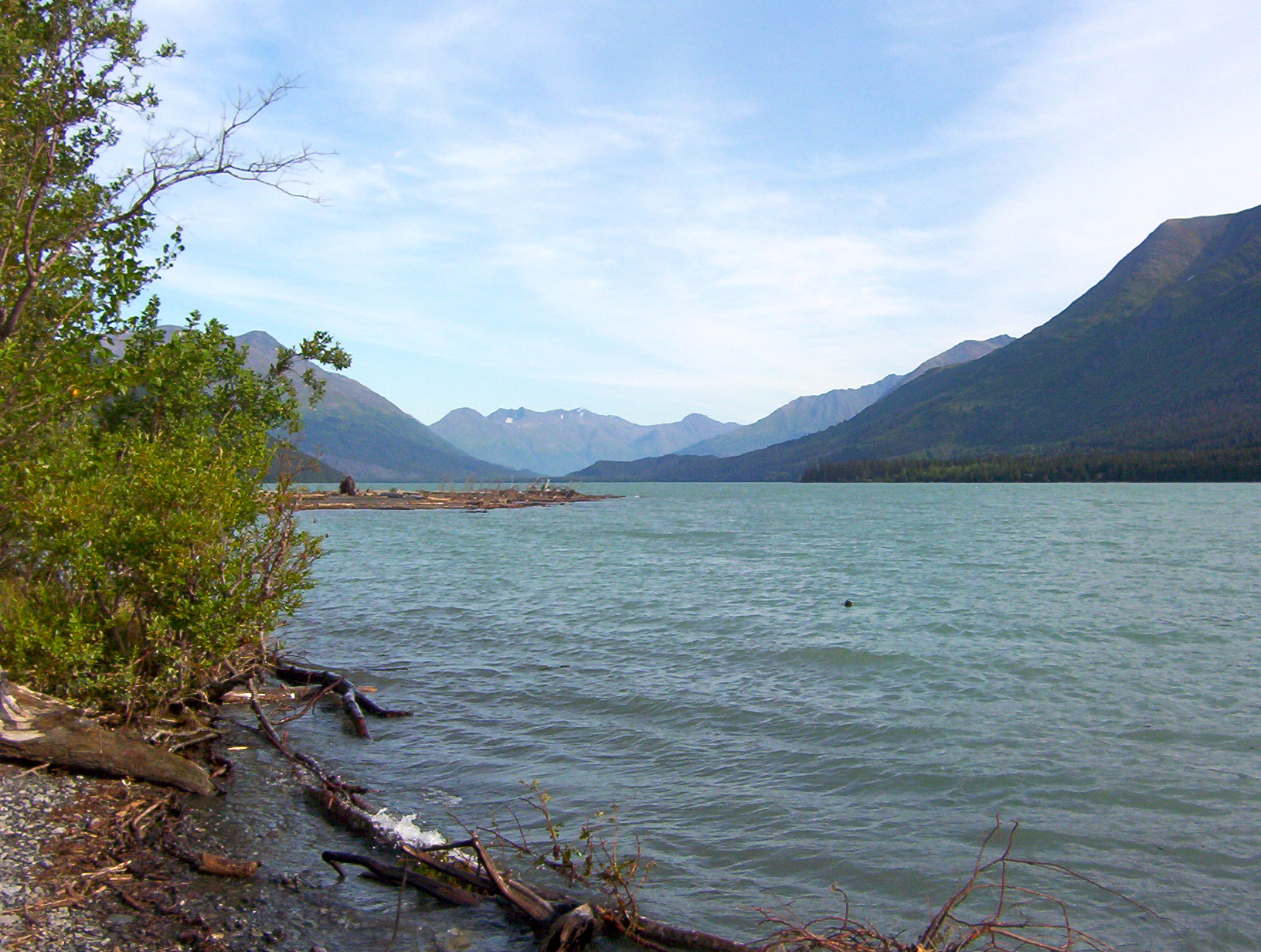
South end of Kenai Lake near Primrose

== See also ==
- List of lakes of Alaska
- Lake Grouse
