= Cecil E. Rhode =

American journalist

- Born: July 7, 1902; Mohall, Renville County, North Dakota, United States
- Died: December 3, 1979 (aged 77); Cooper Landing, Kenai Peninsula Borough, Alaska
- Occupations: Filmmaker, photographer, naturalist, hunter, journalist, writer for National Geographic, Sports Afield, gold miner
- Spouse: Helen E. Rhode

Cecil E. Rhode (July 7, 1902 – December 3, 1979) was an American wildlife photographer, film producer and journalist known for his work about wildlife in Alaska, particularly in National Geographic. Active professionally from 1933 until his death, Rhode was best known for bringing wide exposure to the public about the wilds of Alaska. While Rhode's primary income was from film and photography, he also made a significant portion of his living from panning for gold and from selling crabs and other game.

Rhode was the older brother of Leo Franklin Rhode (1908–2002), who came to Alaska with Cecil in 1933 and also settled on the Kenai Peninsula. Leo Rhode served as a business, civic and political leader in Homer for many decades.

In 1952, Rhode visited the McNeil River and recognized its ecological importance. He visited again in 1954, gathering photographs that led to his August 1954 feature article When Giant Bears Go Fishing in National Geographic as well as the September 1955 Outdoor Life I lived with the Bears. While Rhode published a trove of pictures and descriptions for these and other publications, he refused to disclose the specific location in print. For the next year he lobbied for the McNeil River to be set aside as a protected reserve, which was accomplished in 1955. The mountain overlooking his Cooper Landing home of 42 years was named Cecil Rhode Mountain in 1981. His colored movies were described by the National Park Service as the "finest and most authentic game pictures ever filmed in Alaska". He also filmed the documentary Great Bear Trout in the Great Bear Lake, which featured his catch of a 62-pound trout. Among his films were Alaska Afield, Great Bear Trout, Alaskan Angling, and Alaskan Game Trails.
