= Cecil Rhode Mountain =

Mountain summit in the state of Alaska

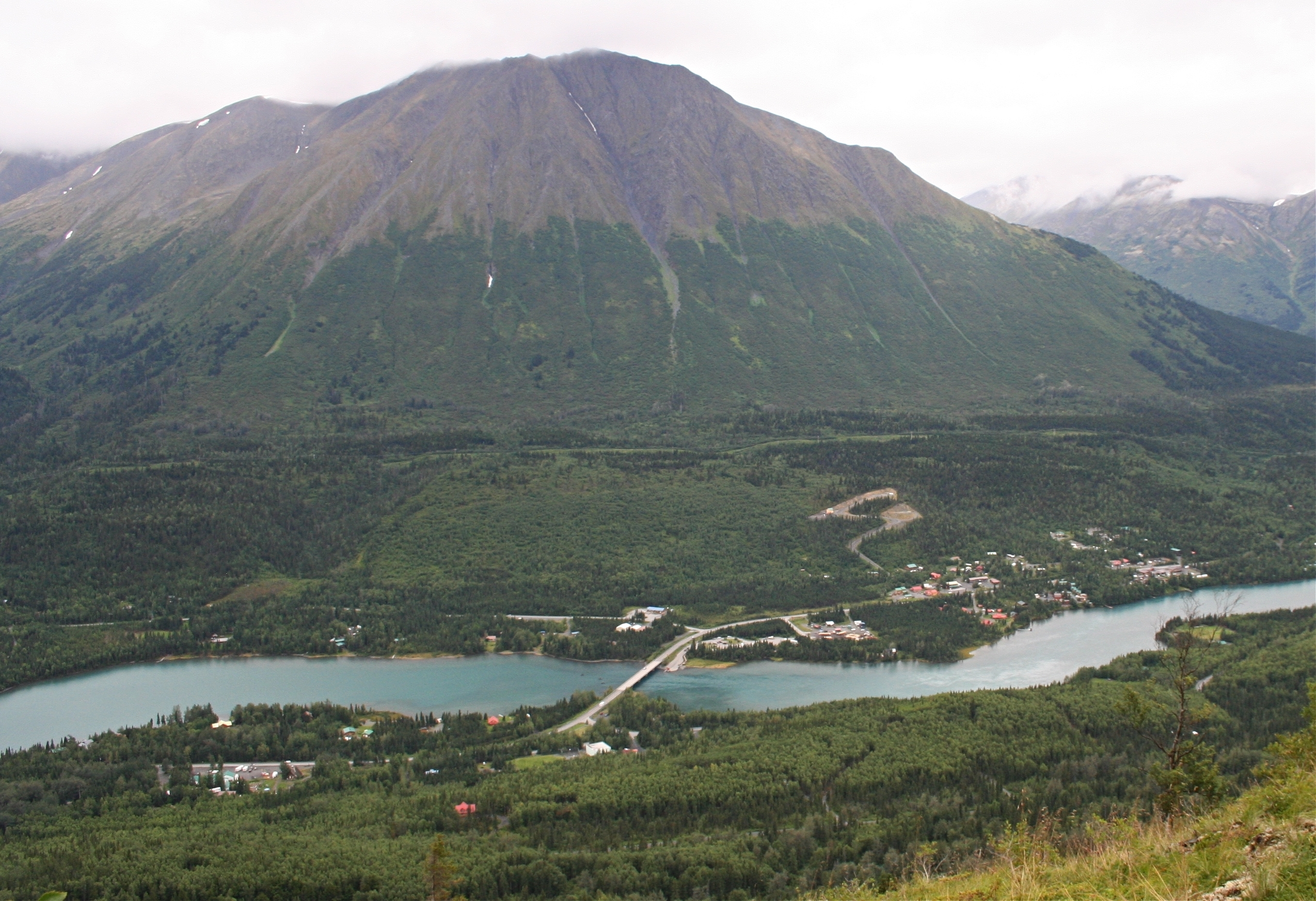
- North aspect, from Slaughter Ridge (Cooper Landing and Kenai Lake below)

Highest point
- Elevation: 4,400 ft (1,300 m)
- Prominence: 50 ft (15 m)
- Isolation: 0.33 mi (0.53 km)
- Coordinates: 60°27′58″N 149°49′09″W

Naming
- Etymology: Cecil E. Rhode

Geography
- Location within Alaska
- Interactive map of Cecil Rhode Mountain
- Country: United States
- State: Alaska
- Borough: Kenai Peninsula
- Protected area: Chugach National Forest
- Parent range: Kenai Mountains
- Topo map: USGS Seward B-8

Climbing
- Easiest route: Hike from Western ridge off Cooper Dam Rd.

Cecil Rhode Mountain is a 4,400-foot (1,341 m) mountain summit located in the Kenai Mountains, on the Kenai Peninsula in the state of Alaska. The mountain is situated in Chugach National Forest, 50 mi (80 km) south of Anchorage, and 1.7 mi (3 km) south of Cooper Landing, Alaska. This peak is shown on maps as Cooper Benchmark, the northernmost peak on a ridge which includes Stetson Benchmark (4,576 ft), and Peak 4593.

The mountain was named for Cecil E. Rhode (1902–1979), director of the Izaak Walton League, wildlife photographer, and writer who lived in Cooper Landing for 42 years and was best known for bringing wide exposure to the public about the wilds of Alaska, particularly in magazines such as National Geographic, Sports Afield, and Outdoor Life. The mountain's toponym was officially adopted on August 13, 1981, by the United States Board on Geographic Names.

The mountain summit is accessible by trail on the Western ridge. Hikers can drive up Cooper Dam Rd. and find a trail accessible on the left side if driving Southbound. It is roughly a 4-mile hike round trip and gains roughly 3,300 ft in elevation.

Precipitation runoff from the mountain drains into the Kenai River.

== Climate ==
Based on the Köppen climate classification, Cecil Rhode Mountain is located in a subarctic climate zone with long, cold, snowy winters, and mild summers. Winter temperatures can drop below −20 °C with wind chill factors below −30 °C. This climate supports a spruce and hemlock forest on the lower slopes.

== Gallery ==
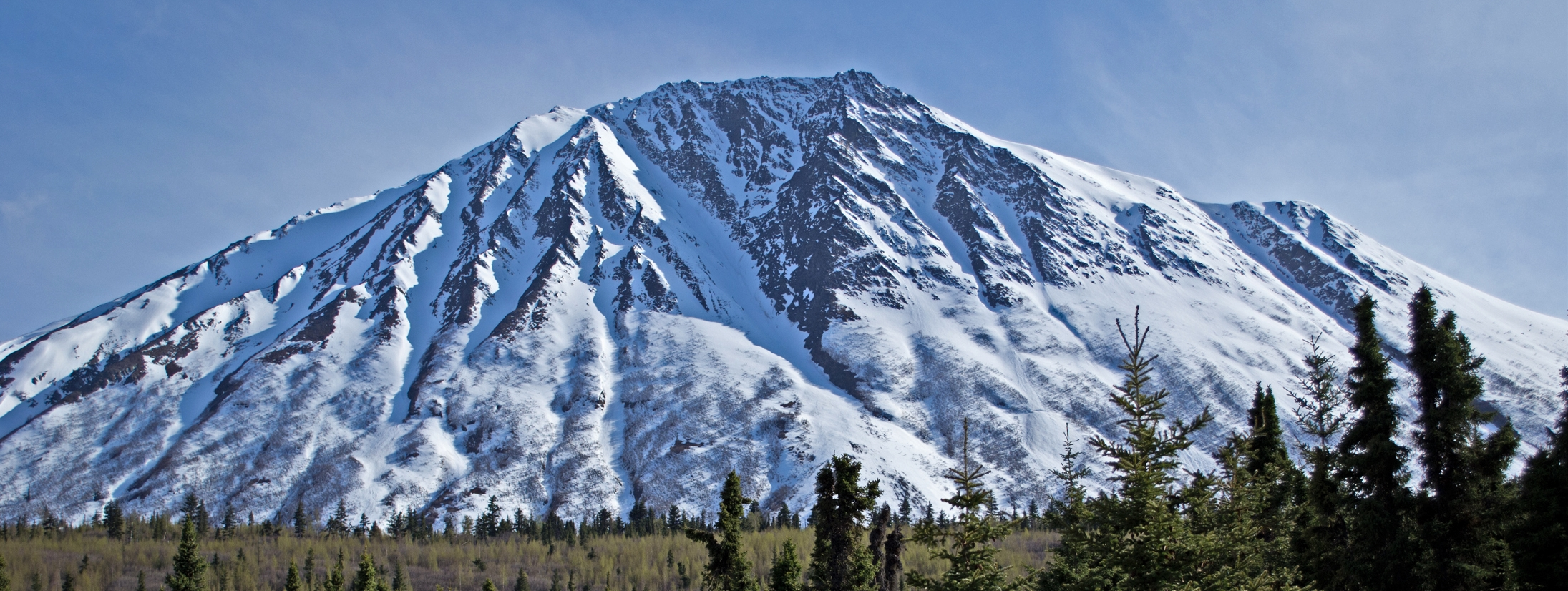
Cecil Rhode Mountain

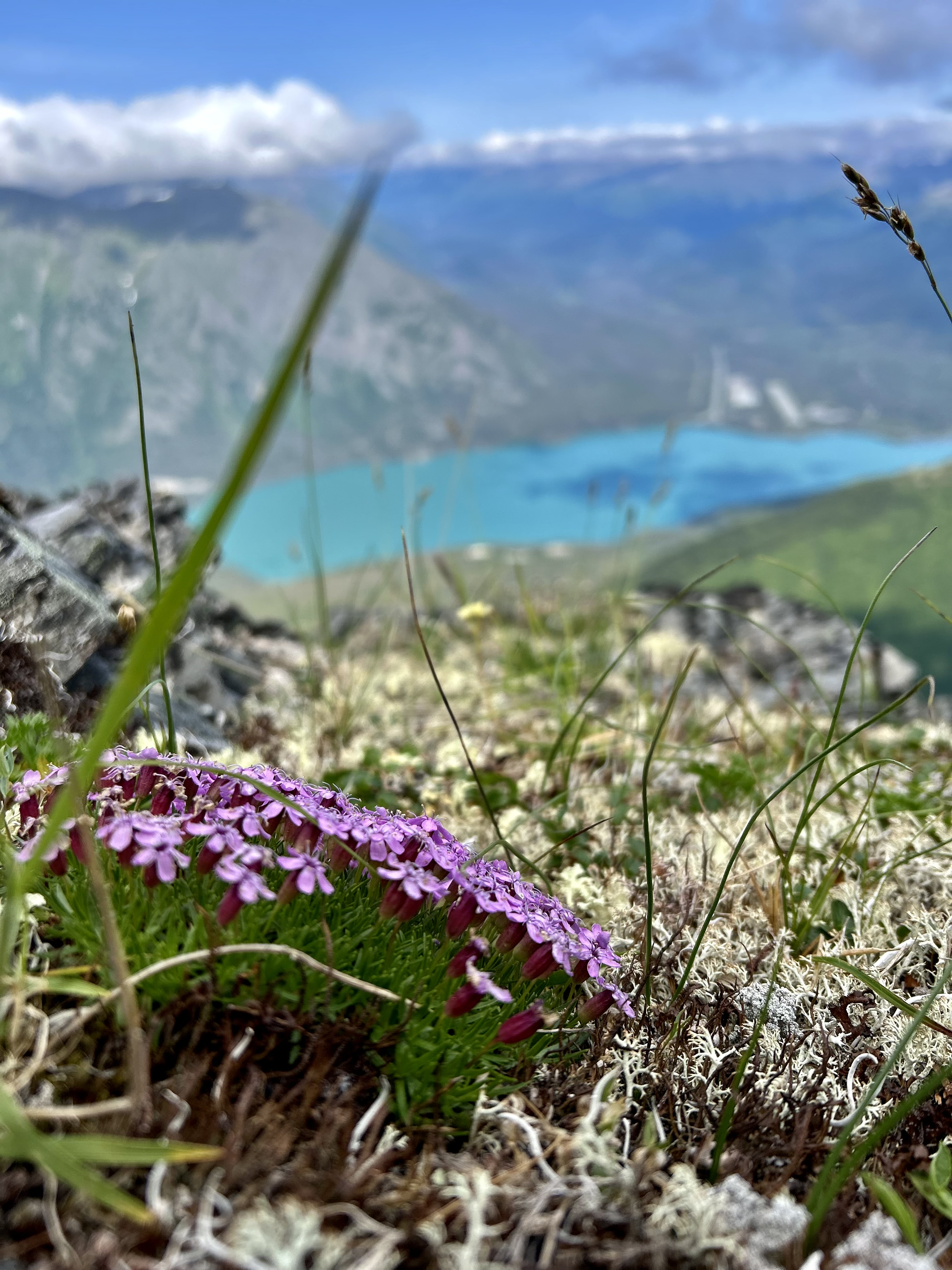
The summit of Cecil Rhode Mountain with Kenai Lake in the background.

== See also ==
- List of mountain peaks of Alaska
- Geology of Alaska
