= Summit Lake (Josephine Creek) =

Lake in Algoma District, Ontario, Canada

- Location within Ontario
- Location: Unorganized North Part, Algoma District, Ontario
- Coordinates: 48°06′29″N 84°37′45″W
- Primary outflows: Unnamed creek to Bog Lake
- Basin countries: Canada
- Max. length: 0.6 km (0.37 mi)
- Max. width: 0.2 km (0.12 mi)
- Surface elevation: 376 m (1,234 ft)

Summit Lake is a lake in the Magpie River system in Unorganized North Part of Algoma District, Ontario, Canada in the Lake Superior drainage basin. It is about 0.6 kilometres (0.4 mi) long and 0.2 kilometres (0.1 mi) wide, lies at an elevation of 376 metres (1,234 ft). There are no significant inflows, and the primary outflow is an unnamed creek to Bog Lake, which eventually flows via Josephine Creek and the Magpie River into Lake Superior. The lake is about 5 kilometres (3 mi) northwest of the community of Hawk Junction and 16 kilometres (10 mi) northeast of Wawa. The Algoma Central Railway branch line to Michipicoten makes a loop, between Hawk Junction and Magpie, south of the lake.

== See also ==
- List of lakes in Ontario
