= Cooper Landing, Alaska =

- Census-designated place
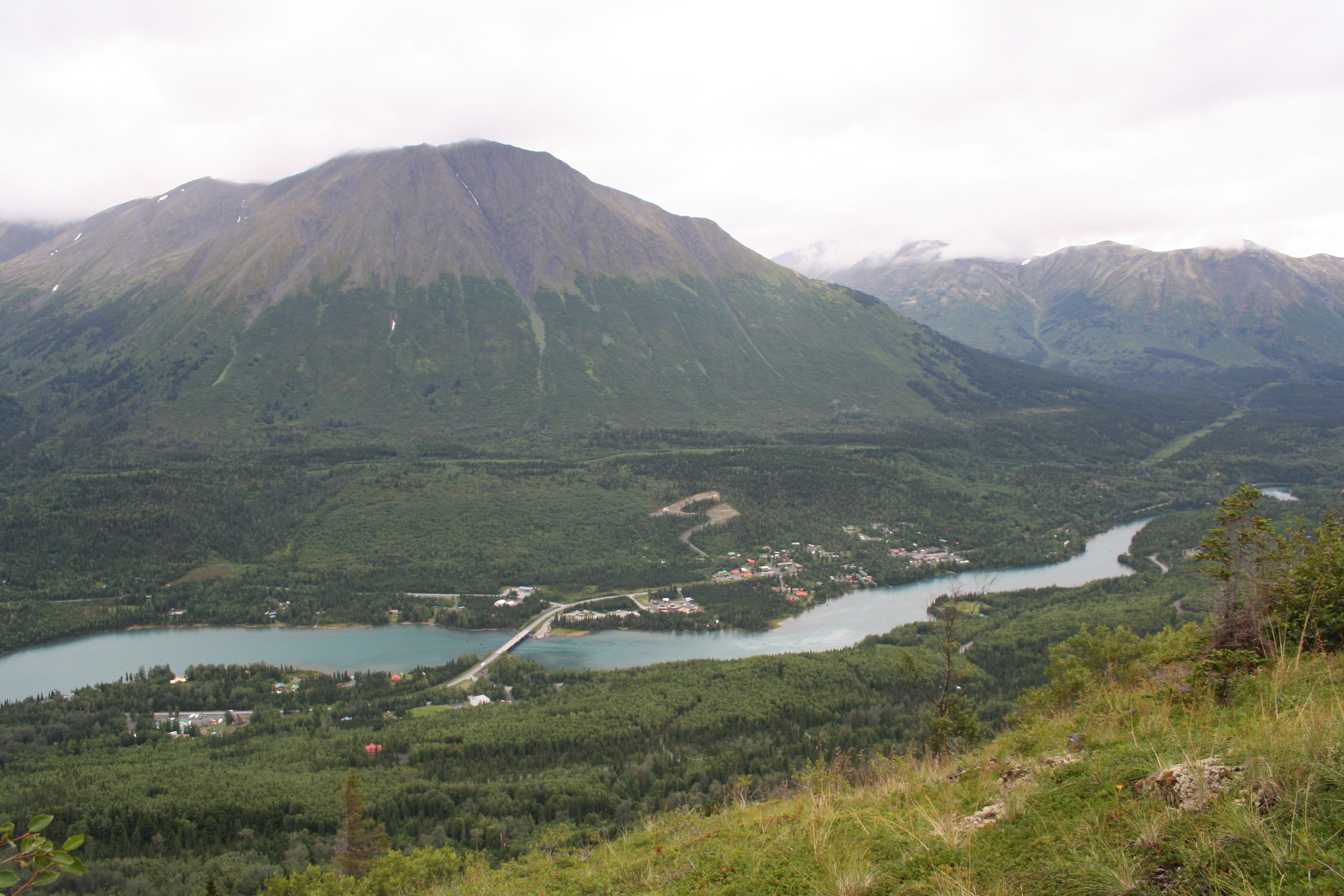
- Cooper Landing below Cecil Rhode Mountain

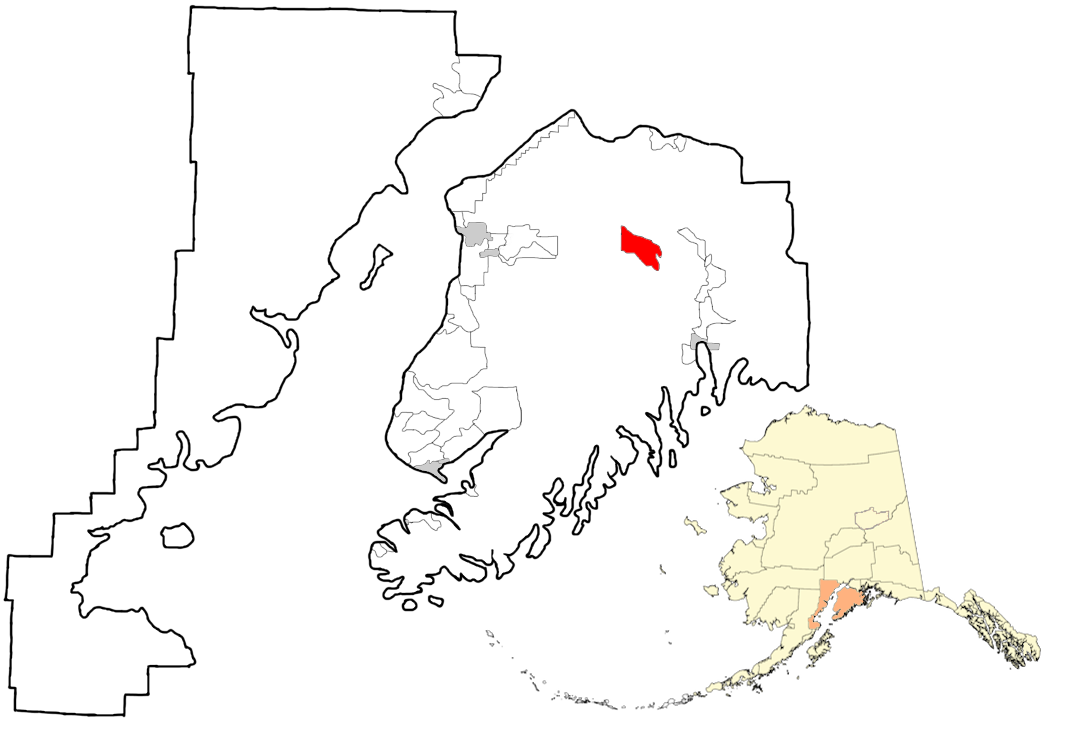
- Location in Kenai Peninsula Borough, Alaska
- Coordinates: 60°29′26″N 149°47′40″W
- Country: United States
- State: Alaska
- Borough: Kenai Peninsula

Government
  - Borough mayor: Peter Micciche
  - State senator: Jesse Bjorkman (R)
  - State rep.: Ben Carpenter (R)

Area
  - Total: 69.83 sq mi (180.87 km^{2})
  - Land: 65.75 sq mi (170.29 km^{2})
  - Water: 4.08 sq mi (10.58 km^{2})
- Elevation: 404 ft (123 m)

Population (2020)
  - Total: 344
  - Density: 5.2/sq mi (2.02/km^{2})
- Time zone: UTC-9 (AKST)
  - Summer (DST): UTC-8 (AKDT)
- ZIP code: 99572
- Area code: 907
- FIPS code: 02-17190
- GNIS feature ID: 1421192

Cooper Landing is a census-designated place (CDP) in Kenai Peninsula Borough, Alaska, United States, about 100 miles (160 km) south of Anchorage, at the outlet of Kenai Lake into the Kenai River. The town was first settled in the 19th century by gold and mineral prospectors, and has become a popular summer tourist destination thanks to its scenic location and proximity to the salmon fishery of the Kenai River and Russian River. As of the 2020 census, Cooper Landing had a population of 344.

== History ==
Cooper Landing was named for Joseph Cooper, a miner who discovered gold there in 1884. However, Peter Doroshin, a Russian engineer, had identified gold prospects as far back as 1848 when the territory was still part of Russian America.

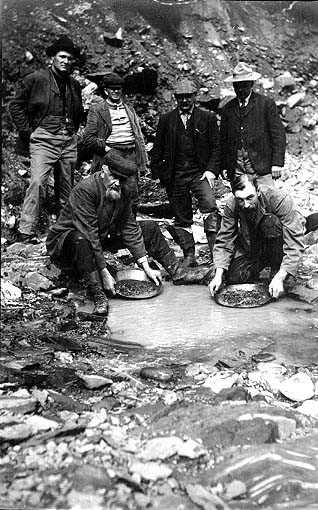
Panning for gold in Cooper Creek, 1907 photograph by John Nathan Cobb

Cooper Creek was first recorded in 1898 by the U.S. Geological Survey. In 1900, the Census found 21 miners and 1 wife living at Cooper Creek. The Riddiford Post Office began operations in 1924, and the Riddiford School opened in 1928.

In 1938, a road was constructed east to Seward. In 1948, a road west to Kenai was opened, and by 1951, residents could drive north to Anchorage. The Cooper Landing Community Club was first formed in 1949. The Cooper Lake Hydroelectric Facility was constructed in 1959-60.

In 1946, Pat and Helen Gwin arrived in Cooper Landing which had about 100 residents then. The Gwins eked out a living by operating a small packaged goods store out of a tent. That same year, construction began on the highway from Cooper Landing to Homer. The Sterling Highway, the road that is the artery of the Kenai Peninsula, opened in 1950, and subsequently the Seward Highway opened in 1951. Gwin's Lodge was built from spruce logs harvested from the surrounding Chugach National Forest. Cutting, hauling and hand-peeling the logs, Pat and Helen Gwin completed and opened the lodge on January 1, 1952. Pat and Helen parted ways in 1959, but Helen stayed to run the lodge and retired in 1976. The historic Gwin's Lodge is one of the oldest log roadhouses in Alaska and is still in operation today.

The Cooper Landing Post Office is the oldest building in the area that is still used and is listed on the National Register of Historic Places.

== Geography ==
Cooper Landing is located in the north-central part of the Kenai Peninsula at 60°29′26″N 149°47′40″W (60.490529, -149.794519). The center of the community is at the west end of Kenai Lake, where the lake flows into the Kenai River. The CDP extends east up Kenai Lake beyond the mouth of Quartz Creek from the north. To the south the CDP reaches Cooper Lake, and Cooper Creek, the lake's outlet, forms a portion of the CDP's southern border. The CDP reaches west down the Kenai River as far as the mouth of the Russian River, and to the north the CDP extends up the valley of Juneau Creek as far as Trout Lake. Elevations in the CDP range from approximately 330 feet (100 m) above sea level at the mouth of the Russian River, to 436 feet (133 m) at Kenai Lake, to 4,576 feet (1,395 m) at the summit of Cecil Rhode Mountain between Kenai Lake and Cooper Creek.

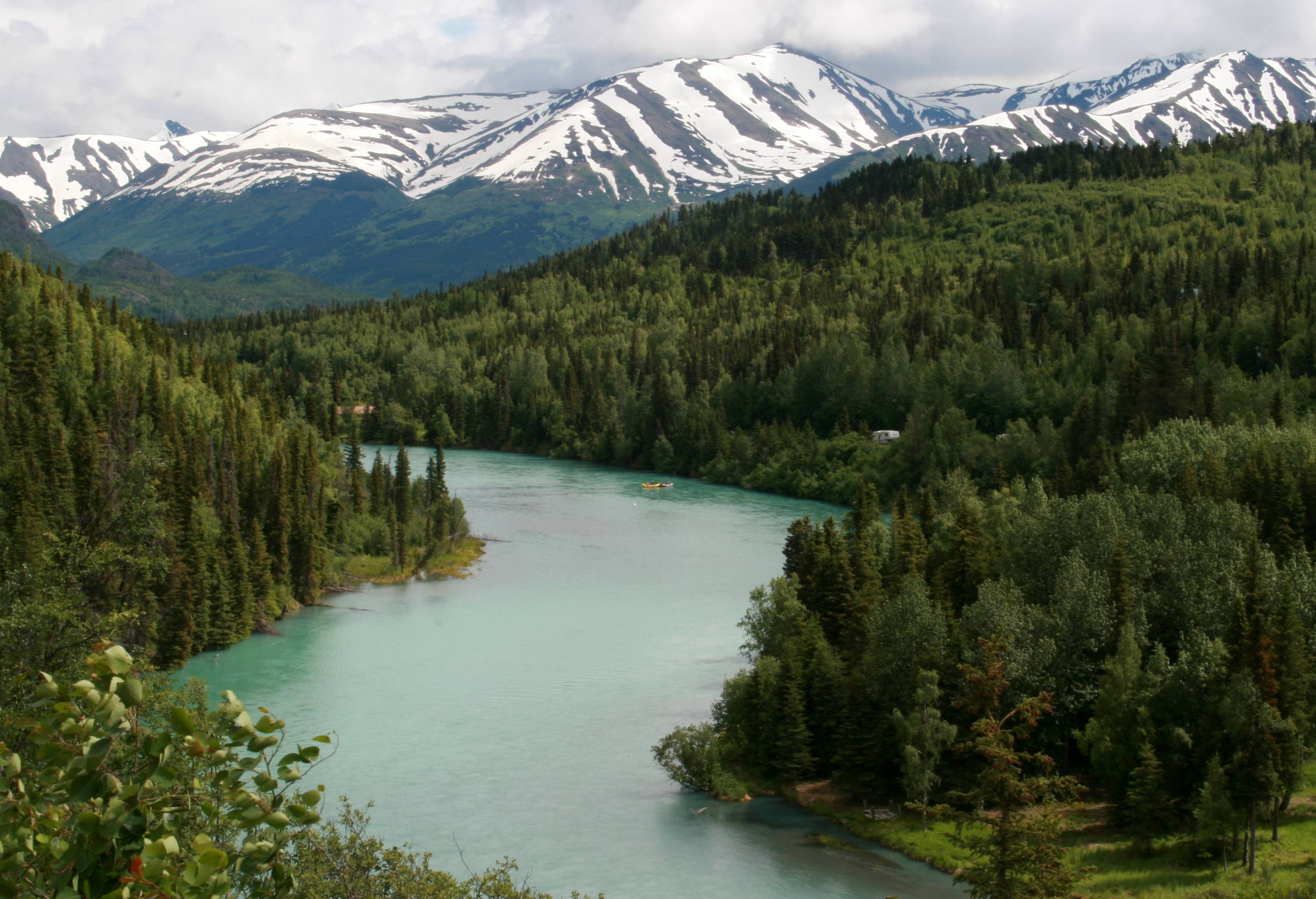
Kenai River at Cooper Landing

Alaska Route 1, the Sterling Highway, passes through the community, leading north 102 miles (164 km) to Anchorage and southwest 120 miles (190 km) to Homer. Soldotna, the Kenai Peninsula Borough seat, is 45 miles (72 km) to the west on AK-1, and Seward is 47 miles (76 km) to the southeast via routes 1 and 9.

According to the United States Census Bureau, the Cooper Landing CDP has a total area of 69.8 square miles (180.9 km^{2}), of which 65.8 square miles (170.3 km^{2}) are land, and 4.1 square miles (10.6 km^{2}), or 5.85%, are water.

== Climate ==
Cooper Landing has a subarctic climate (Köppen Dfc).

Climate data for Cooper Landing
Month	Jan	Feb	Mar	Apr	May	Jun	Jul	Aug	Sep	Oct	Nov	Dec	Year
Record high °F (°C)	58 (14)	59 (15)	51 (11)	64 (18)	73 (23)	78 (26)	80 (27)	81 (27)	71 (22)	64 (18)	55 (13)	52 (11)	81 (27)
Mean daily maximum °F (°C)	35 (2)	36.9 (2.7)	38.9 (3.8)	45.6 (7.6)	52.5 (11.4)	58.3 (14.6)	61.2 (16.2)	61.3 (16.3)	55.3 (12.9)	46.7 (8.2)	39 (4)	36.5 (2.5)	47.3 (8.5)
Mean daily minimum °F (°C)	25 (−4)	26.8 (−2.9)	27.8 (−2.3)	33.6 (0.9)	39.8 (4.3)	46.2 (7.9)	50.2 (10.1)	49.8 (9.9)	44.3 (6.8)	36.5 (2.5)	30 (−1)	26.8 (−2.9)	36.4 (2.4)
Record low °F (°C)	−4 (−20)	−2 (−19)	−13 (−25)	3 (−16)	23 (−5)	34 (1)	35 (2)	35 (2)	28 (−2)	16 (−9)	4 (−16)	−23 (−31)	−23 (−31)
Average precipitation inches (mm)	12.99 (330)	11.64 (296)	10.08 (256)	9.95 (253)	11.13 (283)	6.69 (170)	9.25 (235)	13.41 (341)	22.09 (561)	20.97 (533)	14.65 (372)	16.72 (425)	159.57 (4,053)
Average snowfall inches (cm)	24.2 (61)	21.7 (55)	21.7 (55)	5.9 (15)	0.1 (0.25)	0 (0)	0 (0)	0.2 (0.51)	0 (0)	1.8 (4.6)	10.4 (26)	25.3 (64)	111.3 (283)
Average precipitation days	16	15	15	15	17	15	17	17	21	21	18	19	206

== Demographics ==
Historical population
Census	Pop.	Note	%±
1950	60		—
1960	88		46.7%
1970	31		−64.8%
1980	116		274.2%
1990	243		109.5%
2000	369		51.9%
2010	289		−21.7%
2020	344		19.0%
U.S. Decennial Census

Cooper Landing first appeared on the 1950 U.S. Census as an unincorporated village. It was made a census-designated place (CDP) in 1980.

As of the census of 2000, there were 369 people, 162 households, and 96 families residing in the CDP. The population density was 5.6 inhabitants per square mile (2.2/km^{2}). There were 379 housing units at an average density of 5.7 per square mile (2.2/km^{2}). The racial makeup of the CDP was 91.60% White, 0.27% Black or African American, 2.98% Native American, 1.63% Asian, 0.27% from other races, and 3.25% from two or more races. 1.08% of the population were Hispanic or Latino of any race.

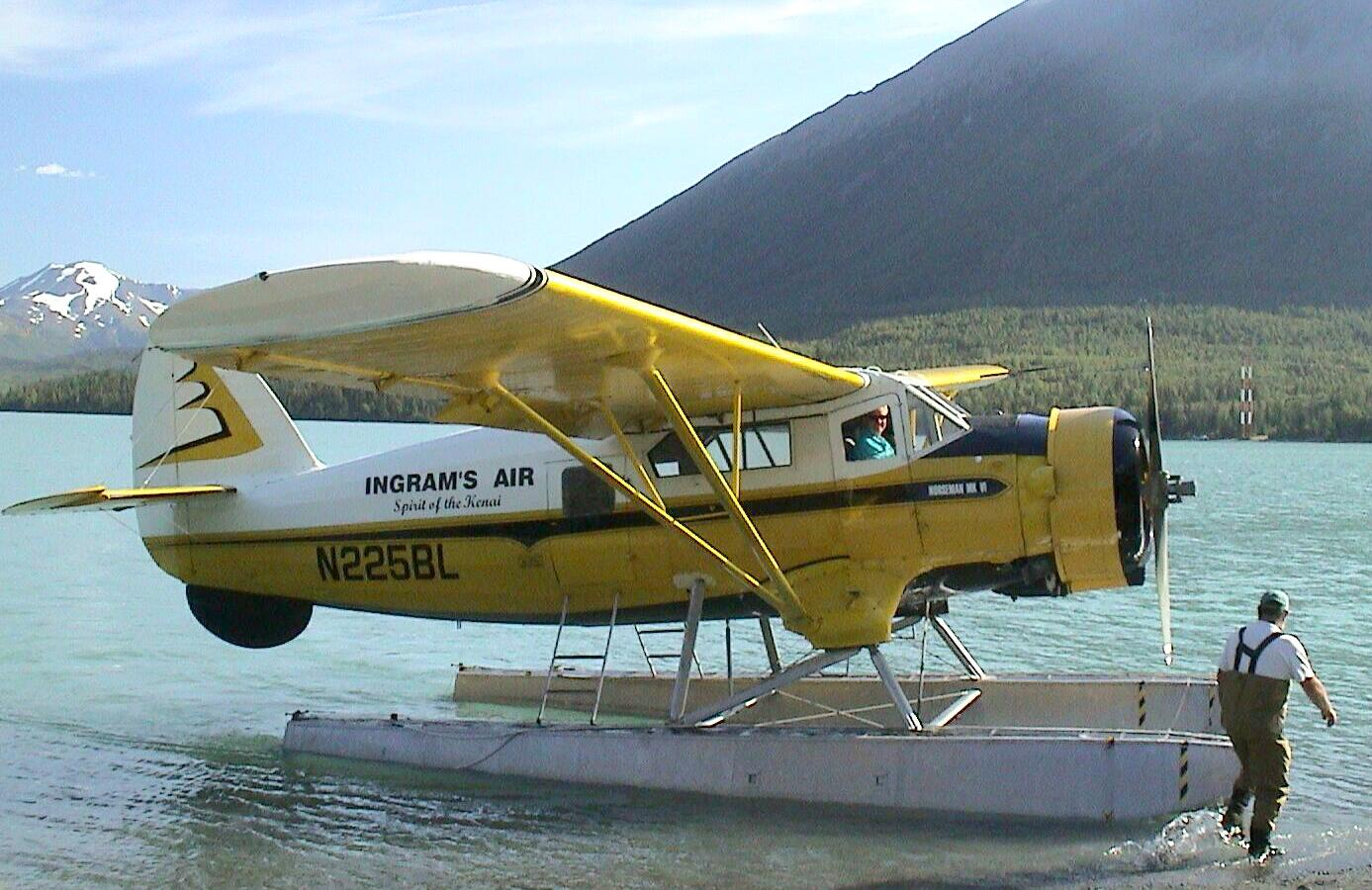
The "Spirit of the Kenai" operates as a charter out of Cooper Landing.

There were 162 households, out of which 21.6% had children under the age of 18 living with them, 50.6% were married couples living together, 4.3% had a female householder with no husband present, and 40.7% were non-families. 34.0% of all households were made up of individuals, and 9.9% had someone living alone who was 65 years of age or older. The average household size was 2.14 and the average family size was 2.74.

In the CDP, the population was spread out, with 18.2% under the age of 18, 7.0% from 18 to 24, 23.8% from 25 to 44, 32.2% from 45 to 64, and 18.7% who were 65 years of age or older. The median age was 46 years. For every 100 females, there were 117.1 males. For every 100 females age 18 and over, there were 120.4 males.

The median income for a household in the CDP was $34,844, and the median income for a family was $51,250. Males had a median income of $46,319 versus $34,276 for females. The per capita income for the CDP was $24,795. None of the families and 2.2% of the population were living below the poverty line, including no under eighteens and none of those over 64.
