= List of lakes named Summit Lake in British Columbia =

Summit Lake in British Columbia may refer to:

- In Alberni Land District:
  - Summit Lake 49°15′00″N 124°40′59″W
- In Cariboo Land District:
  - Summit Lake 52°19′00″N 123°34′00″W
  - Summit Lake (Crooked River)
  - Summit Lake 52°37′00″N 120°16′00″W
- In Cassiar Land District:
  - Summit Lake 59°39′45″N 135°06′47″W
  - Summit Lake 57°49′00″N 129°49′59″W
  - Summit Lake 56°13′00″N 130°04′59″W
  - Summit Lake 58°01′00″N 131°13′00″W
- In Kootenay Land District:
  - Summit Lake 50°09′00″N 117°37′59″W
  - Summit Lake 51°01′00″N 116°48′00″W
  - Summit Lake 51°27′00″N 116°16′59″W
  - Summit Lake 49°37′59″N 114°41′59″W
- In Lillooet Land District:
  - Summit Lake 51°07′59″N 123°28′59″W
- In Peace River Land District:
  - Summit Lake 58°38′59″N 124°40′00″W
- In Range 5 Coast Land District:
  - Summit Lake 54°28′00″N 126°38′59″W
- In Yale Land District
  - Summit Lake (Similkameen Division) 49°46′00″N 119°09′00″W
  - Summit Lake (Yale Division) 49°45′15″N 120°38′20″W
- Queen Charlotte Land District
  - Summit Lakes 52°40′59″N 131°52′59″W

== See also ==
- Summit Lake (disambiguation)
- Upper Summit Lake (British Columbia) (Cariboo Land District) 54°16′59″N 122°41′59″W
