= Summit Lake (Goudreau, Ontario) =

Lake in Algoma District, Ontario, Canada

- Location within Ontario
- Location: Goudreau, Unorganized North Part, Algoma District, Ontario
- Coordinates: 48°15′49″N 84°31′51″W
- Primary inflows: McVeigh Creek from Spring Lake
- Primary outflows: McVeigh Creek to Philip Lake
- Basin countries: Canada
- Max. length: 0.6 km (0.37 mi)
- Max. width: 0.16 km (0.099 mi)
- Surface elevation: 365 m (1,198 ft)

Summit Lake is a lake in the Michipicoten River system in the Lake Superior drainage basin located at Goudreau in the Unorganized North Part of Algoma District, Ontario, Canada. It is about 600 metres (1,969 ft) long and 160 metres (525 ft) wide, lies at an elevation of 365 metres (1,198 ft). The primary inflow is McVeigh Creek from Spring Lake, and the primary outflow is McVeigh Creek to Philip Lake, which flows via the Hawk River and Michipicoten River into Lake Superior. The Algoma Central Railway runs along the east shore of the lake.

A second Summit Lake in the Michipicoten River system, Summit Lake (Lochalsh River), lies 28 kilometres (17 mi) northeast.

== See also ==
- List of lakes in Ontario
