= Summit Lake (Rainy River District) =

Lake in Rainy River District, Ontario, Canada

- Location within Ontario
- Location: Rainy River District, Ontario
- Coordinates: 49°02′32″N 93°42′02″W
- Primary outflows: Unnamed creek, west to Kishkutena Lake
- Basin countries: Canada
- Max. length: 0.79 km (0.49 mi)
- Max. width: 0.36 km (0.22 mi)
- Surface elevation: 380 m (1,250 ft)

Summit Lake is a lake in Rainy River District, Ontario, Canada. It is about 790 metres (2,592 ft) long and 360 metres (1,181 ft) wide, and lies at an elevation of 380 metres (1,247 ft) about 18 kilometres (11 mi) southeast of the community of Nestor Falls. The lake is in the Nelson River system in the Hudson Bay drainage basin. There are no primary inflows, and the primary outflow, on the west side of the lake, is an unnamed creek west to Kishkutena Lake on the Sabaskong River, which flows into Lake of the Woods, and then via the Winnipeg River and Nelson River into Hudson Bay. The Height of Land portage runs from the north tip of the lake to Kishkutena Lake.
