= Summit Lake (Sudbury District) =

Lake in Sudbury District, Ontario, Canada

- lac Summit
- Location of Summit Lake in Ontario
- Location: Sudbury District, Ontario
- Coordinates: 48°25′35″N 82°43′15″W
- Primary inflows: Two unnamed creeks
- Primary outflows: Shiners Creek towards Shiners Lake
- Basin countries: Canada
- Max. length: 1.2 km (0.75 mi)
- Max. width: 0.5 km (0.31 mi)
- Surface elevation: 355 m (1,165 ft)

Summit Lake (French: lac Summit) is a lake in geographic Shenango Township in the Unorganized North Part of Sudbury District in Northeastern Ontario, Canada. It is in the James Bay drainage basin about 29 kilometres (18 mi) northwest of the community of Foleyet on Highway 101, and 4 kilometres (2.5 mi) northwest of Missonga and 6.7 kilometres (4.2 mi) southeast of Oatland railway points on the Canadian National Railway transcontinental main line (used at this point by the Via Rail Canadian service), which runs along the entire west side of the lake.

== Hydrology ==
Summit Lake is about 1.2 kilometres (0.7 mi) long and 0.5 kilometres (0.3 mi) wide, and lies at an elevation of 355 metres (1,165 ft). There are two unnamed creeks as inflows, located at the south and northeast tips of the lake. The primary outflow is Shiners Creek, towards Shiners Lake, at the northwest corner of the lake, which flows via the Nemegosenda River, Kapuskasing River, Mattagami River and Moose River into James Bay.
