= Wilson Township, Minnesota =

Wilson Township is the name of some places in the U.S. state of Minnesota:

- Wilson Township, Cass County, Minnesota
- Wilson Township, Winona County, Minnesota

See also

- Wilson Township (disambiguation)
