= Summit Lake (Lochalsh River) =

Lake in Algoma District, Ontario, Canada

- Location within Ontario
- Location: Goudreau, Unorganized North Part, Algoma District, Ontario
- Coordinates: 48°29′24″N 84°22′06″W
- Primary outflows: Lochalsh River to Philip Lake
- Basin countries: Canada
- Max. length: 0.63 km (0.39 mi)
- Max. width: 0.4 km (0.25 mi)
- Surface elevation: 377 m (1,237 ft)

Summit Lake is a lake in the Unorganized North Part of Algoma District, Ontario, Canada. It is about 630 metres (2,067 ft) long and 400 metres (1,312 ft) wide, lies at an elevation of 377 metres (1,237 ft). The lake is in the Michipicoten River system in the Lake Superior drainage basin, and is the source of the Lochalsh River. There are no primary inflows, and the primary outflow is the Lochalsh River, north towards St. Julien Lake, which flows into Dog Lake and then via the Michipicoten River into Lake Superior. The Algoma Central Railway runs along the east and shore, and the lake lies between Franz, on the line 4 kilometres (2.5 mi) southwest, and Scully, 5 kilometres (3.1 mi) north northeast.

A second Summit Lake in the Michipicoten River system, Summit Lake (Goudreau, Ontario), lies 28 kilometres (17 mi) southwest.

== See also ==
- List of lakes in Ontario
