= Summit Lake (Kandiyohi County, Minnesota) =

Lake in the state of Minnesota, United States

- Location within Minnesota
- Location: Kandiyohi County, Minnesota
- Coordinates: 45°7′33″N 94°49′16″W
- Type: lake

Summit Lake is a lake in Kandiyohi County, in the U.S. state of Minnesota.

Summit Lake was named for a nearby point of high elevation on the railroad.

== See also ==
- List of lakes in Minnesota
