= Trail Lakes =

Lake in Alaska, United States

Upper Trail Lake
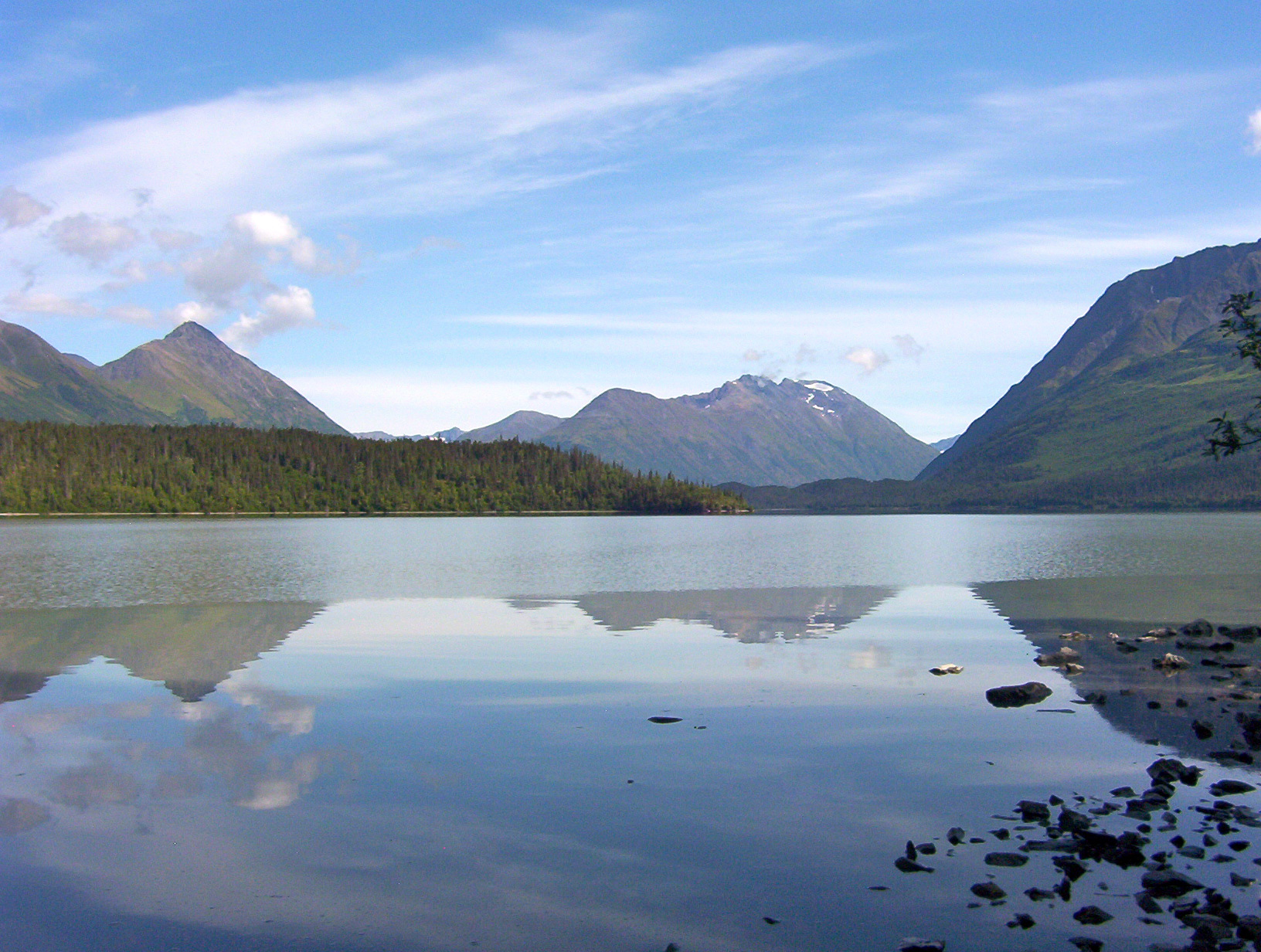
- Upper Trail Lake

- Location within Alaska Location within North America
- Location: Kenai Peninsula, Alaska
- Coordinates: 60°29′30″N 149°22′00″W
- Max. depth: 140 feet (43 m)

Lower Trail Lake
- Location within Alaska Location within North America
- Location: Kenai Peninsula, Alaska
- Coordinates: 60.442°N 149.365°W

The Trail Lakes are two lakes on the lower Kenai Peninsula, Alaska. The lakes are near the town of Moose Pass and adjacent to the Seward Highway. They are the home of a large salmon hatchery owned by the state of Alaska and operated by the Cook Inlet Aquaculture Association. The fish hatched at this facility are released into streams and lakes at various points on the peninsula, and are also the source of the salmon runs at the "fishing hole" on the Homer Spit. The hatchery was at the center of a prolonged legal battle between the Wilderness Society and the U.S. Fish and Wildlife Service. The society claimed that the hatchery was conducting commercial activity in a wilderness area, and such activity is illegal under the Wilderness Act.
