= Summit Lake (Vancouver Island) =

- Location within Vancouver Island
- Location: Vancouver Island, British Columbia
- Coordinates: 49°14′59″N 124°41′01″W
- Lake type: Natural lake
- Basin countries: Canada

Summit Lake is a small lake located on Vancouver Island, Canada, southwest of Cameron Lake.

== See also ==
- List of lakes of British Columbia
