= Summit Lake (Murray County, Minnesota) =

Lake in the state of Minnesota, United States

- Location within Minnesota
- Location: Murray County, Minnesota
- Coordinates: 43°59′50″N 95°51′30″W
- Type: lake

Summit Lake is a lake in Murray County, in the U.S. state of Minnesota.

Summit Lake was named for its lofty elevation.

== See also ==
- List of lakes in Minnesota
