= Summit Lake (Frontenac County) =

Lake in Frontenac County, Ontario, Canada

- Location within Ontario
- Location: North Frontenac, Frontenac County, Ontario
- Coordinates: 45°02′47″N 76°50′33″W
- Primary inflows: Deadbeaver Creek
- Primary outflows: Unnamed creek to Palmerston Lake
- Basin countries: Canada
- Max. length: 1.2 km (0.75 mi)
- Max. width: 0.5 km (0.31 mi)
- Surface elevation: 280 m (920 ft)

Summit Lake is a lake in the Madawaska Highlands in North Frontenac, Frontenac County, Ontario, Canada, about 3.5 kilometres (2.2 mi) northwest of the community of Ompah.

== Hydrology ==
Summit Lake is about 1,200 metres (3,937 ft) long and 500 metres (1,640 ft) wide, and lies at an elevation of 280 metres (919 ft). The inflows are Deadbeaver Creek from the south, and an unnamed creek from the north. The primary outflow is an unnamed creek, towards Palmerston Lake, at the east end of the lake, which is controlled by a dam. The waters eventually flow via Conns Creek, the Mississippi River and the Ottawa River into the St. Lawrence River.

== See also ==
- List of lakes in Ontario
