= Lake Grouse =

Body of water in Alaska, USA

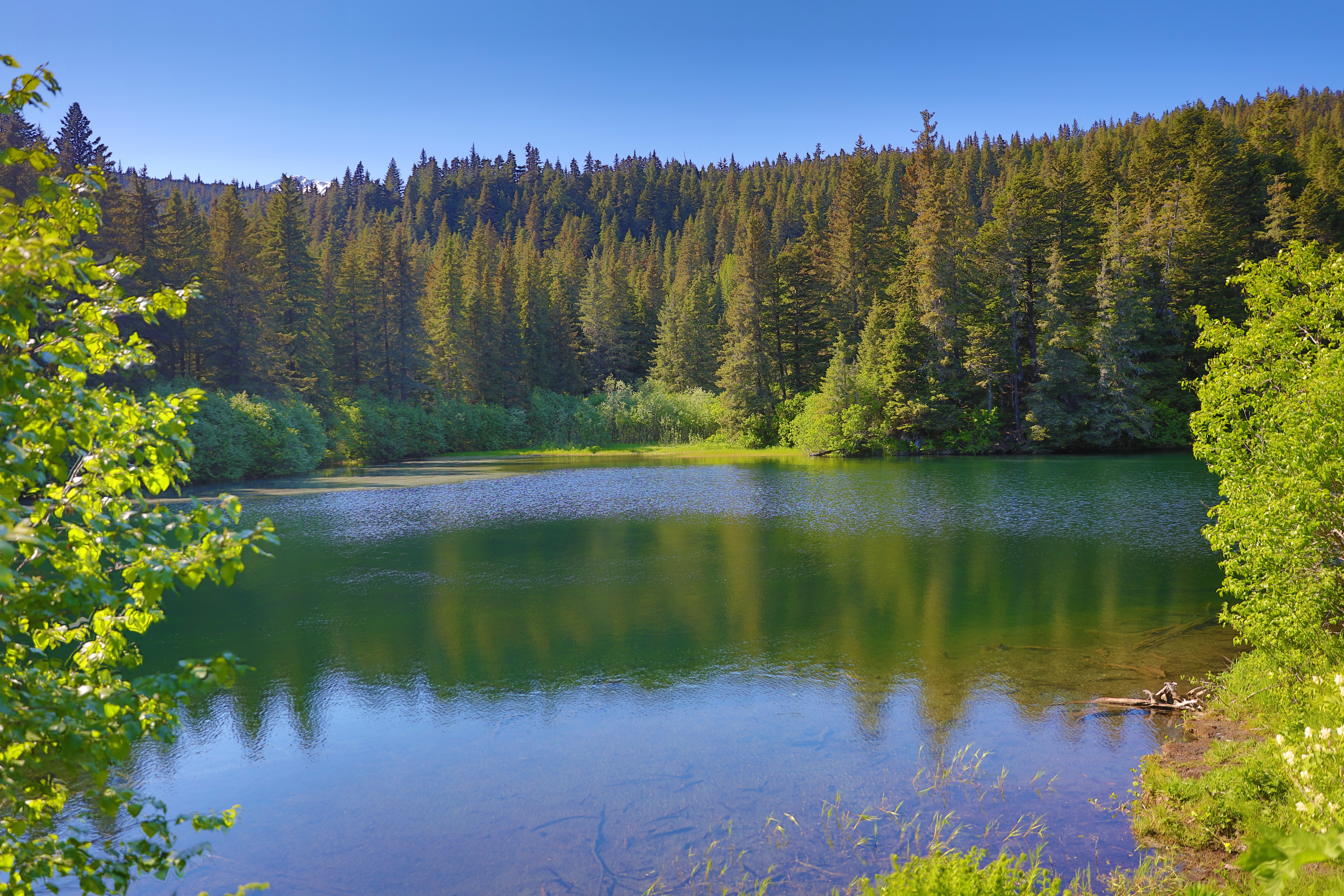
- The lake in June 2019

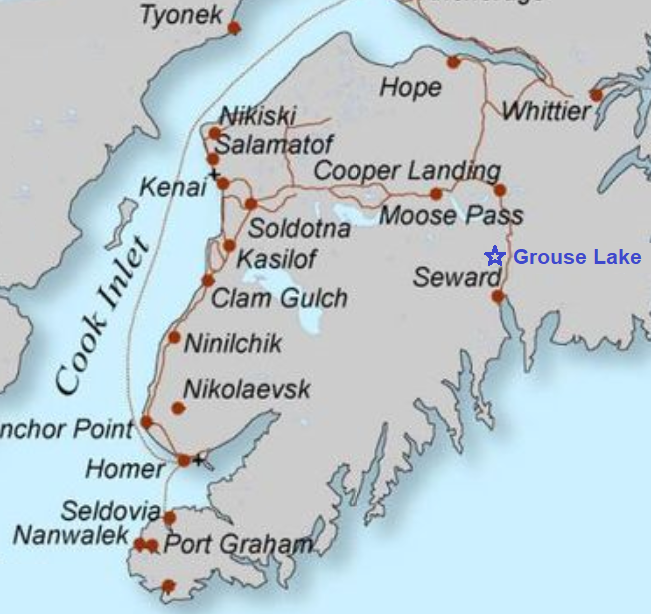
- The lake in the Kenai Peninsula
- Location: Alaska, United States of America
- Coordinates: 60°12′04″N 149°22′30″W
- Primary inflows: minor tributary
- Primary outflows: minor tributary (tributary of Lost Creek)
- Max. length: 0.62 km (0.39 mi)
- Max. width: 0.14 km (0.087 mi)
- Surface elevation: 95 m (312 ft)

Lake Grouse (or Grouse Lake) is a small lake of glacial origin located on the Kenai Peninsula in the U.S. state of Alaska, approximately 10 km (6.2 mi) north of Seward. The name first appeared in a 1906 United States Geological Survey record reported (from a local name) by cartographer Moffit.

Salvelinus malma (Dolly Varden) trout can be fished in this lake. Ice fishing is possible from December to April.
