= Summit Lake (Kenora District) =

Lake in Kenora District, Ontario, Canada

- Location within Ontario
- Location: Kenora District, Ontario
- Coordinates: 49°28′59″N 92°39′16″W
- Primary outflows: Unnamed creek, south towards Mud Lake
- Basin countries: Canada
- Max. length: 2.6 km (1.6 mi)
- Max. width: 0.8 km (0.50 mi)
- Surface elevation: 391 m (1,283 ft)

Summit Lake is a lake in Kenora District, Ontario, Canada. It is about 2.6 kilometres (1.6 mi) long and 0.8 kilometres (0.5 mi) wide, and lies at an elevation of 391 metres (1,283 ft). The lake is in the Nelson River system in the Hudson Bay drainage basin. There are no primary inflows, and the primary outflow is an unnamed creek, south towards Mud Lake, which flows into Upper Manitou Lake, and then via the Manitou River, Seine River, Rainy River, Winnipeg River and Nelson River into Hudson Bay. Highway 502 runs on the east side of the lake.

== See also ==
- List of lakes in Ontario
