= Moose Pass, Alaska =

- Census-designated place
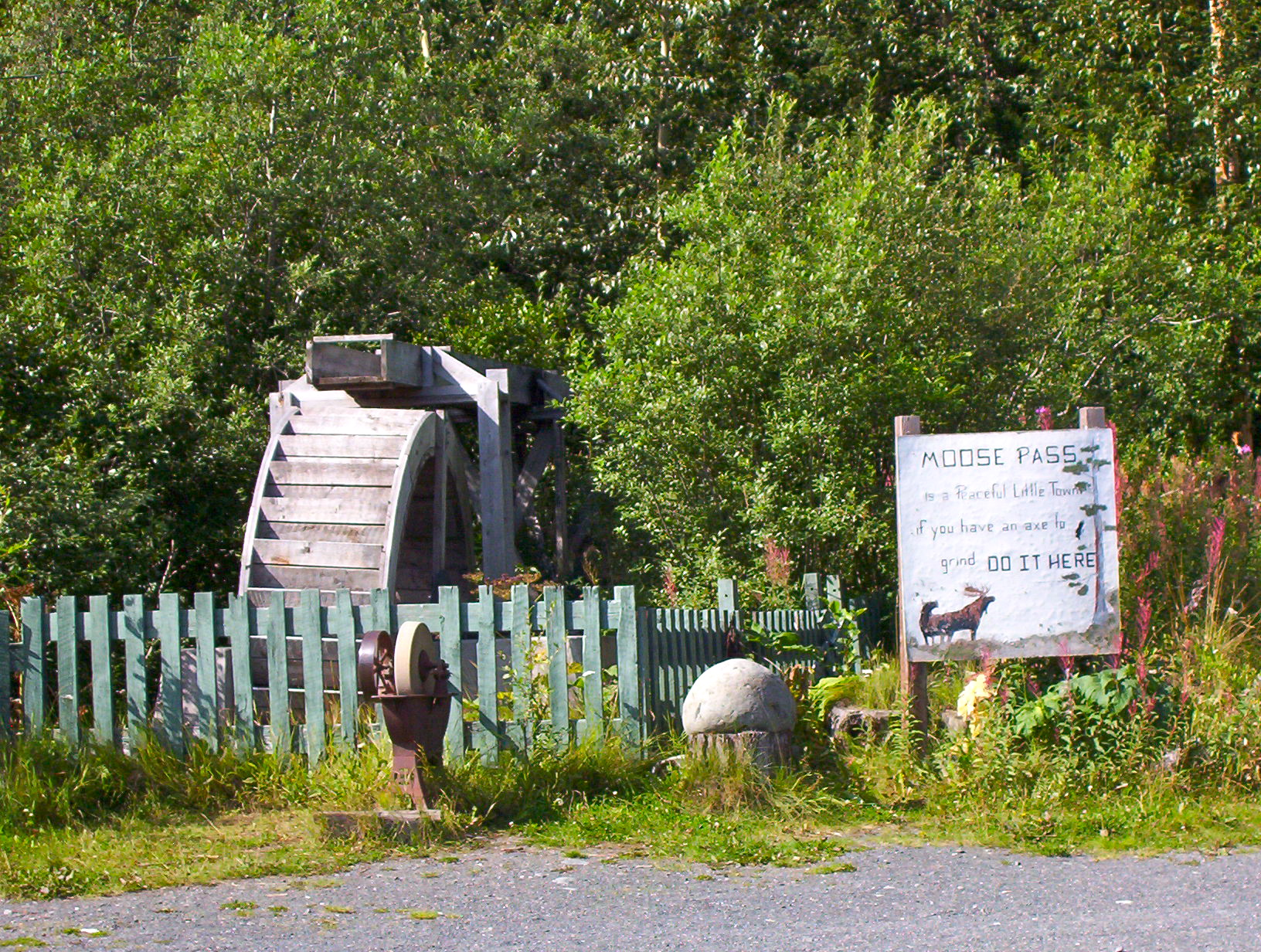
- Water wheel and grindstone by side of Seward Highway. The sign reads: "Moose Pass is a peaceful little town, if you have an axe to grind, do it here."

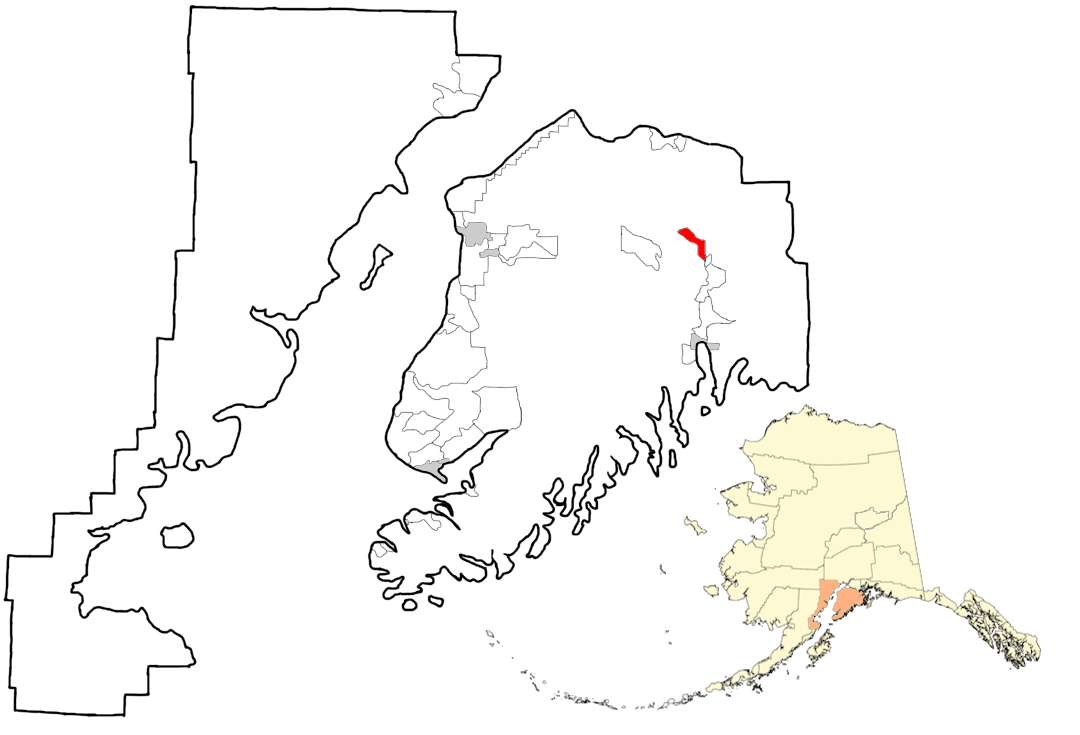
- Location in Kenai Peninsula Borough, Alaska
- Coordinates: 60°29′16″N 149°22′15″W
- Country: United States
- State: Alaska
- Borough: Kenai Peninsula

Government
  - Borough mayor: Peter Micciche
  - State senator: Jesse Bjorkman (R)
  - State rep.: Ben Carpenter (R)

Area
  - Total: 17.88 sq mi (46.31 km^{2})
  - Land: 17.71 sq mi (45.88 km^{2})
  - Water: 0.17 sq mi (0.43 km^{2})
- Elevation: 472 ft (144 m)

Population (2020)
  - Total: 228
  - Density: 12.9/sq mi (4.97/km^{2})
- Time zone: UTC-9 (Alaska (AKST))
  - Summer (DST): UTC-8 (AKDT)
- ZIP code: 99631
- Area code: 907
- FIPS code: 02-50190
- GNIS feature ID: 1417076

Moose Pass is a census-designated place (CDP) in Kenai Peninsula Borough, Alaska, United States. As of the 2020 census, Moose Pass had a population of 228.

== Geography ==
Moose Pass is located in the north-central part of the Kenai Peninsula at 60°29′16″N 149°22′15″W (60.487778, -149.370833). Surrounded by the Chugach National Forest, it is located 100 miles (160 km) south of Anchorage by road, and 30 miles (48 km) north of Seward on the Seward Highway along Upper Trail Lake. It is bordered to the south by Crown Point.

The CDP extends west 8 miles (13 km) along the Seward Highway to its junction with Alaska Route 1 (the Sterling Highway) at Tern Lake, from which point it is a further 56 miles (90 km) west to Soldotna, the borough seat.

According to the United States Census Bureau, the Moose Pass CDP has a total area of 17.9 square miles (46.3 km^{2}), of which 17.7 square miles (45.9 km^{2}) are land and 0.2 square miles (0.4 km^{2}), or 0.94%, are water.

=== Climate ===
Moose Pass has a dry-summer continental subarctic climate (Köppen Dsc).

Climate data for Moose Pass, Alaska (1991–2020 normals, (Note: Mean monthly maxima and minima (i.e. the highest and lowest temperature readings during an entire month or year) calculated based on data at said location from 1991 to 2020.) extremes 1941–present)
| Month | Jan | Feb | Mar | Apr | May | Jun | Jul | Aug | Sep | Oct | Nov | Dec | Year |
|---|---|---|---|---|---|---|---|---|---|---|---|---|---|
| Record high °F (°C) | 58 (14) | 50 (10) | 59 (15) | 65 (18) | 80 (27) | 90 (32) | 89 (32) | 86 (30) | 73 (23) | 60 (16) | 53 (12) | 50 (10) | 90 (32) |
| Mean maximum °F (°C) | 42.7 (5.9) | 42.0 (5.6) | 46.9 (8.3) | 57.7 (14.3) | 70.8 (21.6) | 80.2 (26.8) | 82.1 (27.8) | 77.8 (25.4) | 65.7 (18.7) | 54.0 (12.2) | 44.5 (6.9) | 42.1 (5.6) | 83.6 (28.7) |
| Mean daily maximum °F (°C) | 23.7 (−4.6) | 28.8 (−1.8) | 34.5 (1.4) | 44.8 (7.1) | 55.1 (12.8) | 63.3 (17.4) | 65.6 (18.7) | 63.7 (17.6) | 54.8 (12.7) | 41.6 (5.3) | 30.1 (−1.1) | 26.9 (−2.8) | 44.4 (6.9) |
| Daily mean °F (°C) | 16.2 (−8.8) | 20.9 (−6.2) | 24.4 (−4.2) | 35.7 (2.1) | 44.6 (7.0) | 52.6 (11.4) | 56.2 (13.4) | 54.2 (12.3) | 46.2 (7.9) | 34.5 (1.4) | 23.7 (−4.6) | 19.5 (−6.9) | 35.7 (2.1) |
| Mean daily minimum °F (°C) | 8.7 (−12.9) | 12.9 (−10.6) | 14.2 (−9.9) | 26.5 (−3.1) | 34.0 (1.1) | 42.0 (5.6) | 46.8 (8.2) | 44.8 (7.1) | 37.7 (3.2) | 27.4 (−2.6) | 17.4 (−8.1) | 12.1 (−11.1) | 27.0 (−2.8) |
| Mean minimum °F (°C) | −15.9 (−26.6) | −10.4 (−23.6) | −8.7 (−22.6) | 11.6 (−11.3) | 26.1 (−3.3) | 32.8 (0.4) | 39.0 (3.9) | 34.5 (1.4) | 25.1 (−3.8) | 11.7 (−11.3) | −3.9 (−19.9) | −11.7 (−24.3) | −22.7 (−30.4) |
| Record low °F (°C) | −43 (−42) | −48 (−44) | −30 (−34) | −17 (−27) | 15 (−9) | 24 (−4) | 29 (−2) | 27 (−3) | 13 (−11) | −10 (−23) | −21 (−29) | −37 (−38) | −48 (−44) |
| Average precipitation inches (mm) | 3.46 (88) | 5.25 (133) | 2.16 (55) | 2.27 (58) | 2.10 (53) | 1.74 (44) | 2.43 (62) | 3.76 (96) | 6.04 (153) | 5.41 (137) | 4.23 (107) | 3.35 (85) | 42.20 (1,072) |
| Average snowfall inches (cm) | 13.9 (35) | 10.7 (27) | 12.2 (31) | 3.2 (8.1) | 0.0 (0.0) | 0.0 (0.0) | 0.0 (0.0) | 0.0 (0.0) | trace | 3.5 (8.9) | 13.6 (35) | 20.7 (53) | 77.8 (198) |
| Average precipitation days (≥ 0.01 in) | 10.6 | 8.6 | 8.2 | 7.2 | 6.8 | 6.0 | 7.4 | 10.6 | 11.6 | 11.4 | 10.0 | 11.4 | 109.8 |
| Average snowy days (≥ 0.1 in) | 6.8 | 4.7 | 4.0 | 1.6 | 0.0 | 0.0 | 0.0 | 0.0 | 0.0 | 1.6 | 4.8 | 7.1 | 30.6 |
Source 1: NOAA (precip days, snow/snow days 1981–2010)
Source 2: National Weather Service

== Demographics ==
Historical population
| Census | Pop. | Note | %± |
|---|---|---|---|
| 1940 | 84 | | — |
| 1950 | 70 | | −16.7% |
| 1960 | 136 | | 94.3% |
| 1970 | 53 | | −61.0% |
| 1980 | 76 | | 43.4% |
| 1990 | 81 | | 6.6% |
| 2000 | 206 | | 154.3% |
| 2010 | 219 | | 6.3% |
| 2020 | 228 | | 4.1% |
U.S. Decennial Census

Moose Pass first reported on the 1940 U.S. Census as an unincorporated village. It was made a census-designated place (CDP) in 1980.

As of the census of 2000, there were 206 people, 84 households, and 51 families residing in the CDP. The population density was 11.4 inhabitants per square mile (4.4/km^{2}). There were 119 housing units at an average density of 6.6 per square mile (2.5/km^{2}). The racial makeup of the CDP was 87.38% White, 1.46% Black or African American, 5.83% Native American, and 5.34% from two or more races. Hispanic or Latino of any race were 0.49% of the population.

There were 84 households, out of which 32.1% had children under the age of 18 living with them, 53.6% were married couples living together, 4.8% had a female householder with no husband present, and 38.1% were non-families. 31.0% of all households were made up of individuals, and 4.8% had someone living alone who was 65 years of age or older. The average household size was 2.45 and the average family size was 3.13.

In the CDP, the population was spread out, with 29.1% under the age of 18, 5.3% from 18 to 24, 35.0% from 25 to 44, 25.2% from 45 to 64, and 5.3% who were 65 years of age or older. The median age was 36 years. For every 100 females there were 151.2 males. For every 100 females age 18 and over, there were 139.3 males.

The median income for a household in the CDP was $87,291, and the median income for a family was $85,463. Males had a median income of $61,563 versus $31,563 for females. The per capita income for the CDP was $28,147. None of the families and none of the population were living below the poverty line.
