= Summit Lake (Willow, Alaska) =

Lake in the state of Alaska, United States

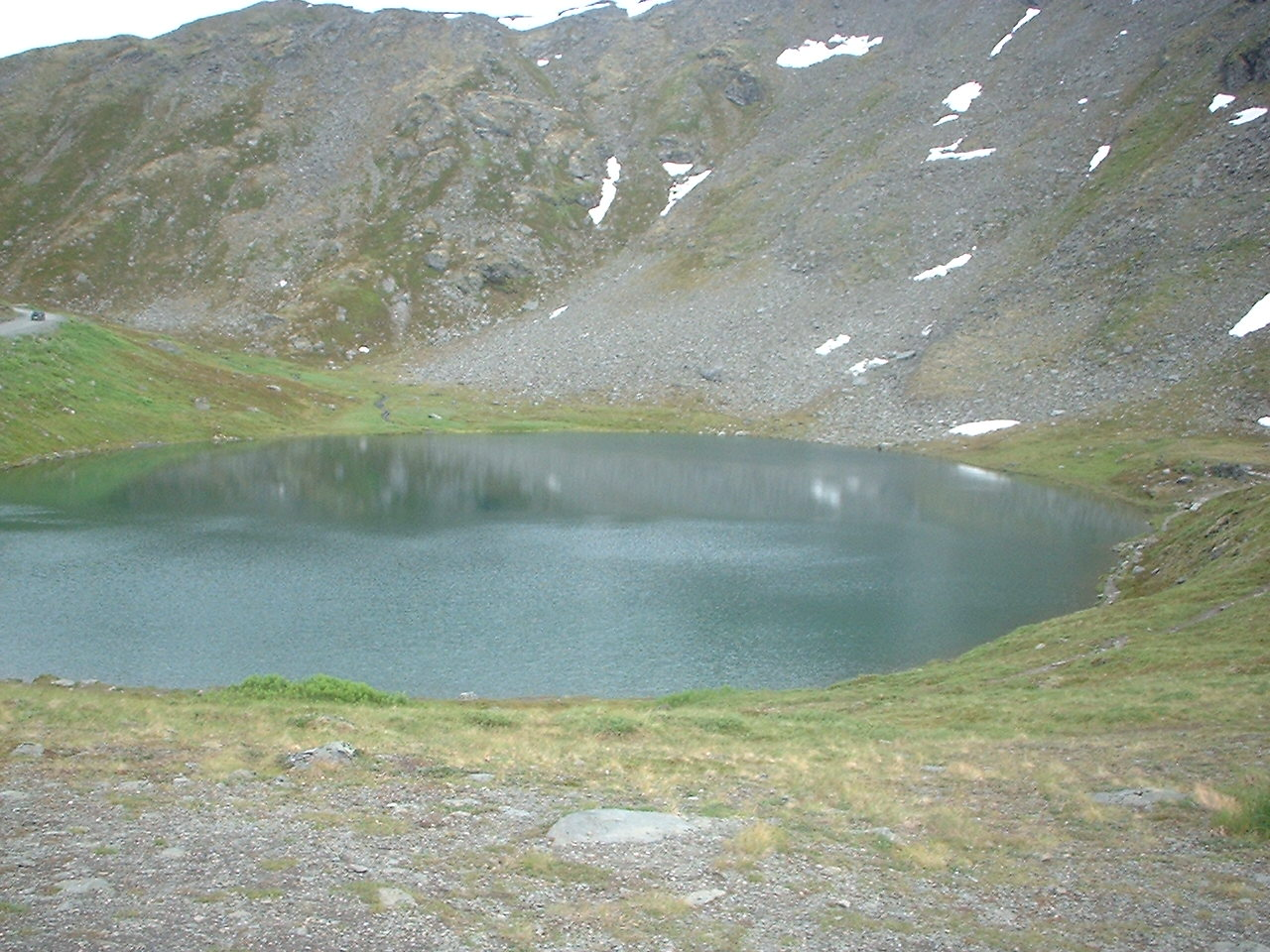
- A mid-summer view of Summit Lake

- Location of Summit Lake within the State of Alaska
- Location: Willow, Alaska; United States
- Coordinates: 61°45′58″N 149°19′16″W
- Type: Natural lake
- Part of: Susitna River Basin
- Primary inflows: Snow fields & springs
- Primary outflows: Willow Creek (Note: The Willow Creek (into which the Summit Lake drains) should not be confused with Willow Creek, Alaska, a census-designated place about 133 miles (214 km) east of Summit Lake.)
- Basin countries: United States
- Managing agency: Alaska Department of Natural Resources: Division of Parks and Outdoor Recreation
- Designation: State recreational site
- Max. depth: 20 feet (6.1 m)
- Surface elevation: 3,600 feet (1,100 m)

Summit Lake is a very small tarn (cirque lake) located above the tree line within the Hatcher Pass of the Talkeetna Mountains in Willow, Alaska, United States.

== Description ==
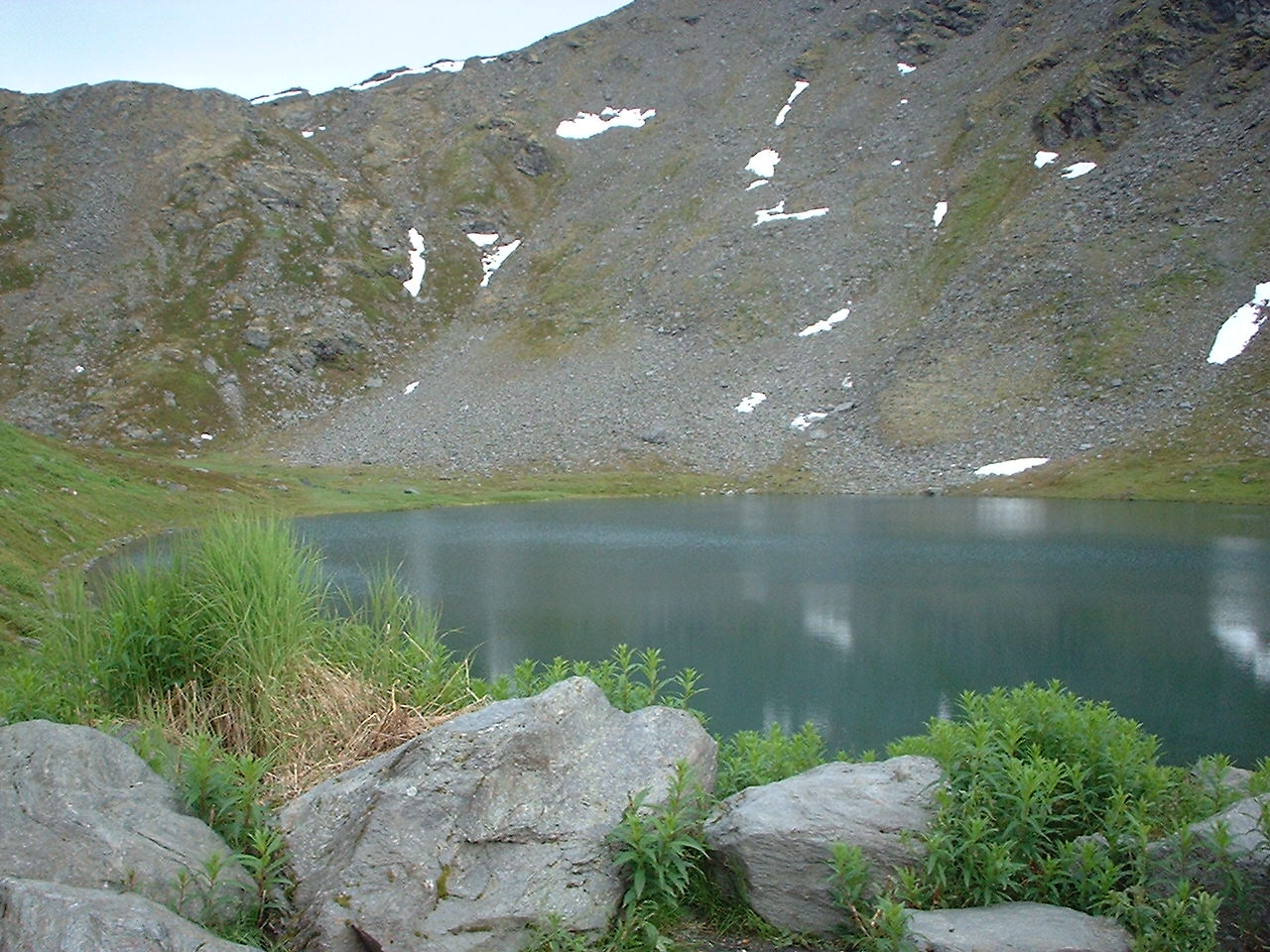
Another view of Summit Lake, with the rock glacier in the background

The lake is located about 2,000 feet (610 m) southwest of the summit of Hatcher Pass, about 2 miles (3.2 km) southwest of the Independence Mine State Historic Park, and about 2,500 feet (760 m) northwest of Hatch Peak. It is also about 26 miles (42 km) west of main area of Willow and about 12 miles (19 km) north of both Palmer and Wasilla. The lake is situated within (and is the namesake of) the Summit Lake Recreation Site The lake is fed directly by springs and snow fields and flows via a waterfall into beginning of Willow Creek. Willow Creek feeds into the Susitna River, which empties into the Cook Inlet of the Gulf of Alaska.

While the lake is very small, it is still a very popular site for photography. In addition to the lake's very scenic views in the summer, the area is also a destination for hiking and paragliding. In winter, the area is also popular for backcountry winter sports and access to the area is maintained year-round. However, complete access through the pass (including access from Willow) is usually not possible until early July. The lake itself is accessed from the gravel road by a wide, but short and fairly rocky trail.

== See also ==
- List of lakes of Alaska
