= Portage (disambiguation) =

Portage is the practice of carrying a canoe or other boat over land to avoid an obstacle on the water route.

Portage may also refer to:

== Places ==
=== United States ===
- Portage, Alaska
- Portage, Indiana
- Portage, Kansas
- Portage, Maine
- Portage, Michigan
- Portage (town), New York
- Portage, Ohio
- Portage, Pennsylvania
- Portage, Utah
- Portage, Wisconsin
- Portage County (disambiguation) (multiple)
- Portage Lake (disambiguation)
- Portage Lakes (Ohio), a group of lakes
- Portage Lakes, Ohio, a place there
- Portage Glacier, Alaska
- Portage River (Ohio) in northwest Ohio
- Portage Township (disambiguation) (multiple locations)

=== Canada ===
- Portage, Nova Scotia
- Portage, Prince Edward Island
- Portage la Prairie, Manitoba, Canada (often referred to as "Portage")
  - Portage—Lisgar, a federal electoral district covering the city of Portage la Prairie
- Portage Avenue, a street in Winnipeg, Manitoba
  - 201 Portage
  - Portage and Main
  - Portage Place
- Portage la Prairie (disambiguation)
- Place du Portage, an office complex in Gatineau, Quebec

=== Elsewhere ===
- Portage, New Zealand, a small settlement in Kenepuru Sound

== Other ==
- Portage (software), the package management system for Gentoo Linux
- A section of a cyclo-cross race course where a rider must dismount and carry their bicycle

== See also ==
- Portage County (disambiguation)
- Grand Portage (disambiguation)
