= Portage Lake =

Portage Lake may refer to:

== Communities in the United States ==
- Portage Lake, Maine
- Portage Lakes, Ohio

== Lakes in the United States ==
- Portage Lake (Alaska)
- Portage Lake (Maine)
- Portage Lake (Keweenaw), in the Keweenaw Peninsula of Michigan
- Portage Lake (Michigan), in Manistee County, Michigan
- Portage Lake (Aitkin County, Minnesota)
- Portage Lake (Hubbard County, Minnesota)
- Portage Lake (Otter Tail County, Minnesota)
- Portage Lake County Park, in Jackson County, Michigan
- Portage Lakes, a group of lakes in Ohio
- Lake Margrethe in Crawford County, Michigan, formerly known as Portage Lake
