= Maynard Mountain =

Mountain in Alaska, United States

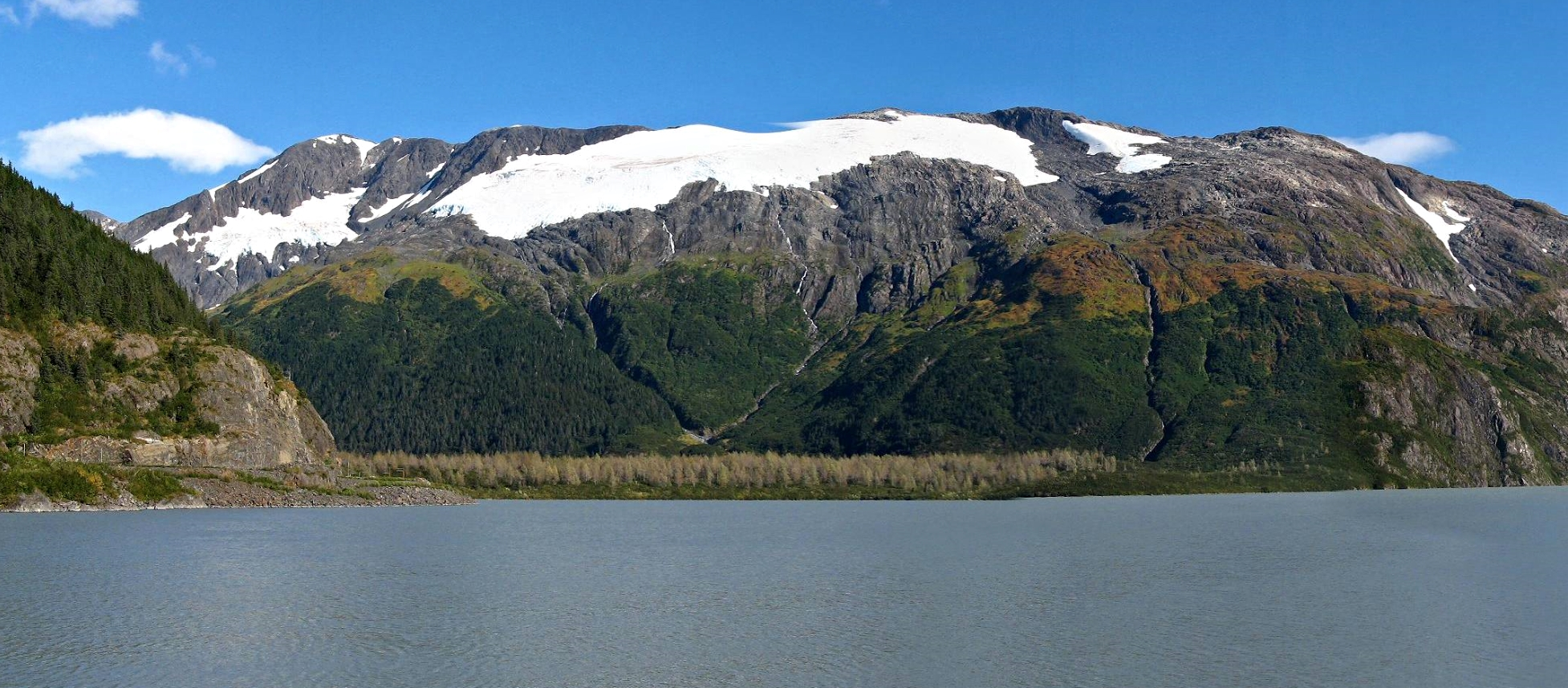
- Maynard Mountain seen from Portage Lake

Highest point
- Elevation: 4,137 ft (1,261 m)
- Prominence: 2,038 ft (621 m)
- Parent peak: Lowell Peak
- Isolation: 1.98 mi (3.19 km)
- Coordinates: 60°48′08″N 148°44′53″W

Geography
- Location within Alaska
- Interactive map of Maynard Mountain
- Location: Chugach National Forest; Anchorage Borough; Alaska, United States
- Parent range: Chugach Mountains
- Topo map: USGS Seward D-5

Climbing
- Easiest route: South ridge

Maynard Mountain is a 4,137-foot (1,261 m) mountain summit located in the Chugach Mountains, in the U.S. state of Alaska. The peak is situated in Chugach National Forest, 3 mi (5 km) northwest of Whittier, Alaska, at the isthmus of the Kenai Peninsula, where the Chugach Mountains meet the Kenai Mountains. Nearby peaks include Bard Peak, 4.14 mi (7 km) to the south, and Begich Peak, 3.1 mi (5 km) to the west-northwest. Although modest in elevation, relief is significant since the eastern aspect of the mountain rises up from the tidewater of Prince William Sound's Passage Canal in approximately one mile. Maynard Mountain is often seen and photographed in the background behind Portage Lake, a popular tourist and recreation destination. The Anton Anderson Memorial Tunnel, often called the Whittier Tunnel, is a dual-use highway and railroad tunnel that passes through Maynard Mountain. With a length of 13,300 feet (4,100 meters), it is the second-longest highway tunnel and longest combined rail and highway tunnel in North America.

== Etymology ==
The mountain was named by Chief Warrant Officer Robert G. Warns, US Army, in commemoration of his friend Robert L. Maynard, a fellow Army helicopter pilot who was killed April 27, 1964, when his CH-21 helicopter crashed on the nearby Portage Glacier while aiding victims of the Good Friday earthquake. The flight was in support of operation "Helping Hand", transporting personnel and supplies from Anchorage to the Port of Whittier. The mountain's toponym was officially adopted November 9, 1965, by the United States Geological Survey.

== Climate ==
Based on the Köppen climate classification, Maynard Mountain is located in a subarctic climate zone with long, cold, snowy winters, and mild summers. Weather systems coming off the Gulf of Alaska are forced upwards by the Chugach Mountains (orographic lift), causing heavy precipitation in the form of rainfall and snowfall. Temperatures can drop below −20 °C with wind chill factors below −30 °C. This climate supports permanent ice on the slopes of the mountain, as well as the Learnard Glacier on the northeast aspect. The months May through June offer the most favorable weather for climbing or viewing.

== Gallery ==
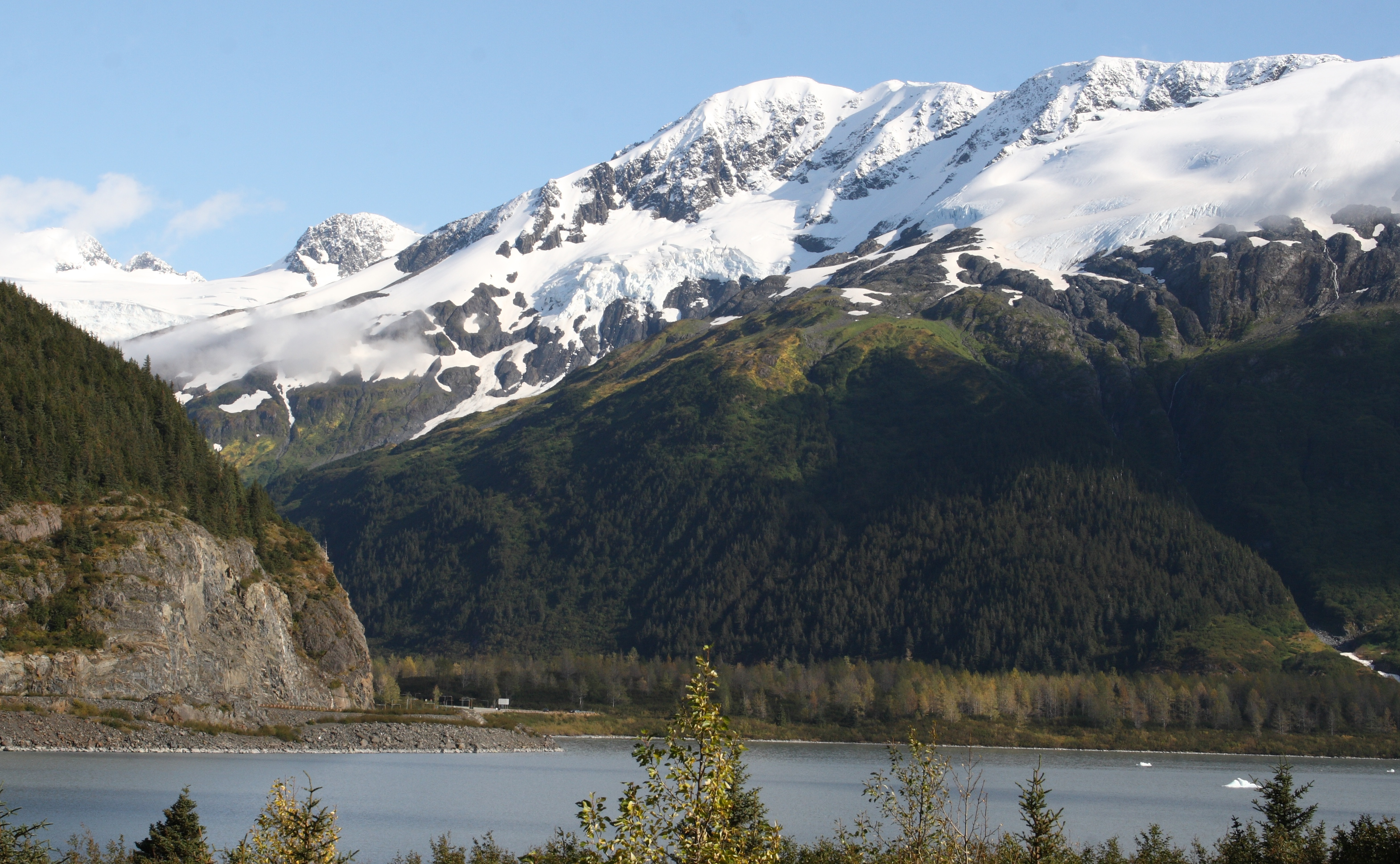
Maynard Mountain

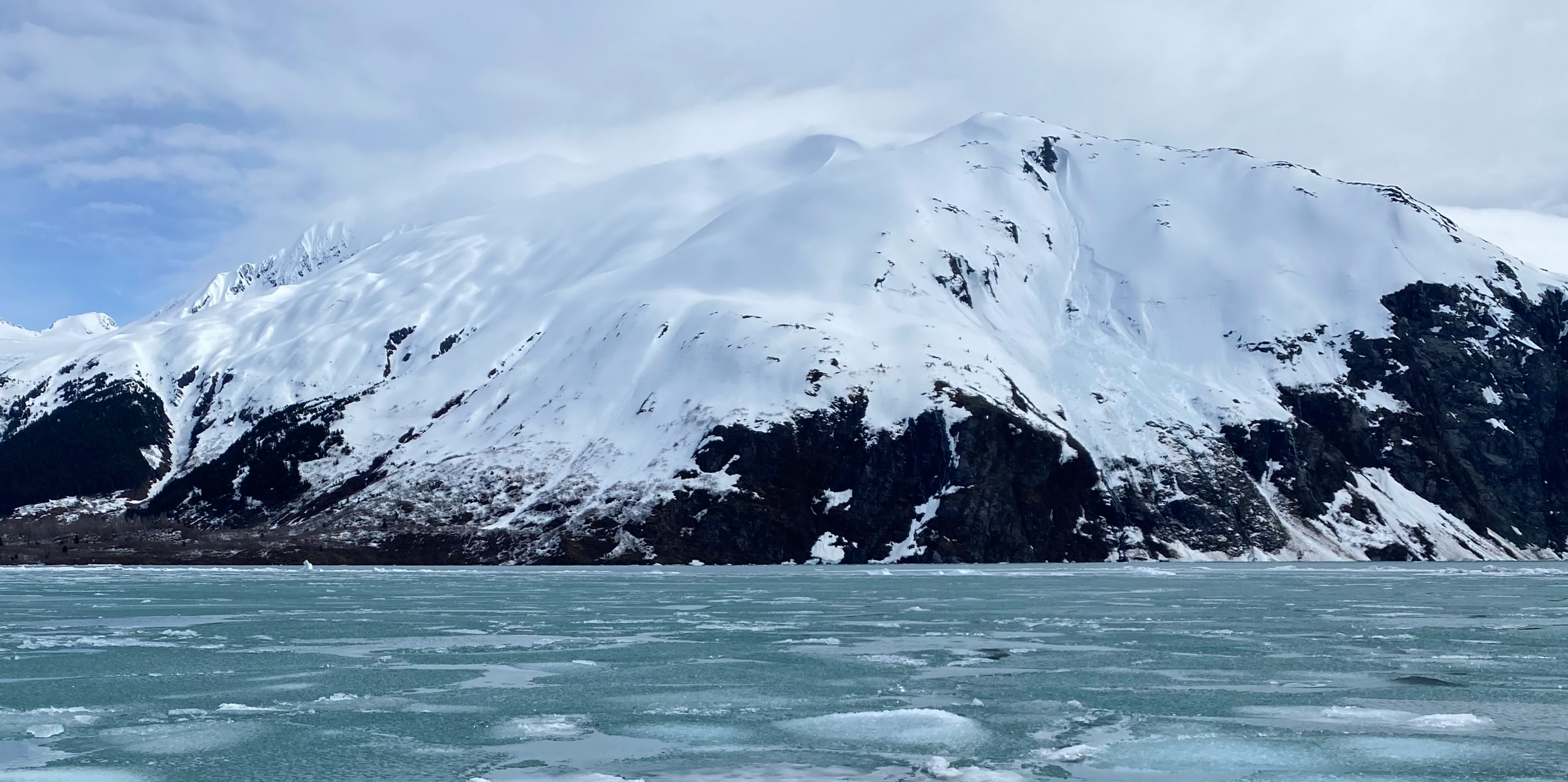
Maynard Mountain and Portage Lake

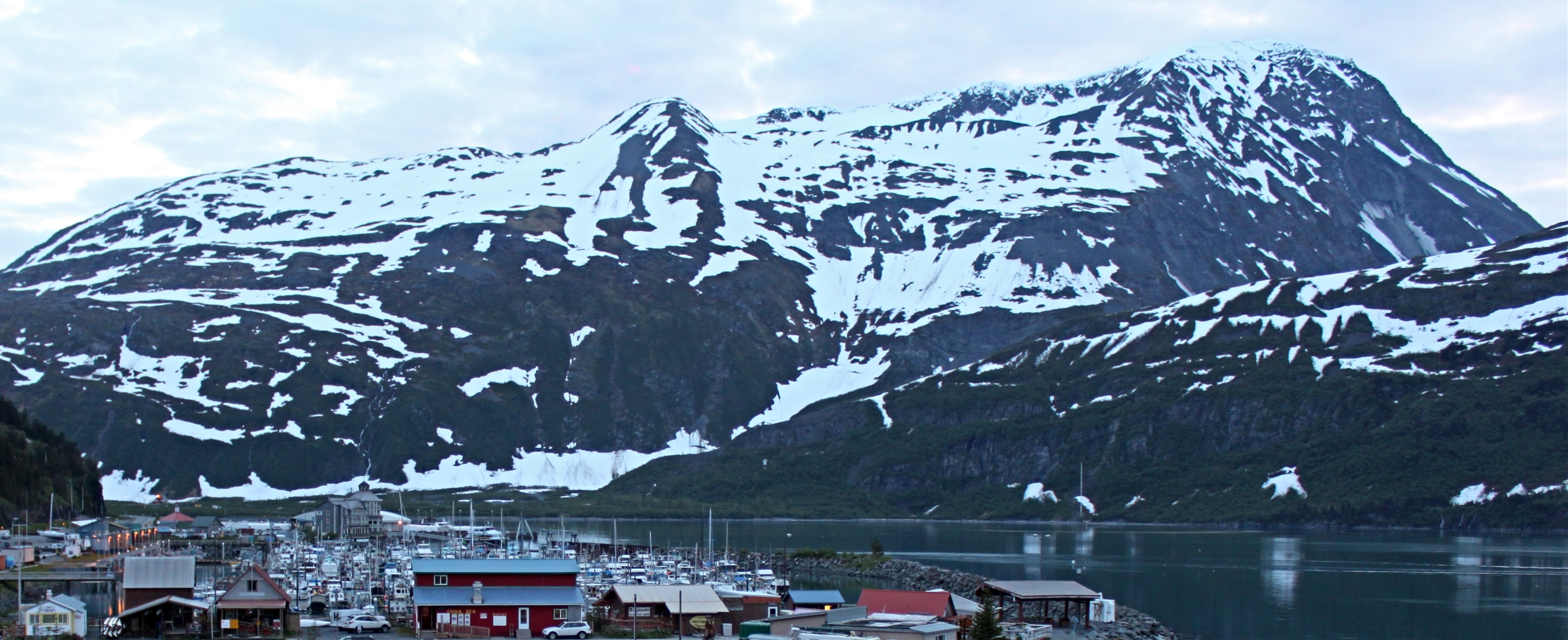
Maynard Mountain seen from Whittier

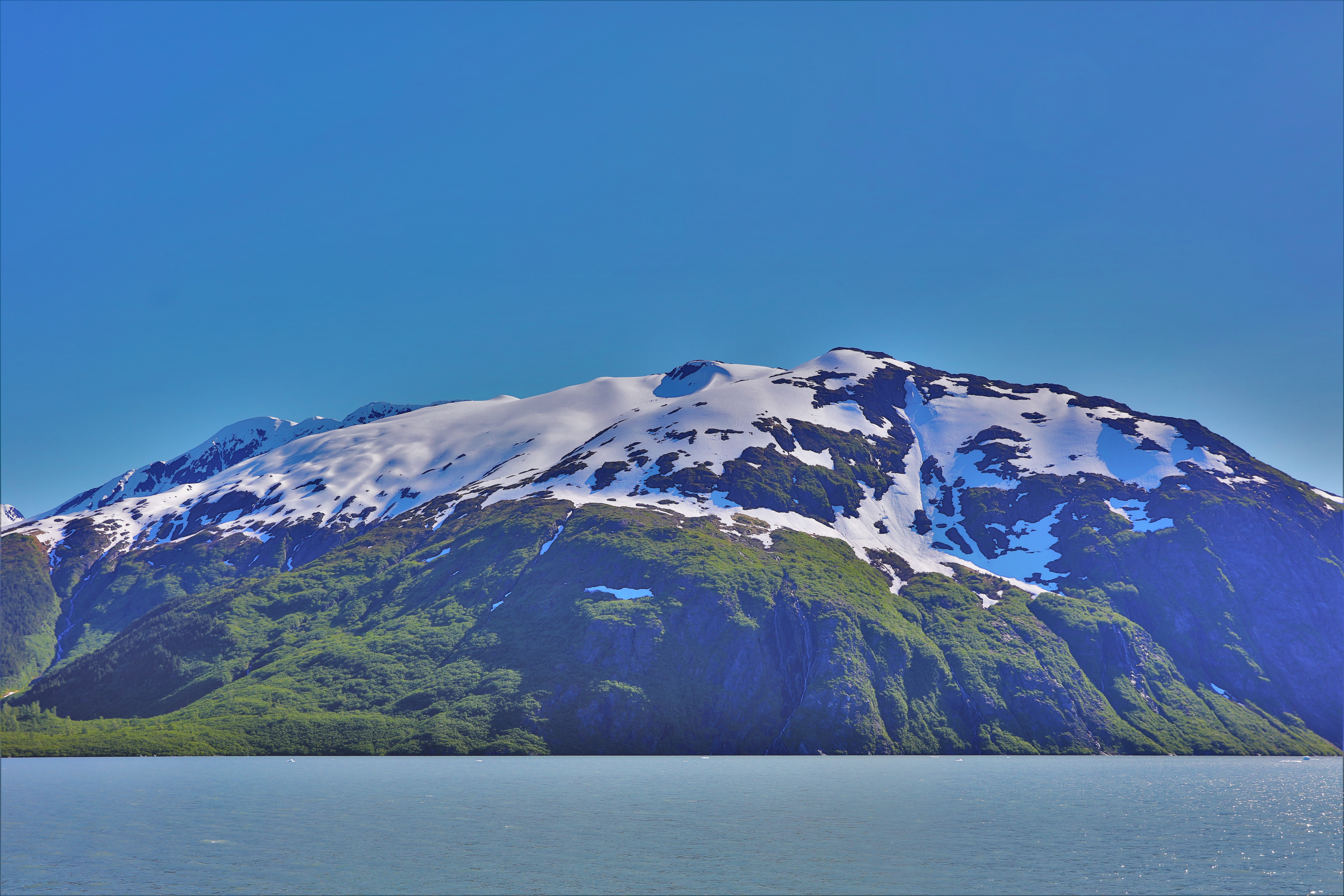
Maynard Mountain and Portage Lake

== See also ==
- List of mountain peaks of Alaska
- Geography of Alaska
