= Portage Township, Indiana =

Portage Township, Indiana may refer to one of the following places:

- Portage Township, Porter County, Indiana
- Portage Township, St. Joseph County, Indiana

== See also ==
- Portage Township (disambiguation)
