= Portage Glacier Highway =

Highway in Alaska, United States

- Whittier Access Road
- Portage Glacier Highway highlighted in red

Route information
- Maintained by Alaska DOT&PF
- Length: 11.59 mi (18.65 km)
- Existed: June 7, 2000–present

Major junctions
- West end: AK-1 (Seward Highway) in Portage
- East end: Alaska Marine Highway ferry terminal in Whittier

Location
- Country: United States
- State: Alaska
- Boroughs: Municipality of Anchorage, Unorganized

Highway system
- Alaska Routes; Interstate; Scenic Byways

The Portage Glacier Highway, or Portage Glacier Road, is a highway located in the U.S. state of Alaska. The highway is made up of a series of roads, bridges, and tunnels that connect the Portage Glacier area of the Chugach National Forest and the city of Whittier to the Seward Highway. Most of the highway travels through mainly rural areas just north of the Kenai Peninsula, with the Anton Anderson Memorial Tunnel passing under Maynard Mountain, part of the Chugach Mountain Range. Parts of the route were first constructed in the early 1900s, and the entire highway was completed on June 7, 2000, as part of the Whittier Access Project. The main portion of the highway traveling from the western terminus to the Begich, Boggs Visitor Center at Portage Lake is designated as National Forest Highway 35 by the United States Forest Service (USFS).

== Route description ==
The portion of the Portage Glacier Highway traveling from the Seward Highway to the Begich, Boggs Visitor Center is designated as part of Forest Highway 35, a Federal Forest Highway (FFH). Forest Highways are funded and administered by the USFS and the Federal Highway Administration; the system was created by the Federal Aid Highway Act of 1921. FFH-35 is one of the 33 Forest Highways that are currently designated in Alaska.

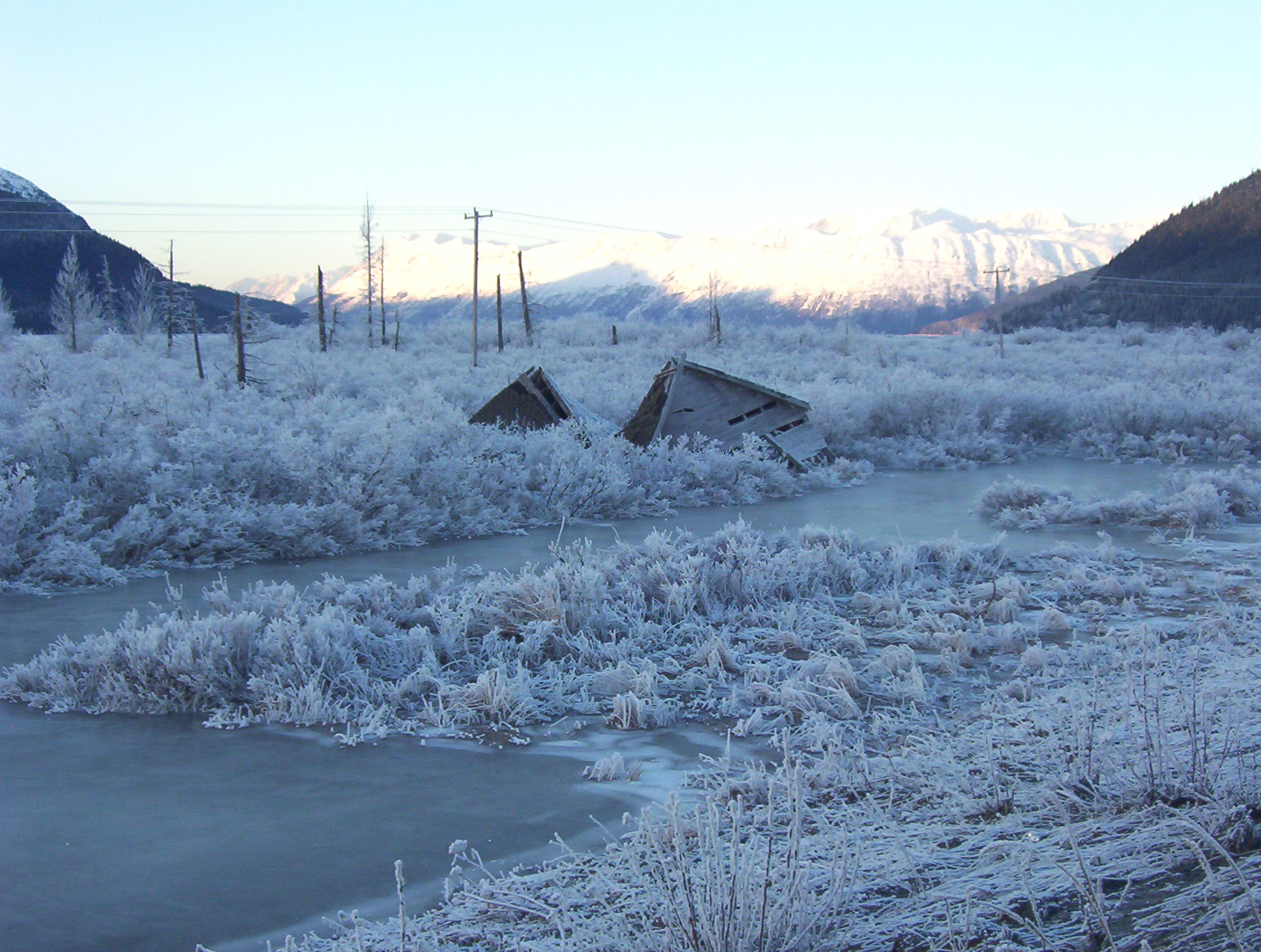
The ruins of the former town of Portage, destroyed in 1964

=== Chugach National Forest ===
The Portage Glacier Highway begins at an at-grade intersection with the Seward Highway in the former town of Portage. At this point, the highway is a two-lane, asphalt road. Almost immediately after the Seward Highway intersection, the road crosses over the Coastal Classic line of the Alaska Railroad. The highway continues in a southeasterly direction along the Portage Valley, with Portage Creek to the north and pine forests to the south. After about 1.2 miles (1.9 km), the roadway intersects a small gravel road that leads to the Moose Flats Day Use area, which has access to several scenic hiking trails. Peaks of the Chugach Mountains, along with several hanging glaciers, can be seen from the road; Portage Glacier is out of view. The highway passes through a low-lying wetland before reentering forest and providing access to the Alder Pond Day Use area and the Portage Valley RV park.

Portage Glacier Highway continues southeastward, providing access to the Black Bear Campgrounds, maintained by the USFS. The roadway bends eastward, passing the USFS Williwaw Campgrounds, as well as several small gravel roads. The road continues for a short distance before passing the Begich, Boggs Visitor Center and associated buildings, comprising the headquarters of Portage Glacier unit of the Chugach National Forest. The highway continues onto the Portage Creek Bridge, which is 114 feet (35 m) long. It allows the highway to cross over the small Portage Creek, which drains Portage Lake, in turn fed by Portage Glacier. The bridge ends at the start of the Portage Lake Tunnel. The tunnel is 445 feet (136 m) long and constructed of concrete. The route proceeds to a 0.5 mi (0.8 km) portion of road known as the "Rock Cut at Portage Lake" by the Alaska Department of Transportation & Public Facilities (DOT&PF). This road passes along the coast of Portage Lake and borders a large, man-made cliff to the north (hence the name "Rock Cut"). This portion of the route terminates at the Placer Creek Bridge. The bridge, which is just 83 feet (25 m) long, spans Placer Creek, the smaller of the two creeks feeding Portage Lake. The highway continues to the six-lane Bear Valley Staging area and the toll booth for the Anton Anderson Memorial Tunnel. The road continues into the Anton Anderson Memorial Tunnel.

=== Anton Anderson Memorial Tunnel ===
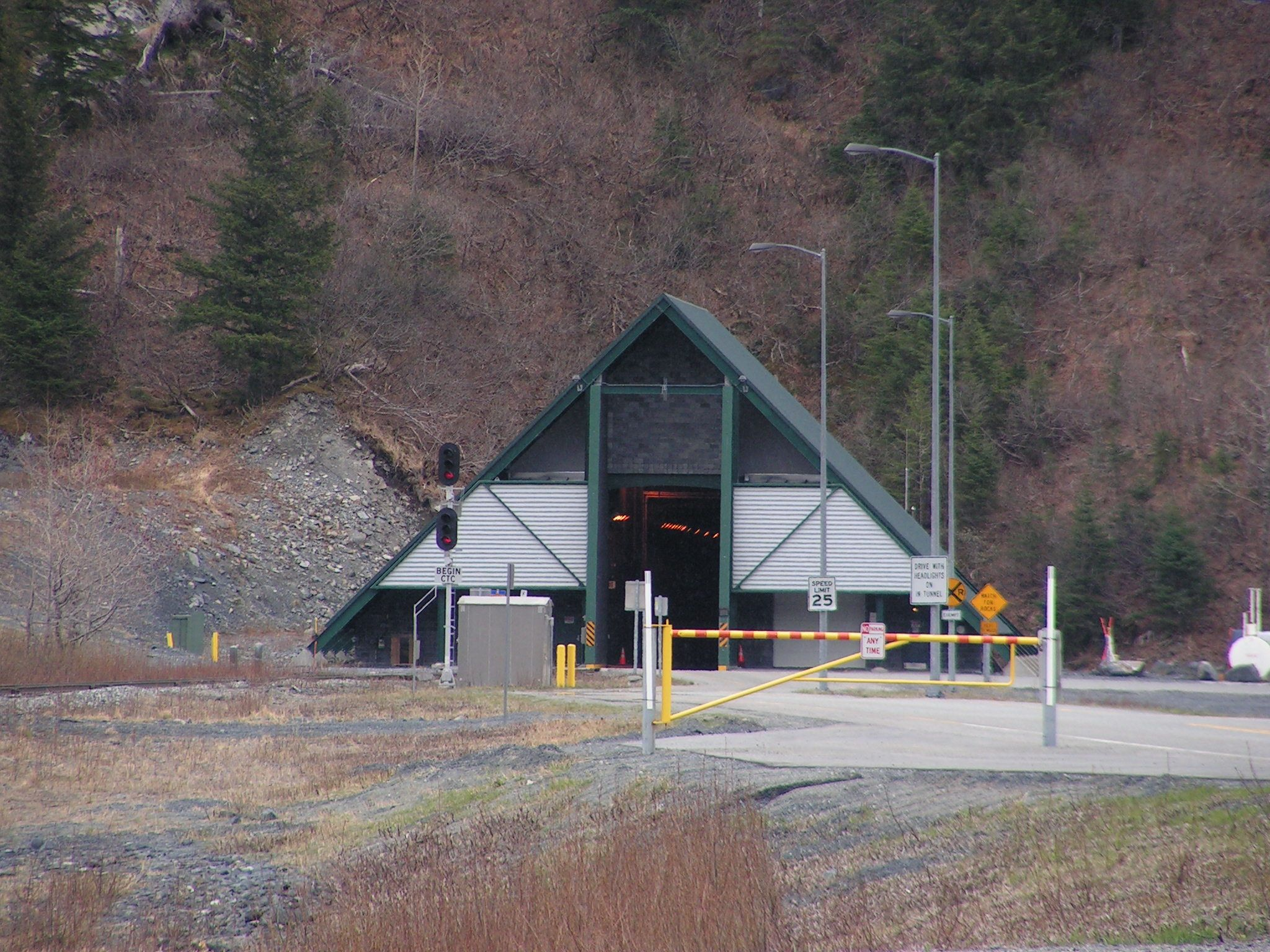
Anton Anderson Memorial Tunnel, Portage Glacier Entrance

The Anton Anderson Memorial Tunnel, often called the Whittier Tunnel after the town at its eastern terminus, is a dual-use (bimodal) highway and railroad tunnel that passes under Maynard Mountain. The tunnel is at 60.783°N 148.765°W. At a length of 13,300 ft (4,100 m), or 2.51 miles, it is the longest highway tunnel and longest combined rail and highway tunnel in North America. The tunnel originated as a rail-only tunnel, excavated in 1941–1942. The tunnel was upgraded to bimodal use by the Kiewit Construction Company between September 1998 and mid-summer 2000. In 1976 it was renamed in memory of Anton Anderson (1892–1960), chief engineer of the Alaska Railroad and under whose supervision the tunnel had been built.

The redesigned tunnel is fitted with a combined single uni-directional highway lane and single-track railway. The floor of the tunnel is constructed of 1,800 texturized concrete panels, each 7.5 by 8 feet (2.29 by 2.44 m), with the railroad tracks sunken slightly below the road surface. The interior is exposed rock, and contains several "safe-houses", which are small buildings that are used in case of severe earthquakes, vehicle fires, or other emergencies. The tunnel also contains several pull-outs, which are reserved for disabled vehicles. As motor vehicle speed in the tunnel is limited to 25 miles per hour (40 km/h), it takes about ten minutes to travel from end to end. The tunnel uses a combination of portal fans and reversible jet fans to ensure proper air flow and air quality throughout the tunnel. There are two backup generators to ensure that the computerized traffic controls and safe-house ventilation systems in the tunnel continue to function in the event of a power failure.

The tunnel can accommodate either eastbound traffic, westbound traffic, or the Alaska Railroad but only one at any given time. Because rail and road traffic must share the tunnel, it is coordinated by two computer-based systems — the Tunnel Control System and the Train Signal System. These systems control the timing of vehicles entering the tunnel, spacing them for safety, and lower railroad gates when a train is approaching. The tunnel's entrance portals are designed in an A-shape, with a large, train-sized "garage door", which allows traffic in and out of the tunnel. The entrance portals are designed to withstand the force of an avalanche. The tunnel's eastern terminus is in Whittier. The staging areas on either end of the tunnel can accommodate as many as 450 vehicles waiting to pass through.

Vehicle convoys enter the tunnel in alternating directions every half hour. Scheduled and unscheduled trains can cause delays of up to 30 minutes. The tunnel operates from early morning until late evening on a schedule that varies seasonally and according to construction and maintenance needs. Larger or heavier vehicles have to be carried as rail transport. Pedestrians and bicycles are prohibited.

Track circuits in the tunnel had problems because of moisture; in 2015 these were replaced with axle counters.

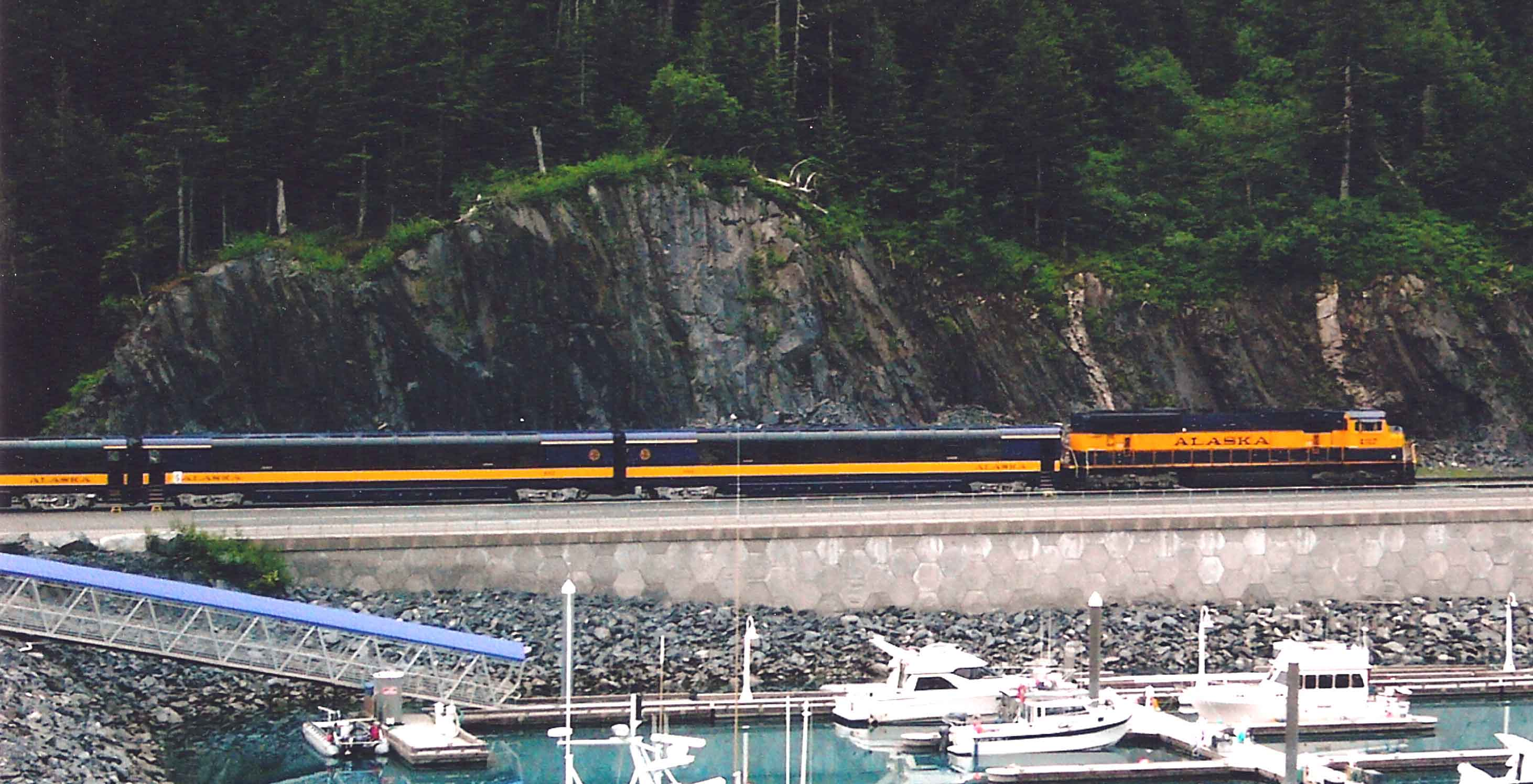
The Portage Glacier Highway and the Alaska Railroad passing the Whittier Harbor

=== Whittier ===
After exiting the tunnel, the highway enters the nine-lane Whittier staging area, where it passes several of the tunnel's automated control systems. Before traveling past the single-runway Whittier Airport, the route intersects two small roads, one of which is the Portage Pass Trail access route. Running parallel to the Alaska Railroad line, the route - now named West Camp Road - continues between the Passage Canal and several mountains for approximately 0.5 miles (0.80 km). Passing by the Cliffside Marina and the Alaska Railroad Whittier Depot, the route crosses over Whittier Creek before immediately making a left onto Whittier Street, crossing the railroad and bending southeastward and traveling past a large parking lot, the headquarters. Traveling past several businesses making up central Whittier as well as the city park, used for Whittier Parking and Camping, the highway turns east and intersects Glacier Avenue, as well as a short pedestrian pathway. The roadway continues through central Whittier before reaching a four-way intersection with Blackstone Road, Eastern Avenue, and Depot Road, after which the route transfers to the latter. The road continues along Passage Canal for a short distance, while traveling towards the Alaska Marine Highway (AMHS) pier. Depot Road splits away from the highway, which continues for a short distance along Dock Access Road before reaching its eastern terminus, the AMHS pier.

=== Traffic ===
The highway is maintained by the Alaska Department of Transportation & Public Facilities (AkDOT&PF). Part of the job of the AkDOT&PF is to measure traffic along the highway. These counts are taken using a metric called annual average daily traffic (AADT). This is a statistical calculation of the average daily number of vehicles that travel along a portion of the highway. The estimated AADT for the Portage Glacier Highway is 1,030 vehicles. In addition to taking AADT, the AkDOT&PF also takes monthly and yearly counts for the highway. The road's yearly traffic count for 2010 was 234,738 vehicles. The roadway's highest monthly traffic is in mid-summer, when an average of nearly 50,000 vehicles use the tunnel each month. The highway's lowest monthly traffic is in late winter, when the average monthly traffic is only about 6,000. The monthly and yearly counts are taken at the entrance to the Anton Anderson Memorial Tunnel. The entire length of the highway is designated as an Intermodal Connector Route, part of the National Highway System (NHS), a network of roads important to the country's economy, defense, and mobility.

== Scenic and recreational opportunities ==
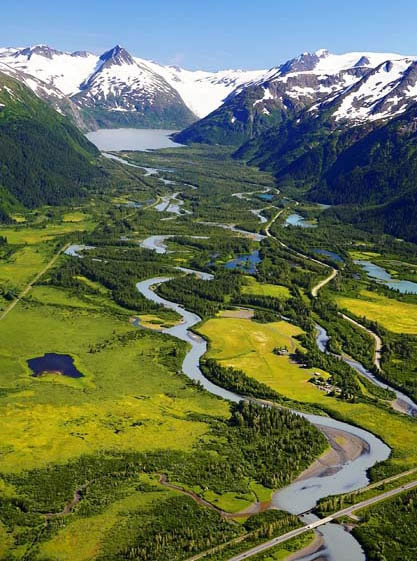
The Portage Valley, focusing on the Portage Creek

The Portage Glacier Highway offers numerous scenic and recreational opportunities, mostly located along the section designated as FFH-35. A short, 0.25 miles (0.40 km) long boardwalk trail and the 4.6 miles (7.4 km) long Trail of Blue Ice are accessible through the Moose Flats Day-Use area. A viewing area for the Explorer Glacier is located near milepost 2, and a turnout for the Portage River is located near milepost 3. Near milepost 4 is the Williwaw fish viewing observation deck, which allows travelers to view spawning salmon in July through September. The 2 miles (3.2 km) long loop Williwaw Nature Trail is accessible through the Williwaw Campground. The trail provides views of the Middle Glacier. At the turnout for the Begich, Boggs Visitor Center is the Byron Glacier Trail as well as several others. The Portage Glacier can be seen on a short cruise on the M/V Ptarmigan; the glacier is no longer visible from the road. Past milepost 6 is a turnout for the Byron Glacier and Portage Lake.

Moose can be seen along the highway, as well as black and brown bears. Bald eagles can occasionally be seen from the highway. During spring and autumn, migrating species of ducks, geese, swans, and cranes can be seen throughout the region. Spawning salmon species of sockeye, chum, and coho can be seen in Portage Creek. Several unique species of wildflowers are found along several of the trails in the area. Whittier annually holds the Walk to Whittier, which is an event where pedestrians walk through the Anton Anderson Memorial Tunnel to Whittier, the only time pedestrians may use the tunnel. The event has been held since 2002, except it was not held in 2010. The walk traditionally takes place in June.

== Tolls ==
A toll is charged for access through the Anton Anderson Tunnel. The fees are collected from vehicles traveling eastbound. The fee for a regular vehicle is $13, as is the price for motorcycles. Vehicles pulling trailers must pay a higher toll, set at $22. Small buses and regular RVs are charged $38, while large buses must pay $137. Oversize and unusually sized vehicles, those 10 to 11 feet (3.0 to 3.4 m) wide and 14 to 15 feet (4.3 to 4.6 m) high must pay $330 per use. Vehicles that are exempt from paying tolls are those owned by the Alaska Railroad, the DOT&PF, or any emergency or law enforcement vehicle. Any vehicles owned or operated by any state government agency or school district pay $11.

Seasonal passes are also available for normal-sized cars, trucks and motorcycles, and are priced at over $600. The average passenger vehicle toll cost per mile is $39.42, while the average per-mile vehicle price for trucks is $39.52. The tunnel is operated on a strict time schedule, with vehicles being allowed in for 15 minutes from each direction before alternating to the other. The tunnel is open from 5:30 a.m. to 11:15 p.m. during summer months, and from 7:00 a.m. to 10:45 p.m. during winter months.

== History ==
=== Native trail ===
The earliest evidence of the Portage Valley being used for transportation dates back to early A.D, when the Inuit used the flat, low-lying valley as a pass through the Chugach Mountains. The Dena'ina people continued using the valley as a passage between Cochrane Bay and the Turnagain Arm. They used Portage Creek for fishing purposes and established a series of trails along the creek. Russian fur traders and early settlers continued to use the valley, establishing a trail along the creek and the Portage and Burns glaciers. It was possible for boats to travel through the valley by using the Passage Canal and the creek up until 1913. The trail was usable until 1939, due to the continuous recession of the Portage Glacier. The final party to attempt to use the trail that year was forced to climb 3,000 feet (914 m) up the Portage Shoulder to avoid the drop-offs and crevasses that had formed along the trail.

=== Railroad development ===
... (A hub) of roads will grow out of Anchorage because of its strategic location as the head of defenses in the Territory. The switching of the railroad from Seward to Portage Bay will also come within the near future, and for the same reason.

— General Simon Buckner, the U.S. Armed Forces plan for Alaska, October 15, 1940.

In 1940, the U.S. government realized that it needed to reevaluate its territories, including Alaska. Alaska was declared a vulnerable attack target, as was the existing railroad connecting Anchorage and Seward. The U.S. Armed Forces began planning for new roads and railroads, and on October 15, 1940, General Simon Bolivar Buckner, Jr. announced those plans. The plan called for the existing railroad to be transferred to Whittier, and for the construction of a road to Seward (the Seward Highway), a road to the Richardson Highway (the Glenn Highway and the Tok Cut-Off), and a road to the Portage Valley (the Portage Glacier Highway). Less than a week after the announcement of the plan, surveying of the area around Whittier was taking place in order to make sure of the safety of building the railroad terminal. The project was strongly opposed by the city of Seward, but after the survey was complete, the project was definite.

In early 1941, large groups of people from the Kenai Peninsula traveled to Washington, D.C. to protest the moving of the railroad. Despite the opposition, on April 3, 1941, U.S. Congress passed a bill providing the project with $5.3 million (equivalent to $116,012,400 respectively in 2025). In late April, the U.S. Army's 177th Engineering group began work on clearing and grading the former native trail. The U.S. Army hired the West Construction Company of Boston, Massachusetts, to assist in the construction of the future railroad's two tunnels. West Construction and the Army began working on the tunnel under Mount Maynard in late August 1941. The first boring of the tunnel began on the east side of the mountain, and shortly afterwards, construction on the west side began. Winter hindered the construction of the tunnel until mid November, when a small "snowshed" building was constructed. The U.S. entered World War II on December 8, 1941, after the Japanese bombing of Pearl Harbor. This sparked the need for the completion of the tunnel earlier than expected. By the end of 1941, workers had tunneled more than 170 feet (52 m) into Maynard Mountain.

Work on the tunnel rapidly increased into the summer of 1942. Large areas of the rock were blasted away with dynamite. The material removed from the tunnel was used as grading material for other parts of the railway. Supplies were received behind schedule, mainly due to the war. This hindered progress on the tunnel. In June 1942, Japanese forces attacked and invaded the Alaskan islands of Attu and Kiska, again provoking the need to complete the tunnels sooner. The winter conditions of 1942 and 1943 slowed the progress of the tunnels. Work on the railroad continued until April 23, 1943, when the project was completed. Anton Anderson, the lead engineer for the tunnels and namesake for the tunnel to Whittier, was not present when the railroad was used for the first time, fearing the Whittier Tunnel was not ready.

=== Early roads ===
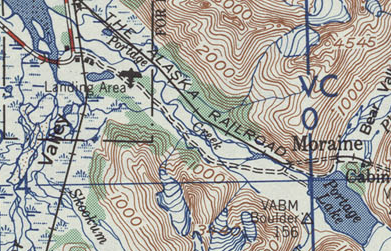
The road preceding Portage Glacier Highway, in 1955

The U.S. army established a series of simple earthen roads while constructing the railroad spur. This was the first road to exist in the Portage Valley. Whittier began to grow after the completion of the railroad spur. The port boomed in the mid-1940s, with the population reaching over 1,000. The city, including roads, began to form. By 1953, the earthen road in Portage Valley had generally been relocated near the location of the present highway. Also around that time, a road in Whittier in the location of the present highway existed as a graded, dirt road. The highway was probably paved sometime between 1965 and 1967, and three small bridges along the route were constructed, all of which are still used today.

=== Highway studies and proposals ===
Between the late 1950s and the early 1960s, the U.S. military pulled out of Whittier, allowing the town to grow as a commercial port. Whittier's location made it a large tourist location, and after the military pullout, travel to Whittier grew massively. In addition to the state's paving of the highway, the Alaska Railroad began offering shuttle services between Portage and Whittier in the mid-1960s. The Alaska Railroad would allow vehicles to drive onto flatcars, which would then be transported by train through the Anton Anderson Memorial Tunnel to Whittier. The number of people visiting Whittier grew progressively, bringing with it a larger number of requests for a more convenient and affordable way of transportation to Whittier. During the late 1970s, a proposal was put forward for a road to Whittier. In preparation for the highway, Anchorage businessman Pete Zamarello purchased the Buckner Building, and planned to convert it into a resort. However, the highway proposal fell through. In 1981, the AkDOT&PF began to study possible alternatives to the railroad, which would have cost anywhere between $10 million and $68 million.

In 1993, the AkDOT&PF finally initiated the study for the alternative transportation system to Whittier. The project would be named the "Whittier Access Project". The AkDOT&PF authorized HDR Alaska to conduct the study. The study presented five solutions — increasing the existing flatcar service, installing a high-speed electric rail service, constructing a series of highways over the mountain range, building a highway and tunnels through the mountain range, and constructing a highway to the existing railroad tunnel and expanding the tunnel to withstand motor vehicles. After consulting with members of the Alaska Railroad, the general public, and highway and tunnel engineers, the AkDOT&PF decided to proceed with the last option, involving the expansion of the Anton Anderson Memorial Tunnel and the construction of a highway. In November 1995, an environmental impact statement, created by HDR Alaska, was approved by the Federal Highway Administration, allowing the project to proceed.

See

=== Whittier Access Project ===
In March 1996, the state of Alaska announced its final plans for the construction of the Whittier Access Project. The project was predicted to cost around $50 million, and the project was planned to begin later that year. However, the project was met with much controversy, and by December 1996, the project still had not begun. The cost of construction was reevaluated to be around $60 million, and the project was planned to begin in March 1997. Construction of the Whittier Access Project finally began on May 6, 1997. Then-governor of Alaska Tony Knowles began the construction when he detonated six pounds of explosives located on Begich Peak, although this was unrelated to the project. On May 22, 1997, construction of the project was halted. Carl S. Armbrister, the Director of the Office of Planning and Program Development for the Federal Highway Administration's 10th Region and head of the project was sued by several environmental agencies and tourism groups, headed by the Alaska Center for the Environment (ACE). The ACE brought the suit against Armbrister on the grounds that the project violated section 4(f) of the Department of Transportation Act of 1966, which requires that all environmental impacts of a project be assessed and that a project "[has] no feasible and prudent alternative". The ACE held that a new highway was not needed and improving the existing rail service was a prudent and feasible option. However, one day after construction was stopped, a judicial ruling was issued permitting work to continue. Construction continued for a week, until May 31, but was then halted again due to the lawsuit. Work on the project was ruled off until at least mid-July of that year.

[u]nlike the city of Memphis, Alaska is not limited to a few `green havens.' ... In a very real sense the entire State of Alaska, 1/5 the size of the continental United States, is a giant park.

— District judge James Keith Singleton, Jr.'s opinion

James Keith Singleton, Jr., the district judge overseeing the case, ruled in favor of Armbrister and the Federal Highway Administration and stated that the agency was correct in its decision against improved rail service. The suit was compared to the landmark 1971 case Citizens to Preserve Overton Park v. Volpe, wherein the Supreme Court of the United States ruled in favor of Memphis, Tennessee citizens attempting to protect Overton Park from a plan to route Interstate 40 through 26 acres (11 ha) of its forest. However, unlike in that case, the Whittier Access project was found to be the only feasible solution for a link to Whittier. The ACE appealed the decision and the case went to the Ninth Circuit Court of Appeals. The court upheld Singleton's decision, finding that the project only affected a very small amount of parkland and that the road was necessary to meet the requirements for a link to the city. These rulings were legally significant as they appeared to overturn the precedent established in the Overton Park case, which was interpreted as saying that "it must be shown that the implications of not building [a] highway pose an 'unusual situation'".

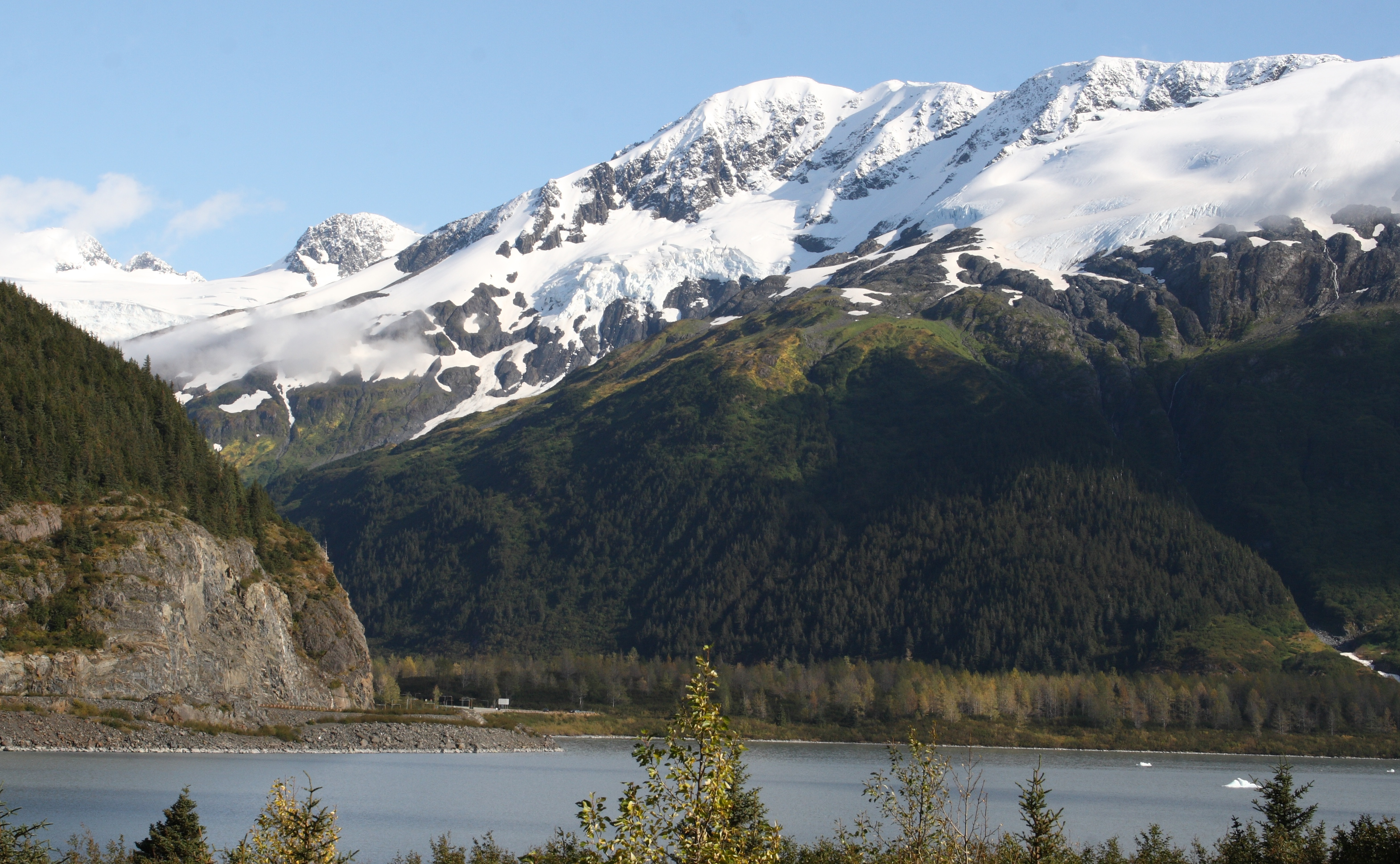
A view of the Rock Cut at Portage Lake, which was constructed as part of the project. Maynard Mountain shown.

Work on the project was finally approved following the Ninth Circuit's decision. The lawsuit had put the project, which had been planned to be completed by the end of 1998, far behind schedule. The first phase of construction consisted of building the Portage Creek Bridge and the construction of a new tunnel through Begich Peak. The contract for the phase had been awarded prior to the lawsuit, but work on the components was not completed until very late in 1998. A temporary bridge was built over Portage Creek so that the tunnel could be constructed. The final part of the phase was replacing the temporary bridge over Portage Creek. The structure was designed so that it would appear to fit with the environment but could also withstand the regular seismic activity of the region and have a minimal impact on the surrounding fish and plant populations. CH2M Hill was selected to design the approximately 1.5 miles (2.4 km) of highway that would connect the existing road to the Anton Anderson Tunnel. Construction of the highway, done by Herndon and Thompson Inc., was finished before tunnel work began.

The Kiewit Construction Company, based in Omaha, Nebraska, was awarded the contract for phase two, redesigning the Anton Anderson Tunnel. Kiewit began planning the tunnel design in June 1998, and began work on the project sometime around September. The first part of the tunnel construction involved vertically and horizontally expanding the existing rock walls. Beginning from the western entrance, Kiewit drilled away several feet of the rock face from the top of the tunnel and installed a net to prevent any potential rockfalls. They then drilled sideways, clearing space for the nine vehicle turnaround areas. However, work on the tunnel was hindered by several different events. While crews were working on the tunnel, a drunken Whittier resident drove his or her truck into the tunnel and got it stuck on the rails. On October 23, a thirteen-car train derailed at the western entrance. Although no workers were injured, a substantial amount of the equipment was destroyed. In addition to the accidents, crews had to work in extreme weather. Kiewit claims that workers had to deal with "winds of more than 120 mph, minus 40 degree temperatures and snow up to 43 feet deep" and wind chills that would drop to around −80 °F (−62 °C). An avalanche also at one point halted construction for four days.

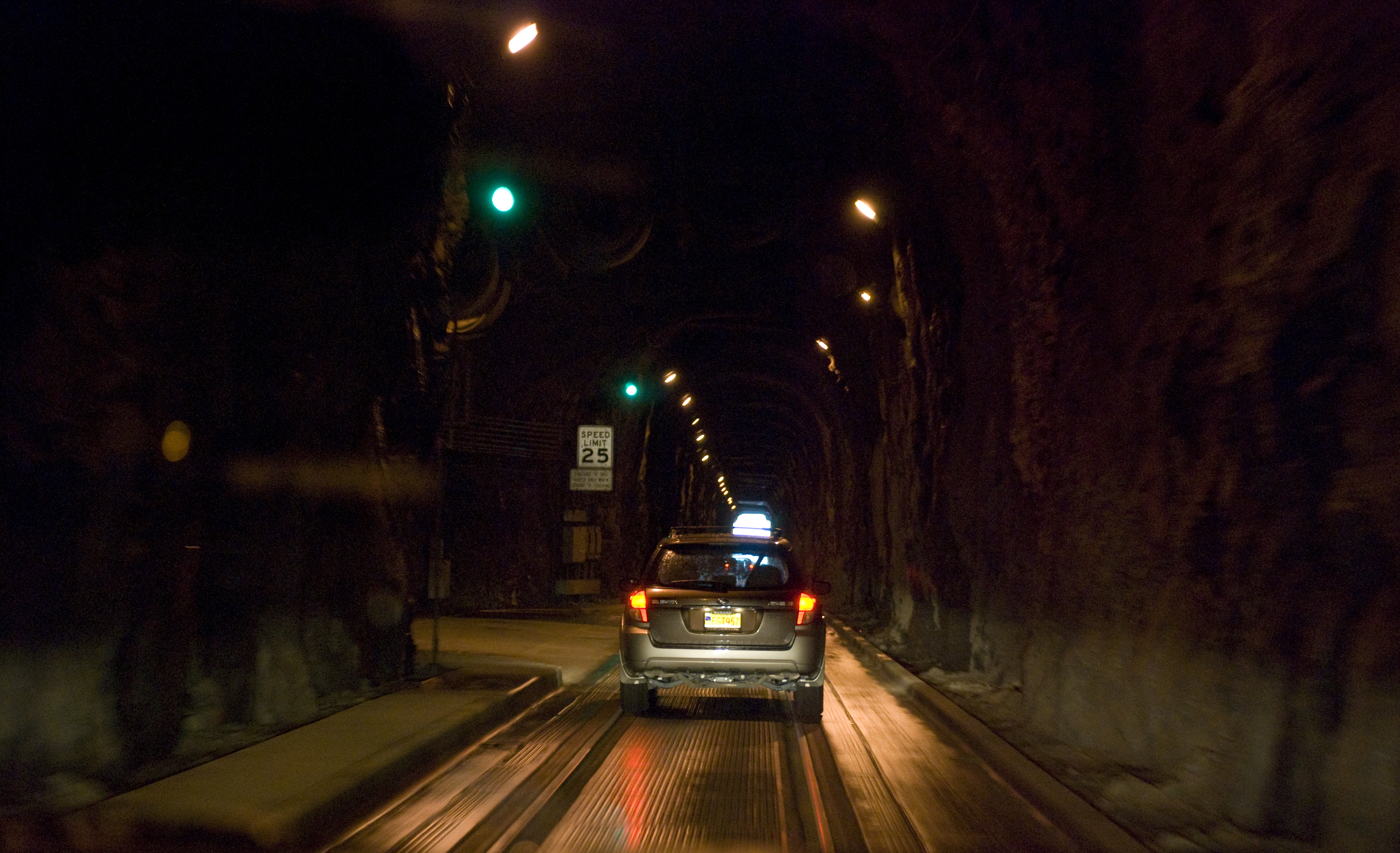
The inside of the tunnel, which was expanded and redesigned during the project

Despite the conditions, the crews were forced to do much of the work during the winter, since the project had to adjust to the train schedule. Trains ran daily during the summer, so work was restricted to about nine-hour shifts during the night. During winter months, trains were only operating during four days each week. When a train was scheduled to come through the tunnel, crews reported they had to spend "up to two hours breaking down equipment, getting it all outside and waiting for the train to pass before heading back into the mountain". Following expansion of the tunnel, one of the first steps the crews took was to demolish the existing entrance portals. Once they were destroyed, the existing rail was removed in sections. Pre-cast panels were laid where the tracks had been, before the old rail was put back and secured to the panels. While that was being completed, some crews installed a series of anti-icing insulation panels and drainage pipes to keep the tunnel clear during winter months.

Construction work was completed on schedule, in early 2000. The town of Whittier began a number of improvements to help adjust for the road's opening. Among these were more parking facilities and increasing public restrooms. The town government also approved of several long-term changes to the city that would begin after the road was opened, including a second harbor, a bicycle trail, a new sidewalk system, and shopping center. The official opening ceremony was held on June 7 and was marked by protests from environmentalists. A group of three of them chained themselves together in the middle of the road in an attempt to block traffic, while another group of about twenty hung banners and waved signs. The ceremony was attended by around 300 people. Then-governor Knowles performed a ribbon-cutting and rode through the tunnel in a 1954-model Cadillac.

== Major junctions ==
Borough	Location	mi	km	Destinations	Notes
Municipality of Anchorage		0.00	0.00	AK-1 (Seward Highway)	Western terminus. Western end of FFH-35 designation
Municipality of Anchorage		5.01	8.06	FFH-35 (Portage Lake Loop)	Visitor Center access road. Eastern end of FFH-35 designation
Municipality of Anchorage		6.47	10.41	Toll plaza	
Municipality of Anchorage		6.82– 9.31	10.98– 14.98	Anton Anderson Memorial Tunnel	
Unorganized	Whittier	10.89	17.53	Whittier Street	Portage Glacier Highway transfers to Whittier Street
Unorganized	Whittier	11.06	17.80	Glacier Avenue	Access to central Whittier
Unorganized	Whittier	11.26	18.12	Depot Road	Portage Glacier Highway transfers to Depot Road
Unorganized	Whittier	11.59	18.65	Alaska State Ferry Dock	Eastern terminus and access to Alaska Marine Highway ferry terminal
1.000 mi = 1.609 km; 1.000 km = 0.621 mi: Concurrency terminus

== Related route ==
Forest Highway 35
- Location: Chugach National Forest
- Length: 6.59 mi (10.61 km)

Forest Highway 35 (FFH-35) is a Federal Forest Highway located entirely within Chugach National Forest. The highway is approximately 6.6 miles (10.6 km) long, and is mostly designated along the Portage Glacier Highway. The road serves the Portage Glacier branch of the park. FFH-35 begins at an intersection with the Seward Highway (AK-1) in Portage. The route follows the Portage Glacier Highway for approximately 5 miles (8.0 km), passing several park campgrounds and scenic turnouts. FFH 35 turns off the Portage Glacier Highway onto Portage Lake Loop Road, passing west of the Begich, Boggs Visitor Center Complex. The designation then shifts from Portage Lake Loop Road to Byron Glacier Road, which proceeds southward past low-lying marshland along Portage Lake. It continues past a small turnout area and travels over a small creek before proceeding eastward to its eastern terminus, a building and parking lot that make up part of the visitor center.

=== Major intersections ===
The entire highway is located within the Municipality of Anchorage, Alaska.

mi	km	Destinations	Notes
0.00	0.00	AK-1 (Seward Highway)	Western terminus
5.01	8.06	Portage Glacier Highway	End of designation along Portage Glacier Highway
5.12	8.24	Portage Visitor Center Road	
5.37	8.64	Byron Glacier Road	Beginning of designation along Byron Glacier Road
6.40	10.30	End of state alignment	State maintenance ends
6.59	10.61	Portage Glacier Observation Area Parking Lot	Eastern terminus
1.000 mi = 1.609 km; 1.000 km = 0.621 mi

== See also ==
- Glacier Discovery — the Alaska Railroad route that uses the Anton Anderson Tunnel
