= Portage Township, Ohio =

Portage Township, Ohio may refer to:

- Portage Township, Hancock County, Ohio
- Portage Township, Ottawa County, Ohio
- Portage Township, Wood County, Ohio

== See also ==
- Portage Township (disambiguation)
