= Shakespeare Shoulder =

Mountain in Alaska, United States

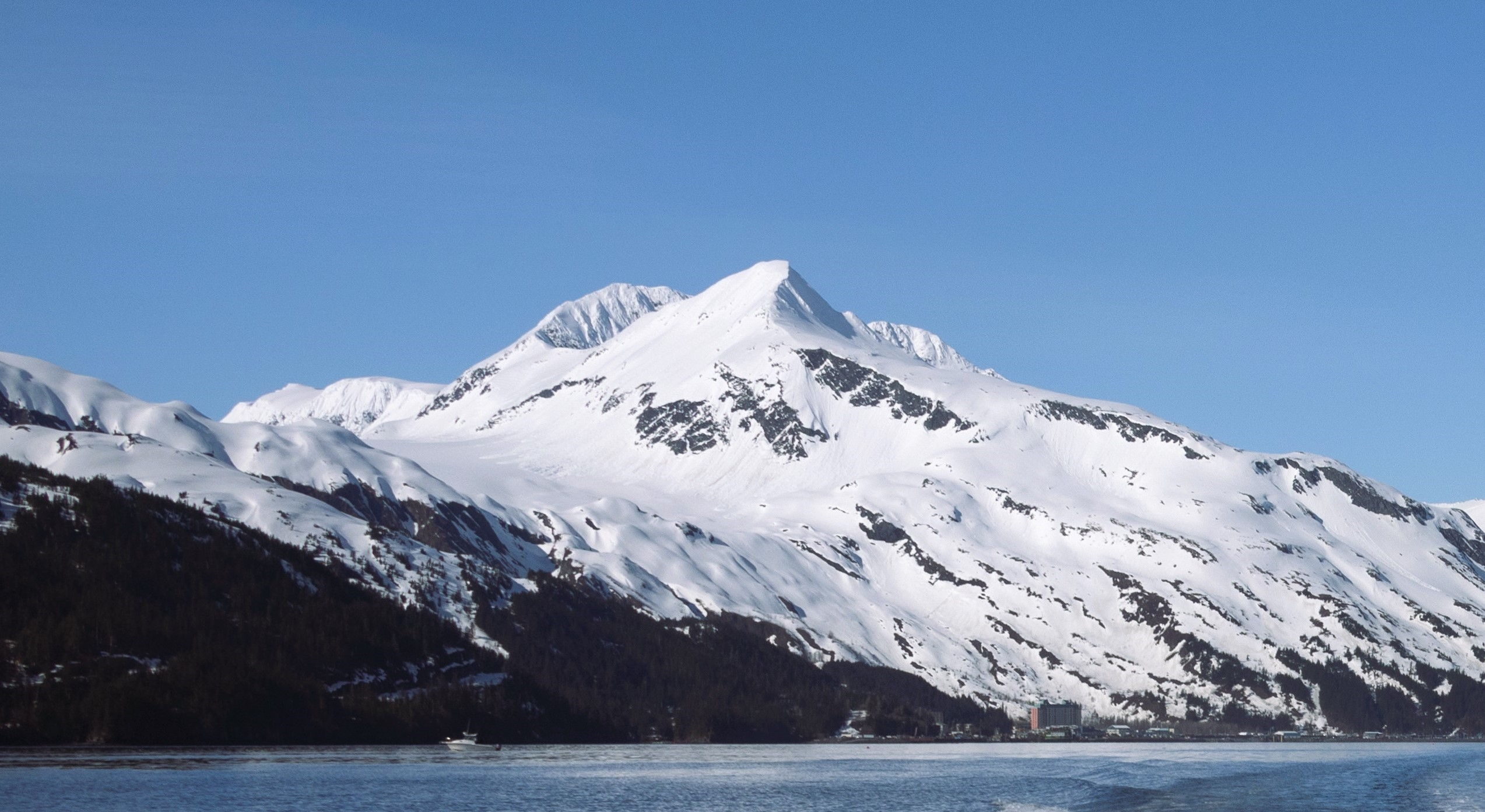
- Northeast aspect

Highest point
- Elevation: 3,517 ft (1,072 m)
- Prominence: 467 ft (142 m)
- Parent peak: Bard Peak
- Isolation: 0.69 mi (1.11 km)
- Coordinates: 60°45′08″N 148°42′59″W

Geography
- Location within Alaska
- Interactive map of Shakespeare Shoulder
- Country: United States
- State: Alaska
- Census Area: Chugach Census Area
- Protected area: Chugach National Forest
- Parent range: Kenai Mountains
- Topo map: USGS Seward D-5

Shakespeare Shoulder is a 3,517-foot (1,072 m) mountain summit located in the Kenai Mountains in the U.S. state of Alaska. The peak is situated 1.6 miles (2.6 km) southwest of Whittier, Alaska, in Chugach National Forest, at the isthmus of the Kenai Peninsula where the Kenai Mountains meet the Chugach Mountains. Although modest in elevation, topographic relief is significant since the summit rises from sea-level of Passage Canal in 1.6 miles (2.6 km). Shakespeare Shoulder is often seen and photographed with Bard Peak because they are in the background behind Portage Lake, a popular tourist and recreation destination. The mountain's toponym was officially adopted in 1977 by the United States Board on Geographic Names. The peak's name refers to William Shakespeare, known as The Bard of Avon.

== Climate ==
Based on the Köppen climate classification, Shakespeare Shoulder is located in a subarctic climate zone with long, cold, snowy winters, and mild summers. Winter temperatures can drop below 0 °F with wind chill factors below −10 °F. This climate supports the Shakespeare Glacier on the west slope of the mountain and the massive Whittier Glacier (named for John Greenleaf Whittier) on its southern and eastern slopes. The months of May and June offer the most favorable weather for viewing and climbing this mountain.

== Gallery ==
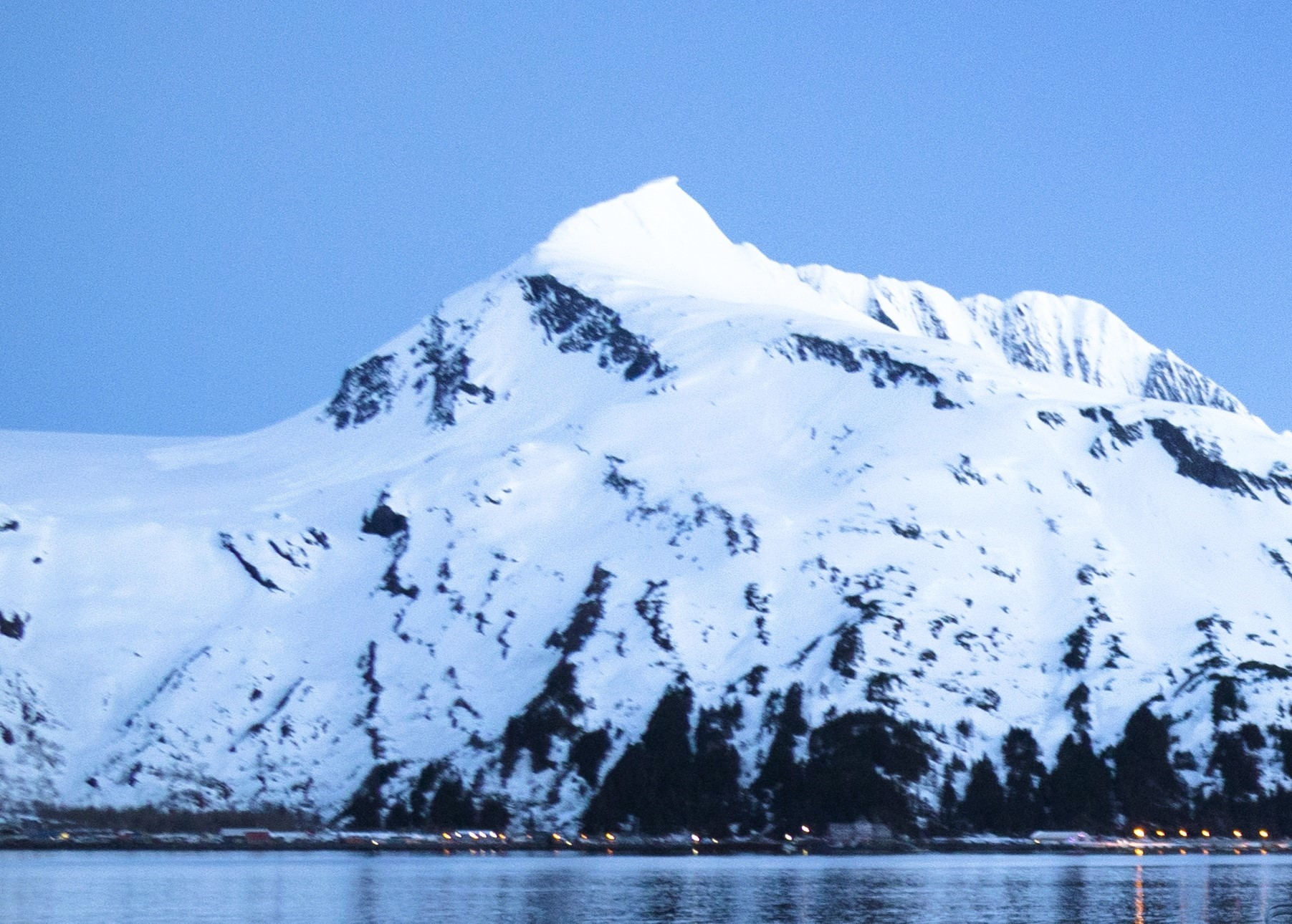
Northeast aspect above Whittier

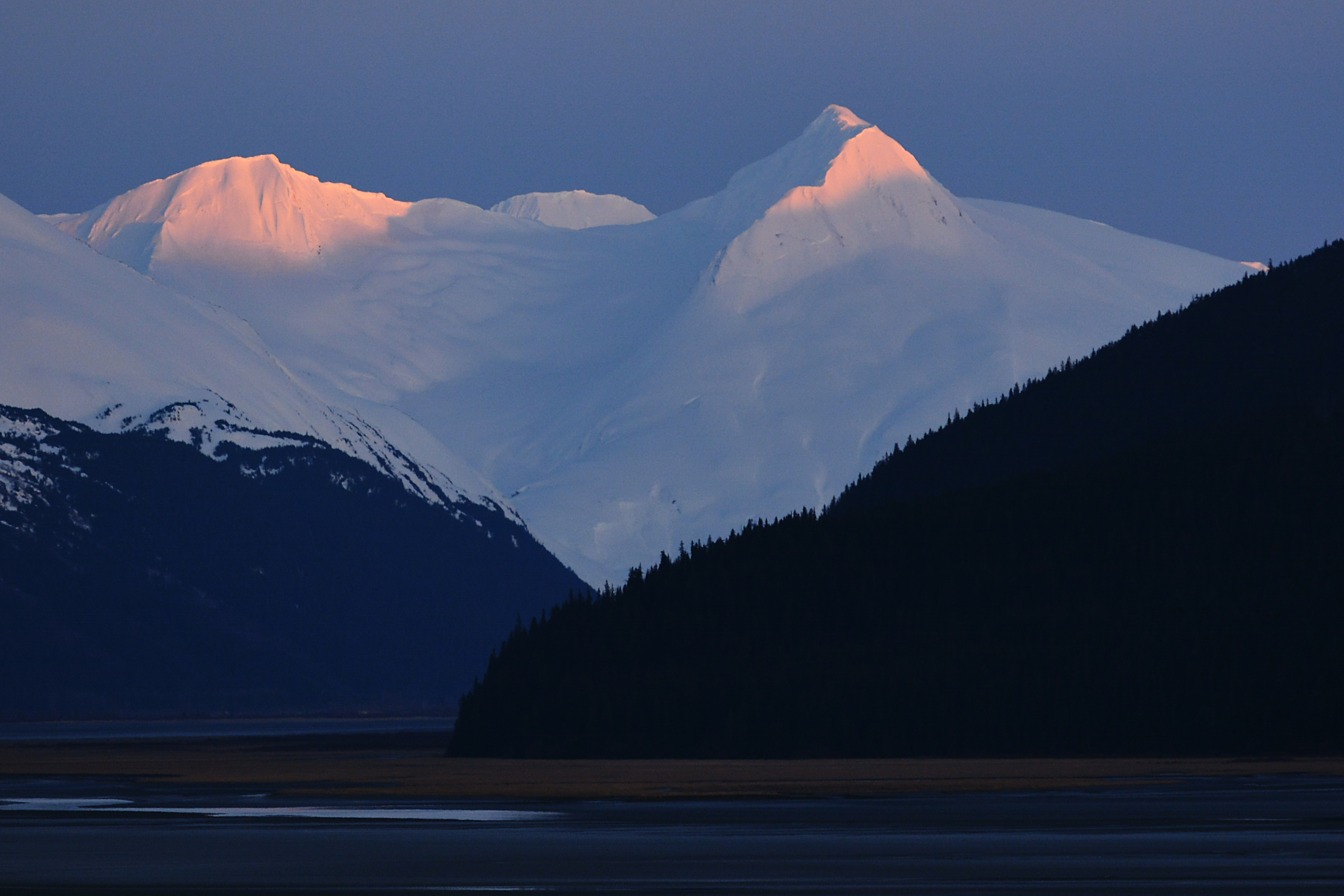
Shakespeare Shoulder (left) with Bard Peak (right)

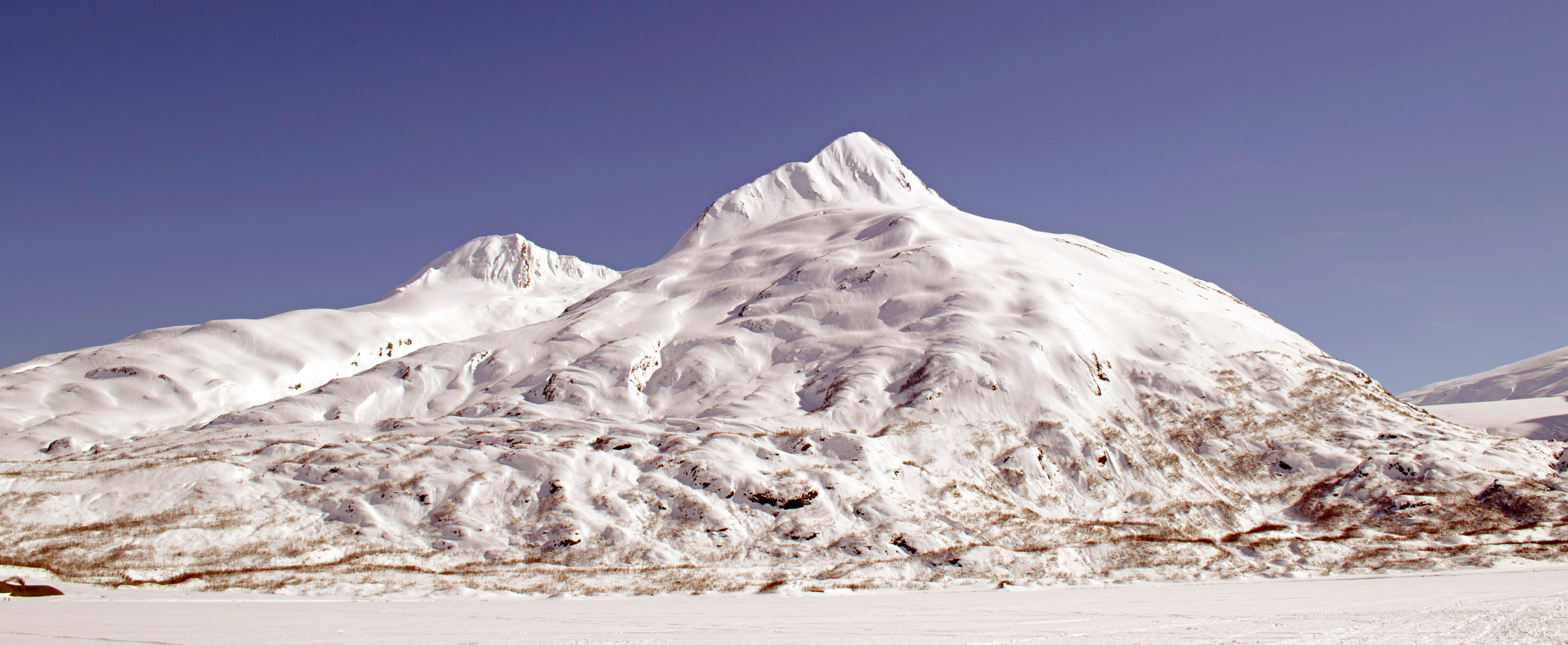
Bard Peak with Shakespeare Shoulder (left)

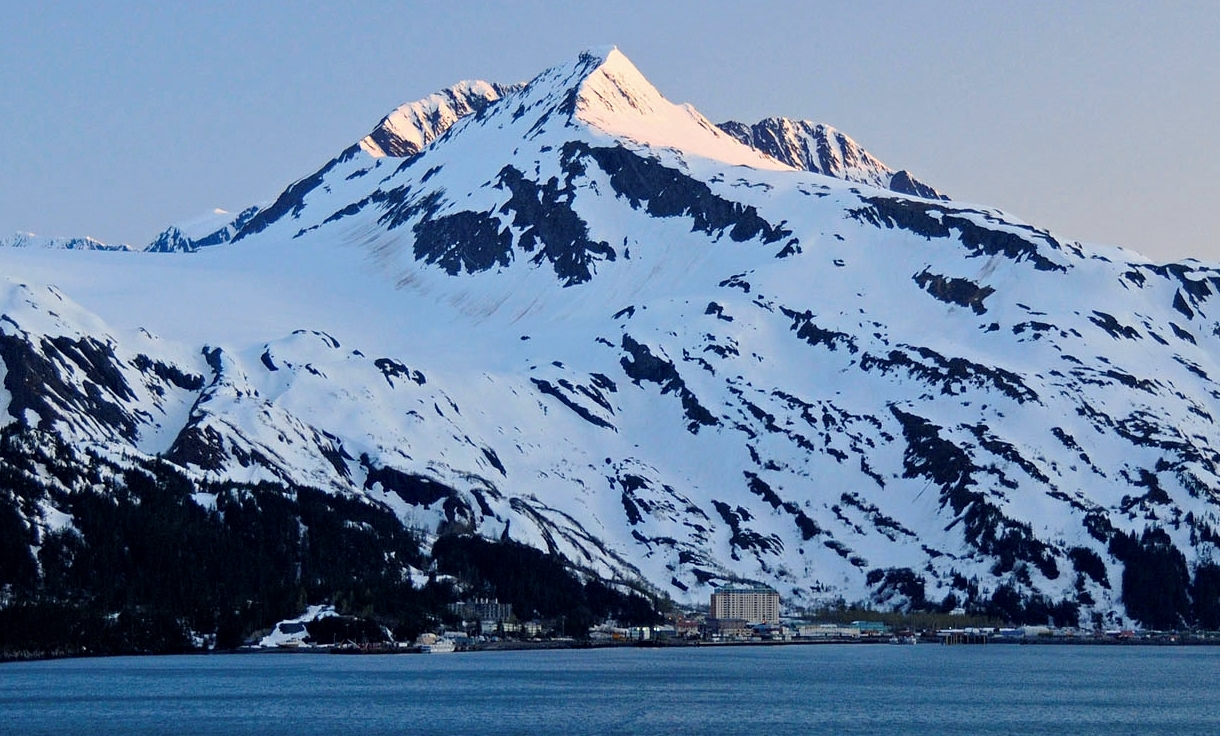
Northeast aspect above Whittier. Bard Peak behind.

== See also ==
- List of mountain peaks of Alaska
- Geography of Alaska
