= Portage Lake (Hubbard County, Minnesota) =

Lake in the state of Minnesota, United States

- Location within Minnesota
- Location: Hubbard County, Minnesota
- Coordinates: 46°57′57″N 95°7′13″W
- Type: lake

Portage Lake is a lake in Hubbard County, in the U.S. state of Minnesota.

Portage Lake was so named from the fact it was on an Ojibwe portage path.

== See also ==
- List of lakes in Minnesota
