= Portage County =

Portage County is the name of two counties in the United States:

- Portage County, Ohio
- Portage County, Wisconsin
