= Portage Lake (Aitkin County, Minnesota) =

Lake in the state of Minnesota, United States

- Location within Minnesota
- Location: Aitkin County, Minnesota
- Coordinates: 46°35′12″N 93°25′15″W
- Type: lake

Portage Lake is a lake in Aitkin County, Minnesota, in the United States.

Portage Lake was so named from the fact that at the lake it was no longer necessary to portage the canoe.

== See also ==
- List of lakes in Minnesota
