= Portage Lake County Park =

Park in Jackson County, Michigan

Coordinates: 42°20′14″N 84°13′38″W

Portage Lake County Park is a park in Waterloo Township, Michigan, United States.

== Facilities ==
A picnic area with grills, a playground, a swimming area, a boat launch, a historic pump house, and portable toilets are available at the 6-acre (2.4 ha) park.
