= Portage Lake (Otter Tail County, Minnesota) =

Lake in the state of Minnesota, United States

- Location within Minnesota
- Location: Otter Tail County, Minnesota
- Coordinates: 46°25′4″N 95°31′50″W
- Type: lake

Portage Lake is a lake in Otter Tail County, in the U.S. state of Minnesota.

Portage Lake was so named from its location on an old canoe portage route.

== See also ==
- List of lakes in Minnesota
