= Bard Peak (Alaska) =

Mountain in Alaska, United States

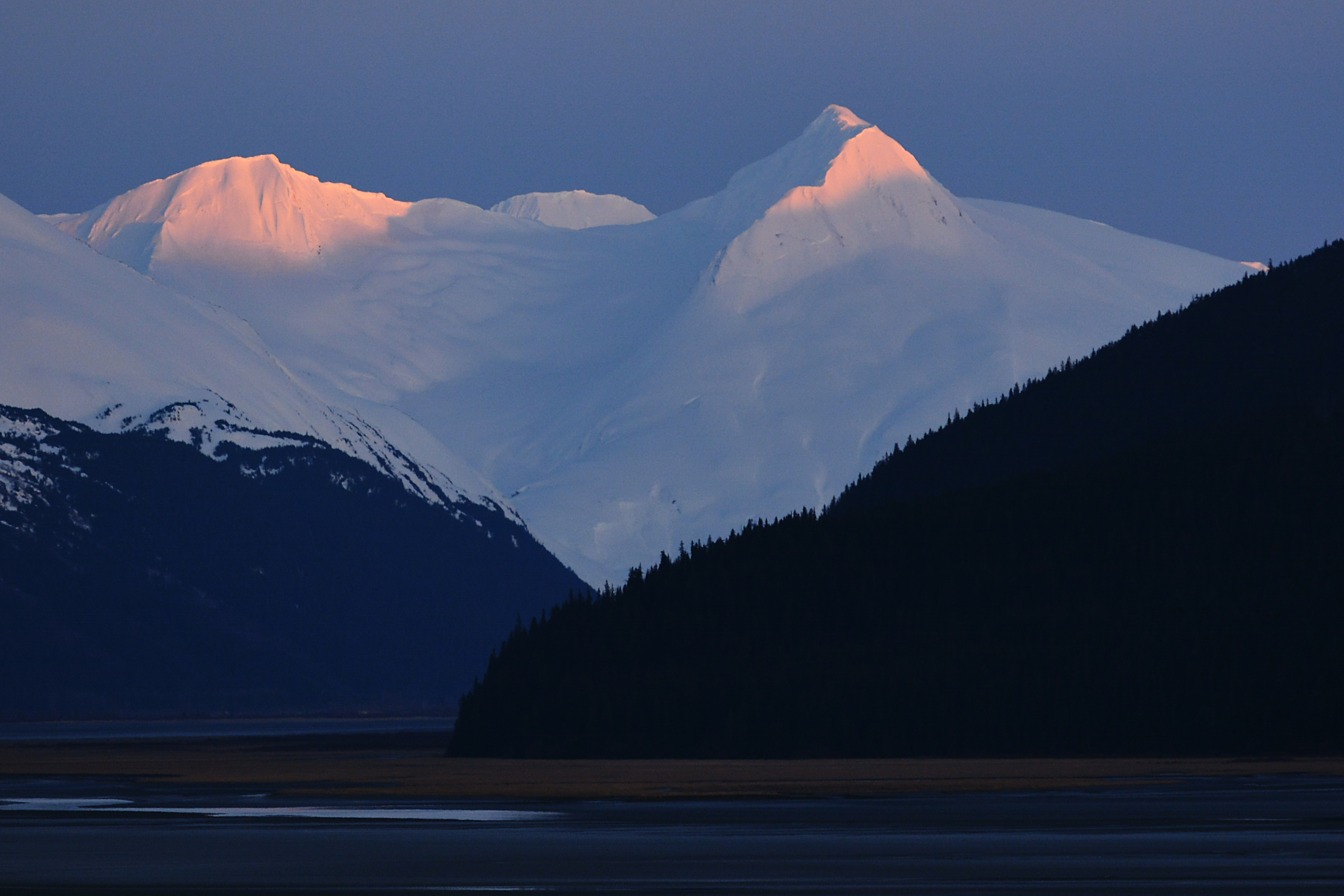
- Bard Peak and Shakespeare Shoulder (left) seen from Turnagain Arm

Highest point
- Elevation: 3,850 ft (1,170 m)
- Prominence: 1,400 ft (430 m)
- Coordinates: 60°44′37″N 148°43′35″W

Geography
- Location within Alaska
- Country: United States
- State: Alaska
- Census Area: Chugach Census Area
- Protected area: Chugach National Forest
- Parent range: Kenai Mountains
- Topo map: USGS Seward C-5

Bard Peak is a 3,850-foot (1,173 m) mountain summit located in the Kenai Mountains, in the U.S. state of Alaska. The peak is situated in Chugach National Forest, 2.5 mi (4 km) southwest of Whittier, Alaska, at the isthmus of the Kenai Peninsula, where the Kenai Mountains meet the Chugach Mountains. Although modest in elevation, relief is significant since the eastern aspect of the mountain rises up from the western sea-level arms of Prince William Sound. Bard Peak is often seen and photographed with Shakespeare Shoulder because they are in the background behind Portage Lake, a popular tourist and recreation destination.

The mountain's name was officially adopted in 1969 by the United States Geological Survey, although it was misspelled Baird on their map. The peak's name honors bards Robert Burns, The Bard of Ayrshire, and William Shakespeare, known as The Bard of Avon, (or in England, simply The Bard).

== Climate ==
Based on the Köppen climate classification, Bard Peak is located in a subarctic climate zone with long, cold, snowy winters, and mild summers. Temperatures can drop below −20 °C with wind chill factors below −30 °C. This climate supports the Shakespeare Glacier on the northern slopes of the mountain, the Burns Glacier on the south side, Portage Glacier to the west, and the massive Whittier Glacier (named for John Greenleaf Whittier) on its eastern aspect. May and June are the best months for climbing in terms of favorable weather.

== Gallery ==
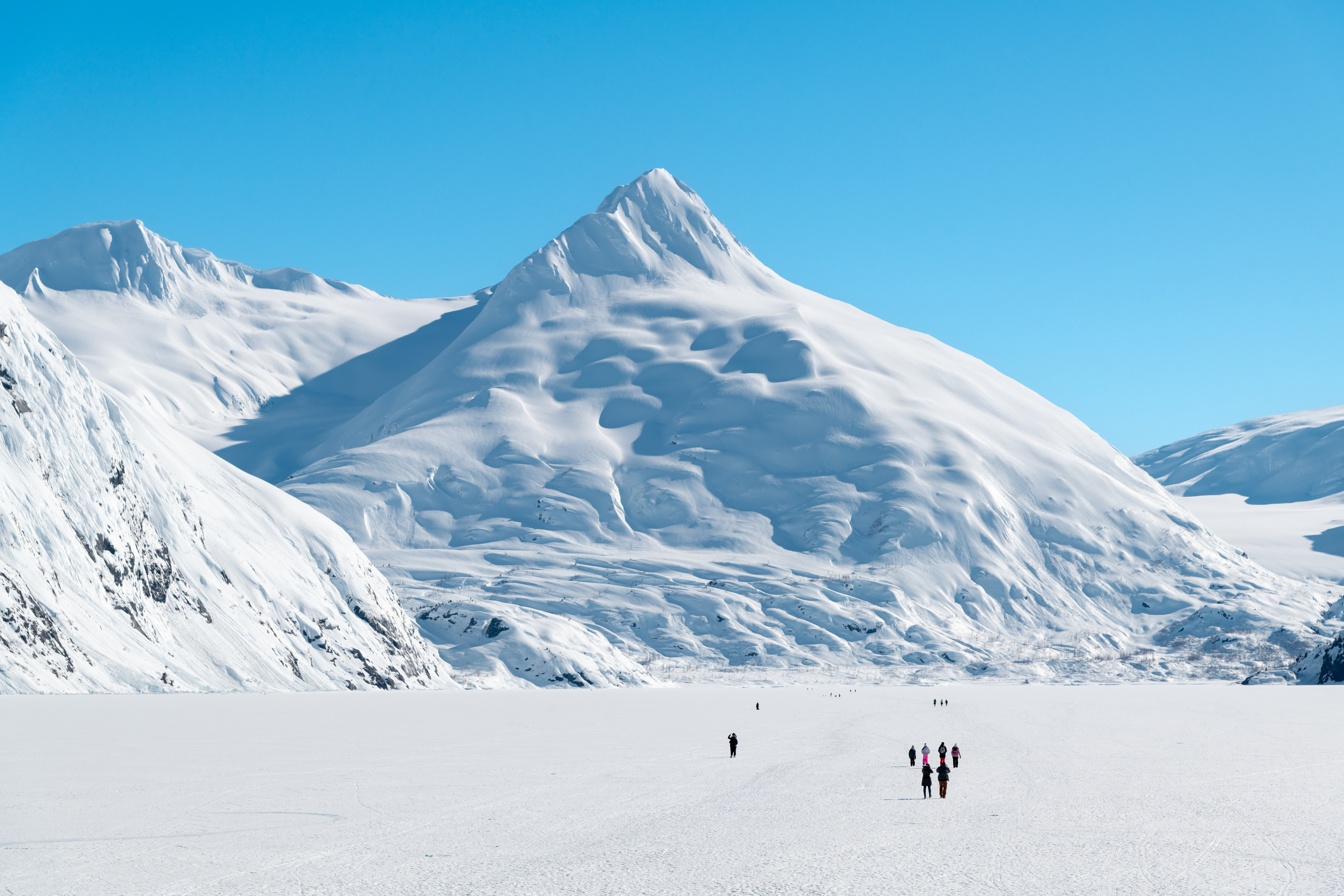
Bard Peak in winter

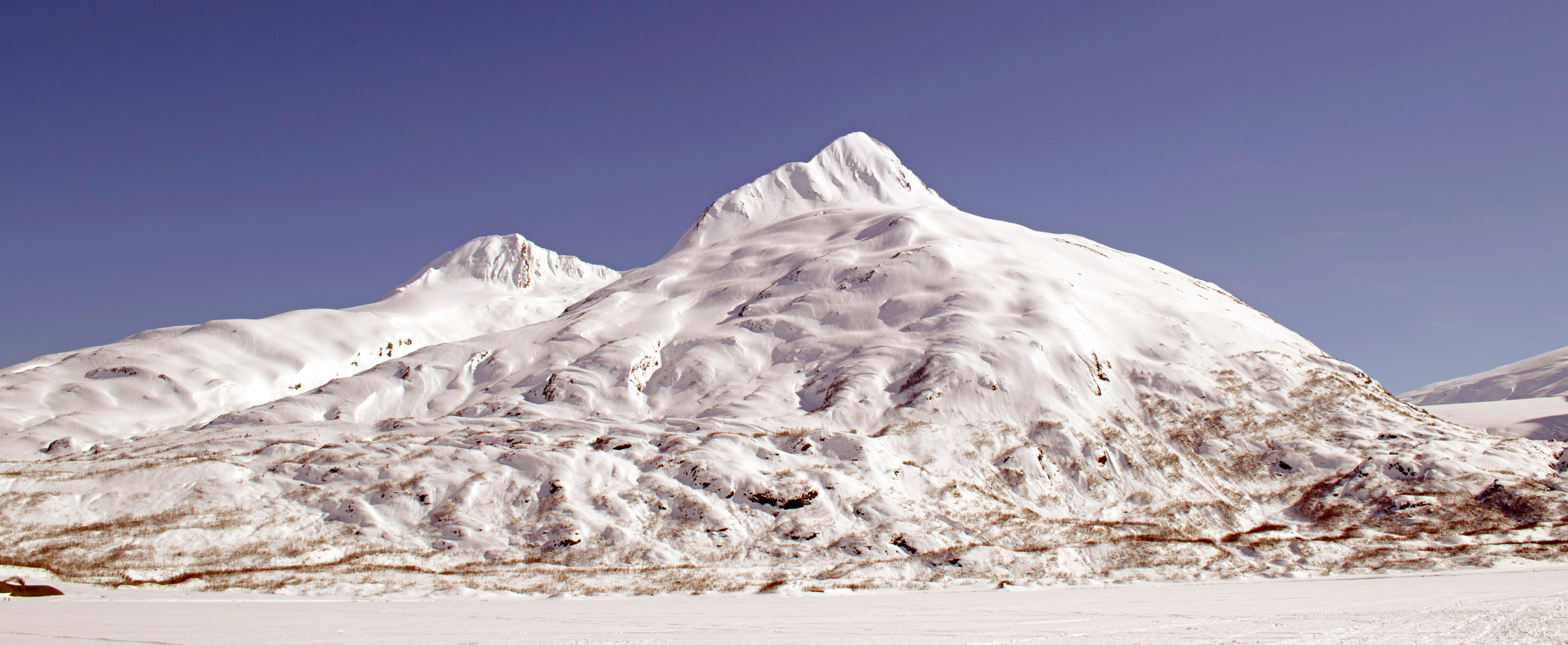
Bard Peak (Shakespeare Shoulder to left)

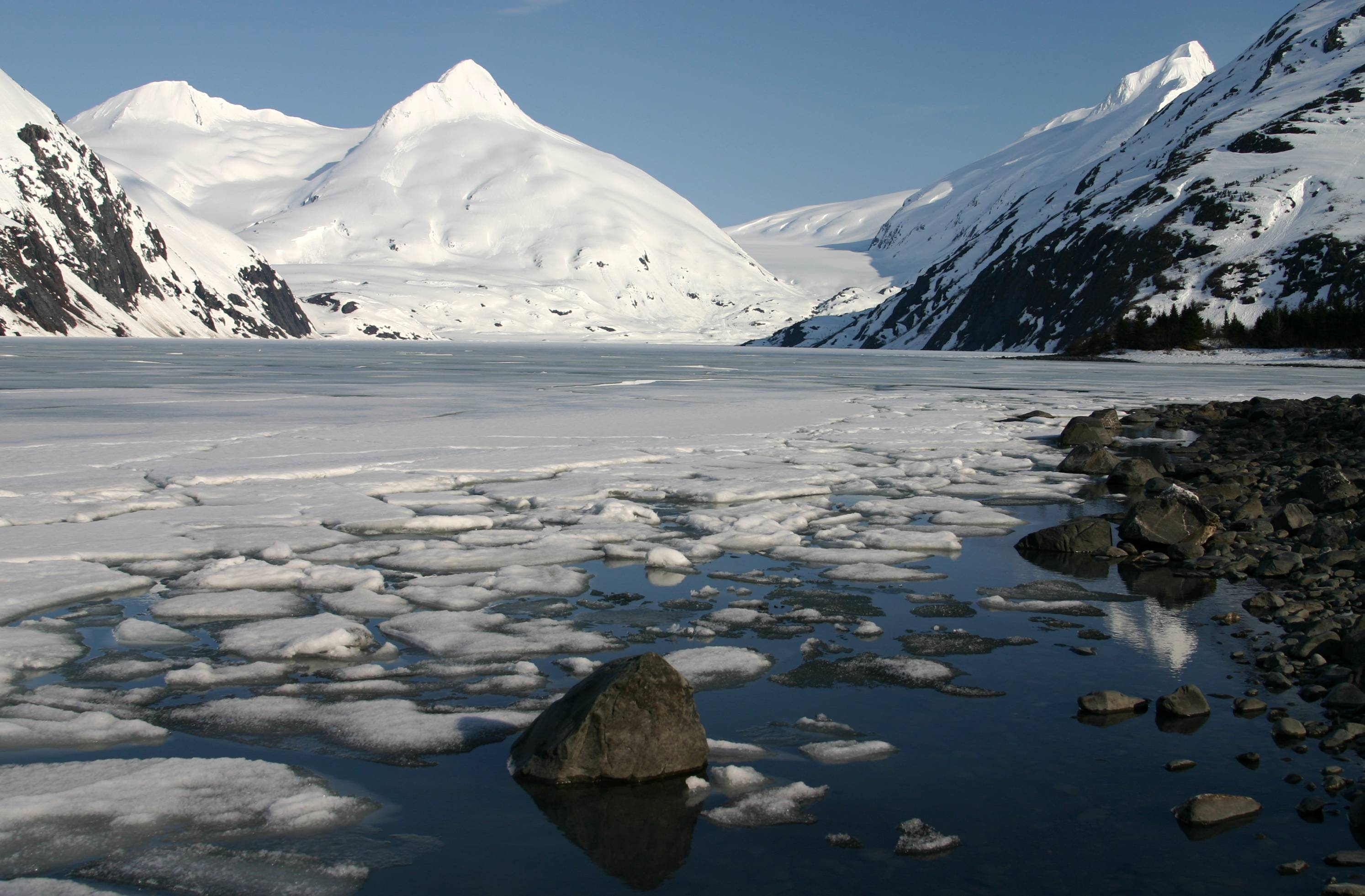
Looking across Portage Lake toward Bard Peak (left)

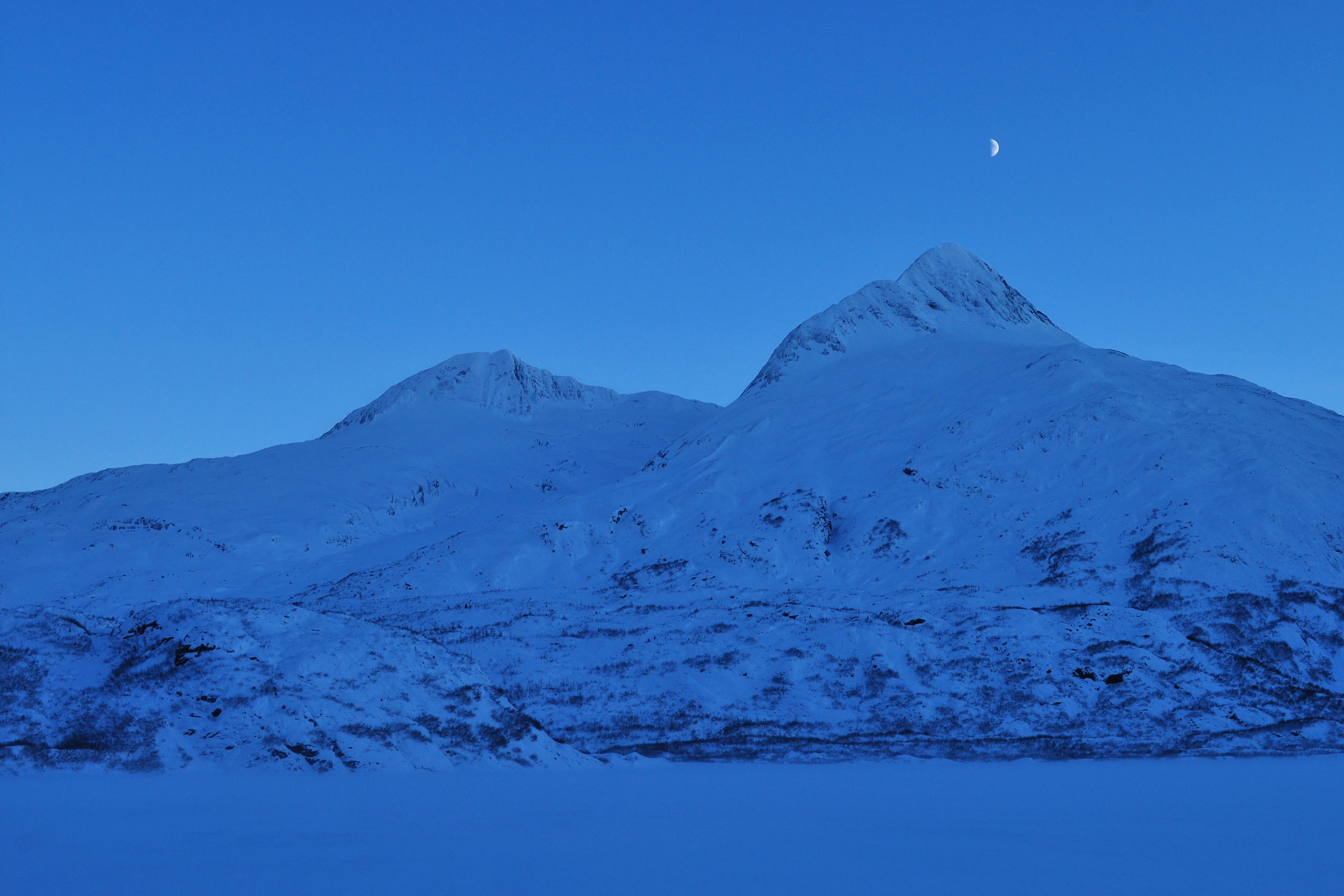
Bard Peak

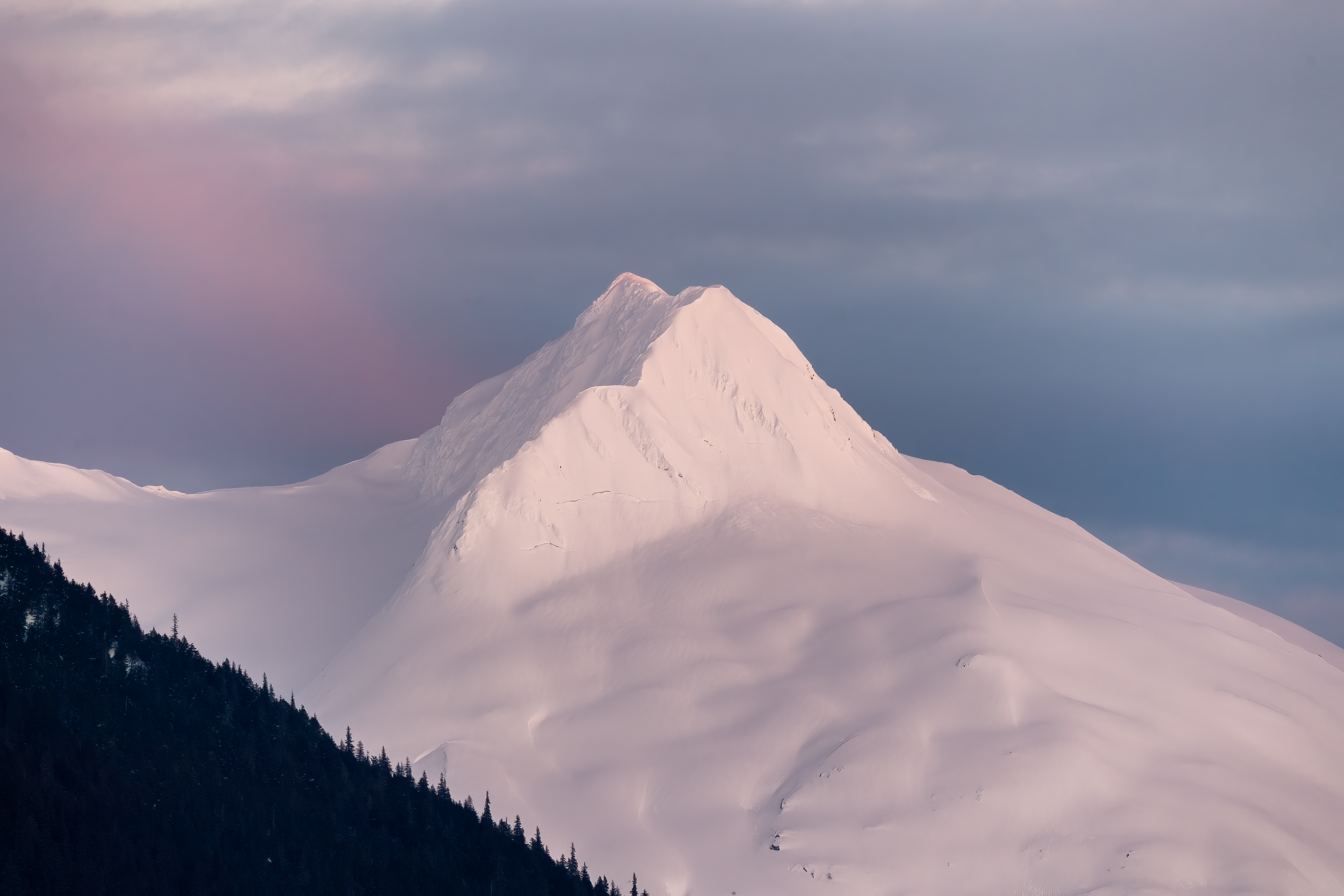
Bard Peak

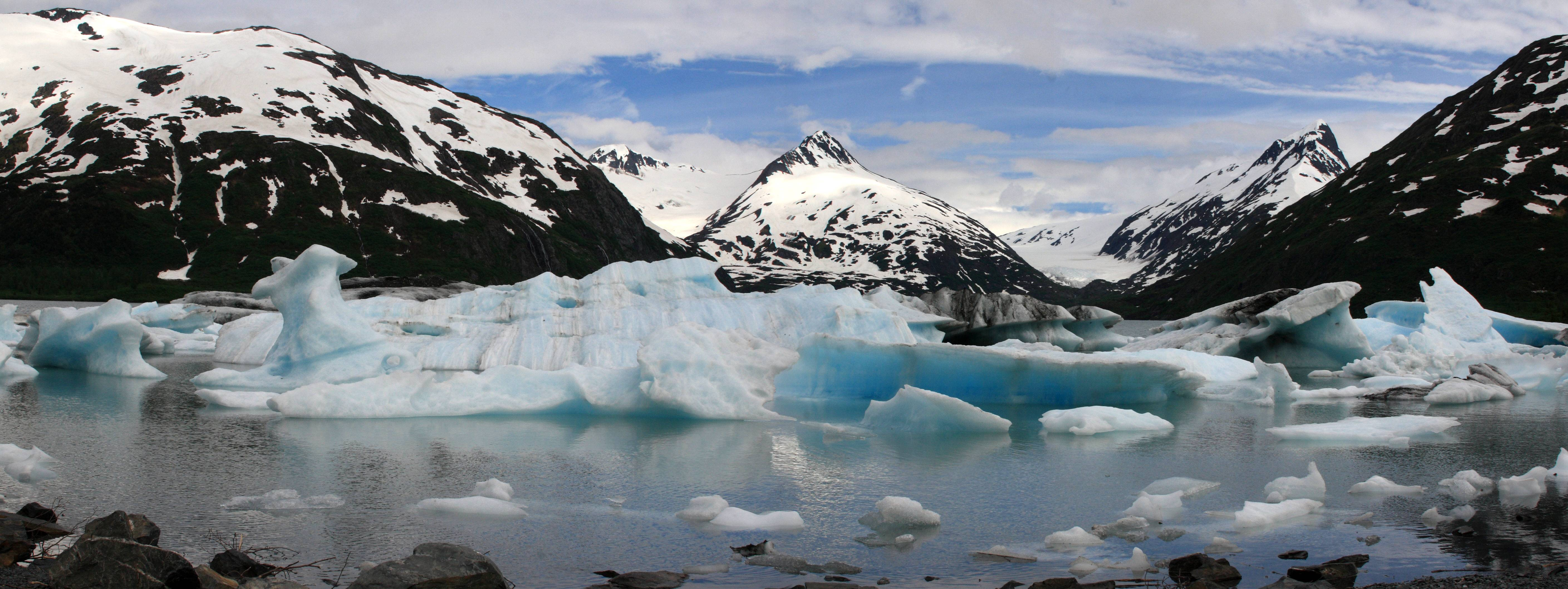
Bard Peak centered

== See also ==
- List of mountain peaks of Alaska
- Geography of Alaska
