= Portage, Anchorage, Alaska =

Ghost town in Alaska

Coordinates: 60.837°N 148.985°W

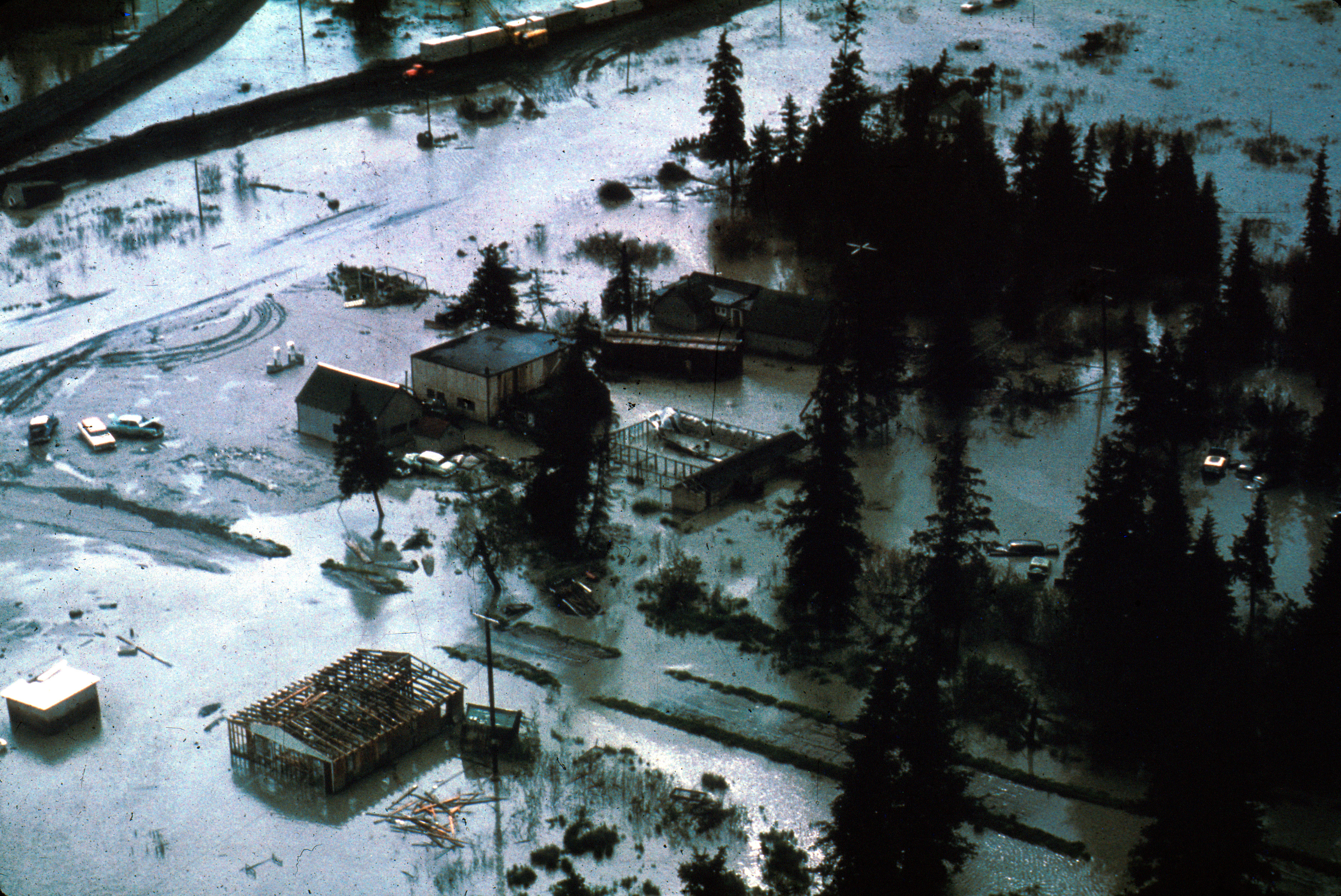
Portage just after the earthquake, the destruction and flooding clearly visible

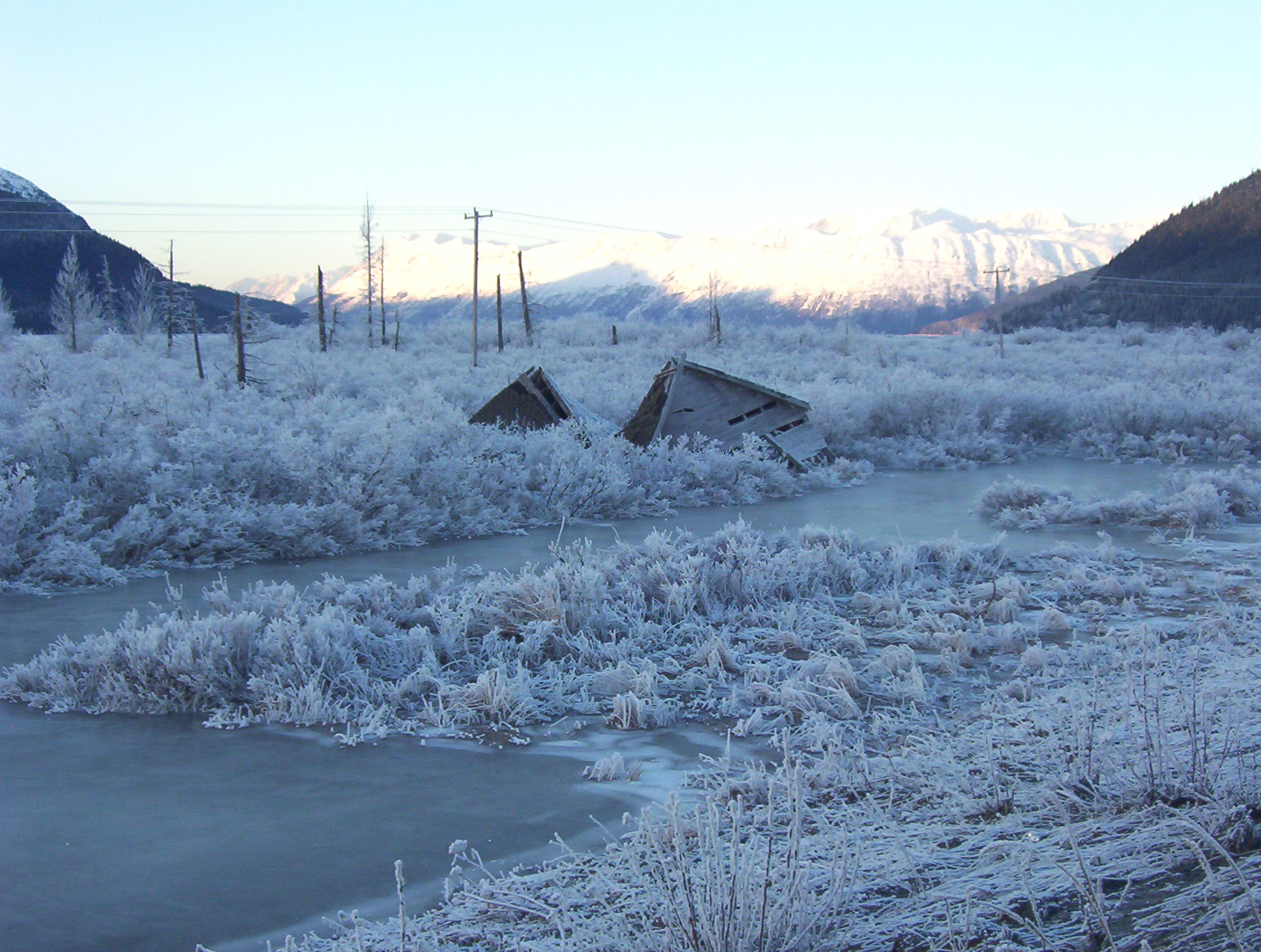
A ruined building and a stand of dead spruce trees preserved by saltwater are all that remains of Portage today

Portage is a ghost town and former settlement on Turnagain Arm in Alaska, about 47 miles (76 km) southeast of Downtown Anchorage. The town was destroyed in the 1964 Alaska earthquake when the ground in the area sank about six feet (1.8 m), putting most of the town below high tide level. All that remains today are the ruins of a few buildings and a "ghost forest" of trees that died after salt water inundated their root systems. Where there was once a town there is now only a railroad and road junction linking the Seward Highway and the Alaska Railroad to Portage Glacier park and the Anton Anderson Memorial Tunnel, which leads to Whittier.

Popular recreational activities in the Portage area include visiting the wildlife center, floating Portage, Twentymile, Placer rivers, fishing for hooligan in the Twentymile river, and ice skating the numerous marshy areas, creeks, and Portage Lake.

== Demographics ==
Historical population
Census	Pop.	Note	%±
1950	34		—
1960	71		108.8%
U.S. Decennial Census

Portage first appeared on the 1950 United States Census as an unincorporated village. It returned again in 1960. The townsite was annexed by Anchorage when it merged with its borough in 1975.
