= Portage Glacier =

Glacier in Alaska, United States

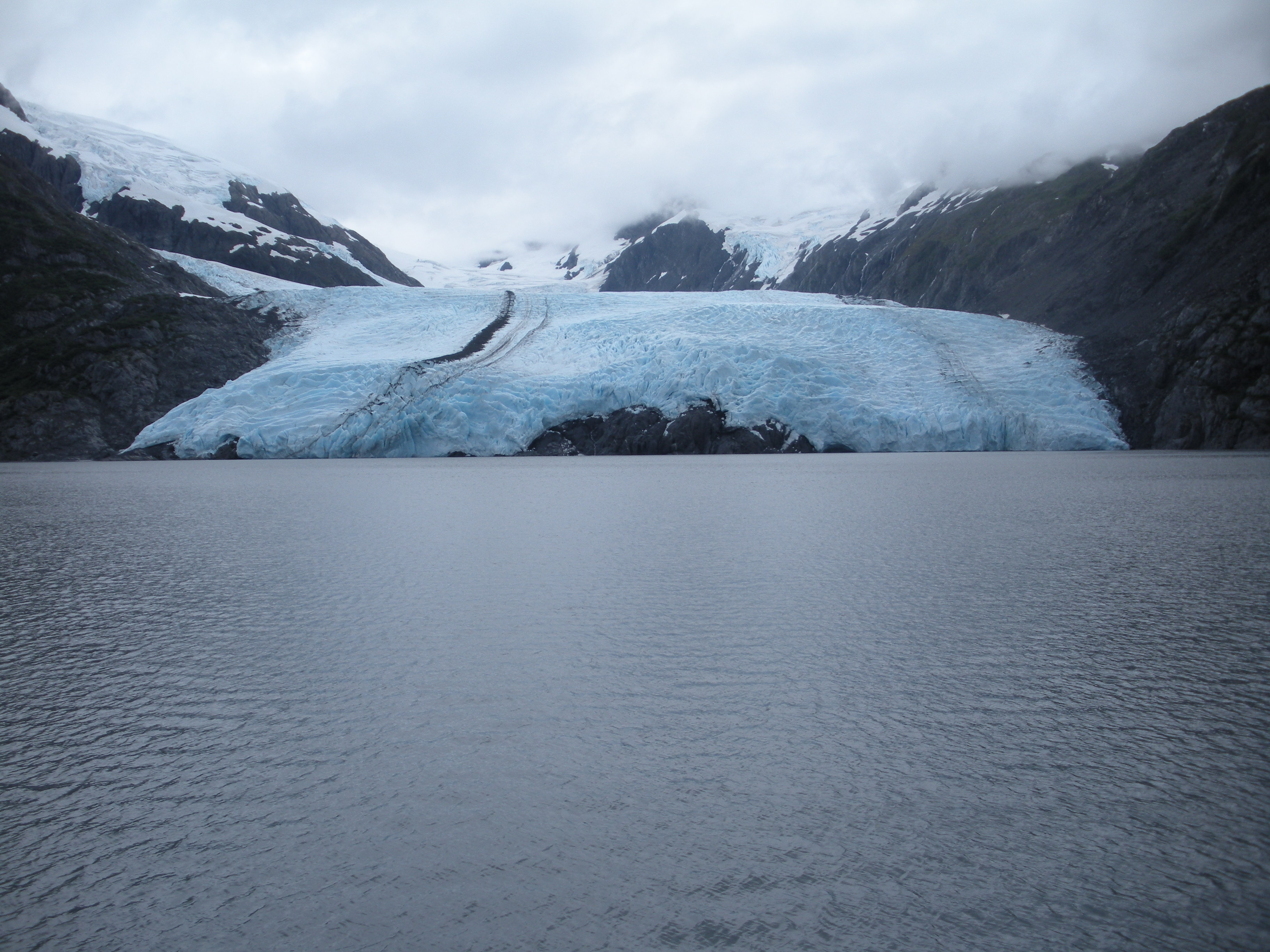
- Portage Glacier in 2009

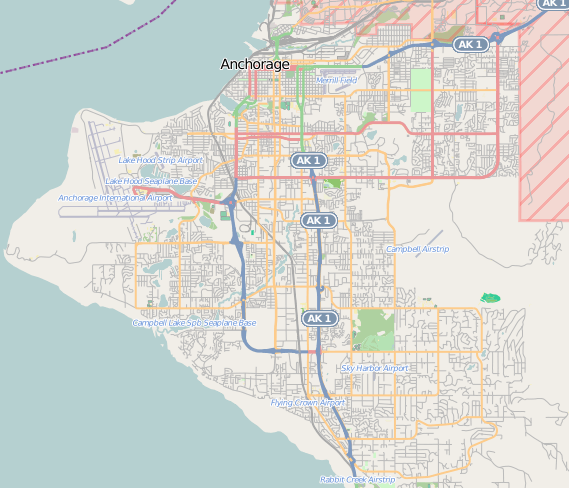
- Location within Anchorage Location within Alaska
- Interactive map of Portage Glacier
- Type: Mountain glacier
- Location: Anchorage and Kenai Peninsula Borough, Alaska, U.S.
- Coordinates: 60°45′11″N 148°47′08″W
- Length: 6 m (20 ft)
- Terminus: glacial lake
- Status: retreating

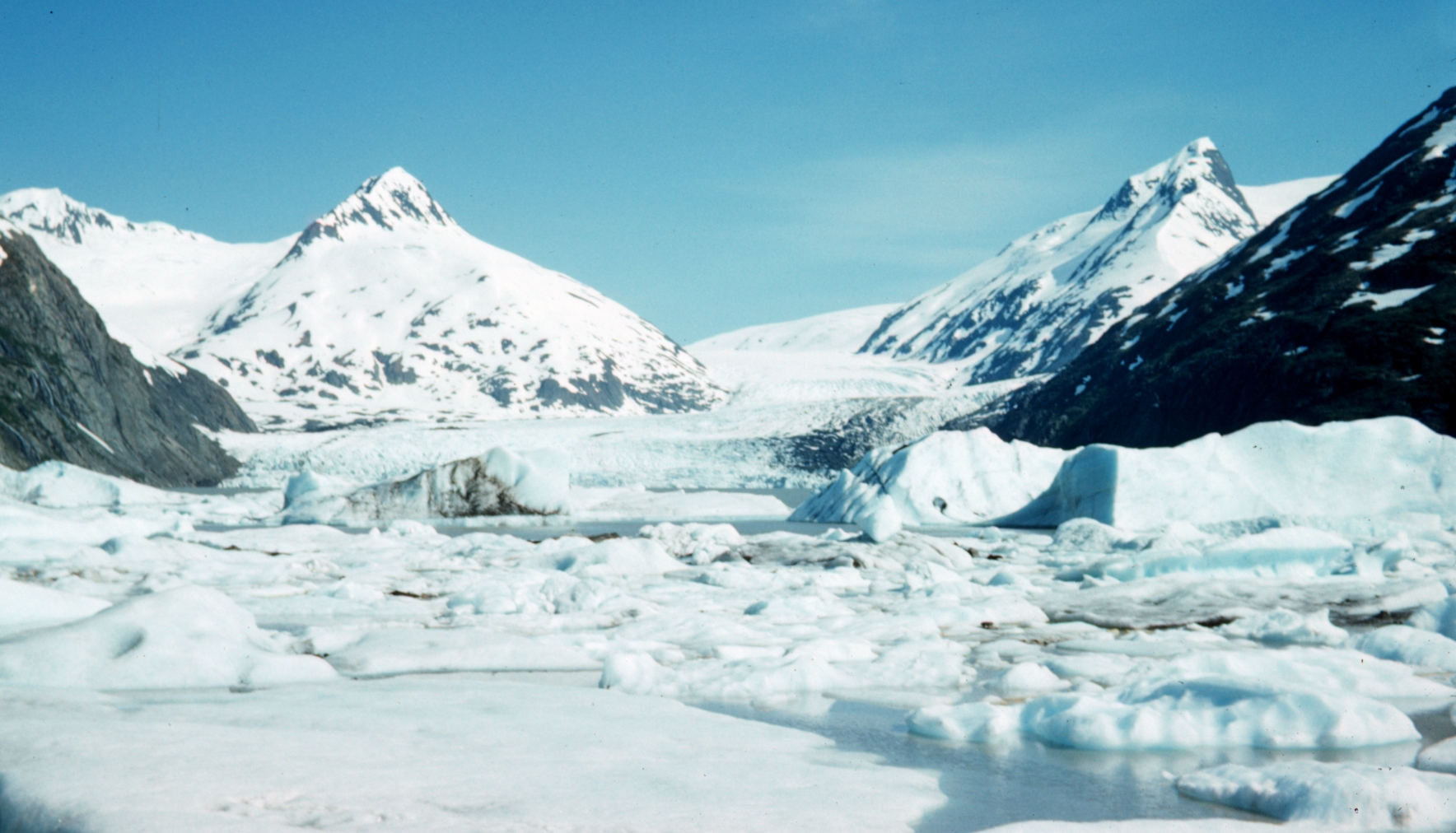
Portage Glacier has retreated substantially since this image was taken in 1958 (Bard Peak to left)

Portage Glacier (Note: Dena'ina: Tutl’uh Yun’e Łi, trans. "Glacier Upriver from Backwater") is a glacier on the Kenai Peninsula of the U.S. state of Alaska and is included within the Chugach National Forest. It is located south of Portage Lake and 6 km (4 mi) west of Whittier.

Portage Glacier was a local name first recorded in 1898 by Thomas Corwin Mendenhall of the United States Coast and Geodetic Survey, so called because it is on a portage route between Prince William Sound and Turnagain Arm. Hundreds of years ago the glacier filled the entire Portage Valley, a distance of 14 miles (23 km), and was connected to what are now five separate glaciers.

The Begich/Boggs Visitor Center (located here 60°47′05″N 148°50′29″W) was built by the U.S. Forest Service in 1986. However, the glacier can no longer be viewed from there. In the summer a boat ride across the lake is required to view the glacier. Commercial boat tours are available. In the winter the glacier sees much foot, bike, and ski traffic if the lake freezes.

== Geography ==
Portage Glacier is located adjacent to Turnagain Arm, 50 miles southeast of downtown Anchorage. Road access is via the Seward Highway to the former town of Portage, which was flooded and subsequently vacated following the 1964 Alaska earthquake. The Portage Glacier Road runs 6 miles (9.7 km), mostly past USFS campgrounds, to the Begich, Boggs Visitor Center. The main road used to end here, but now continues eastward, leading to the Anton Anderson Memorial Tunnel and to Whittier.

== See also ==
- List of glaciers
