= Portage Township =

Portage Township may refer to:

== Indiana ==
- Portage Township, Porter County, Indiana
- Portage Township, St. Joseph County, Indiana

== Michigan ==
- Portage Charter Township, Michigan, in Houghton County
- Portage Township, Kalamazoo County, Michigan, now the city of Portage
- Portage Township, Mackinac County, Michigan

== Minnesota ==
- Portage Township, St. Louis County, Minnesota

== Missouri ==
- Portage Township, New Madrid County, Missouri

== Ohio ==
- Portage Township, Hancock County, Ohio
- Portage Township, Ottawa County, Ohio
- Portage Township, Summit County, Ohio, defunct
- Portage Township, Wood County, Ohio

== Pennsylvania ==
- Portage Township, Cambria County, Pennsylvania
- Portage Township, Cameron County, Pennsylvania
- Portage Township, Potter County, Pennsylvania

== South Dakota ==
- Portage Township, Brown County, South Dakota, in Brown County, South Dakota
