= Portage Lake (Alaska) =

Lake in the state of Alaska, United States

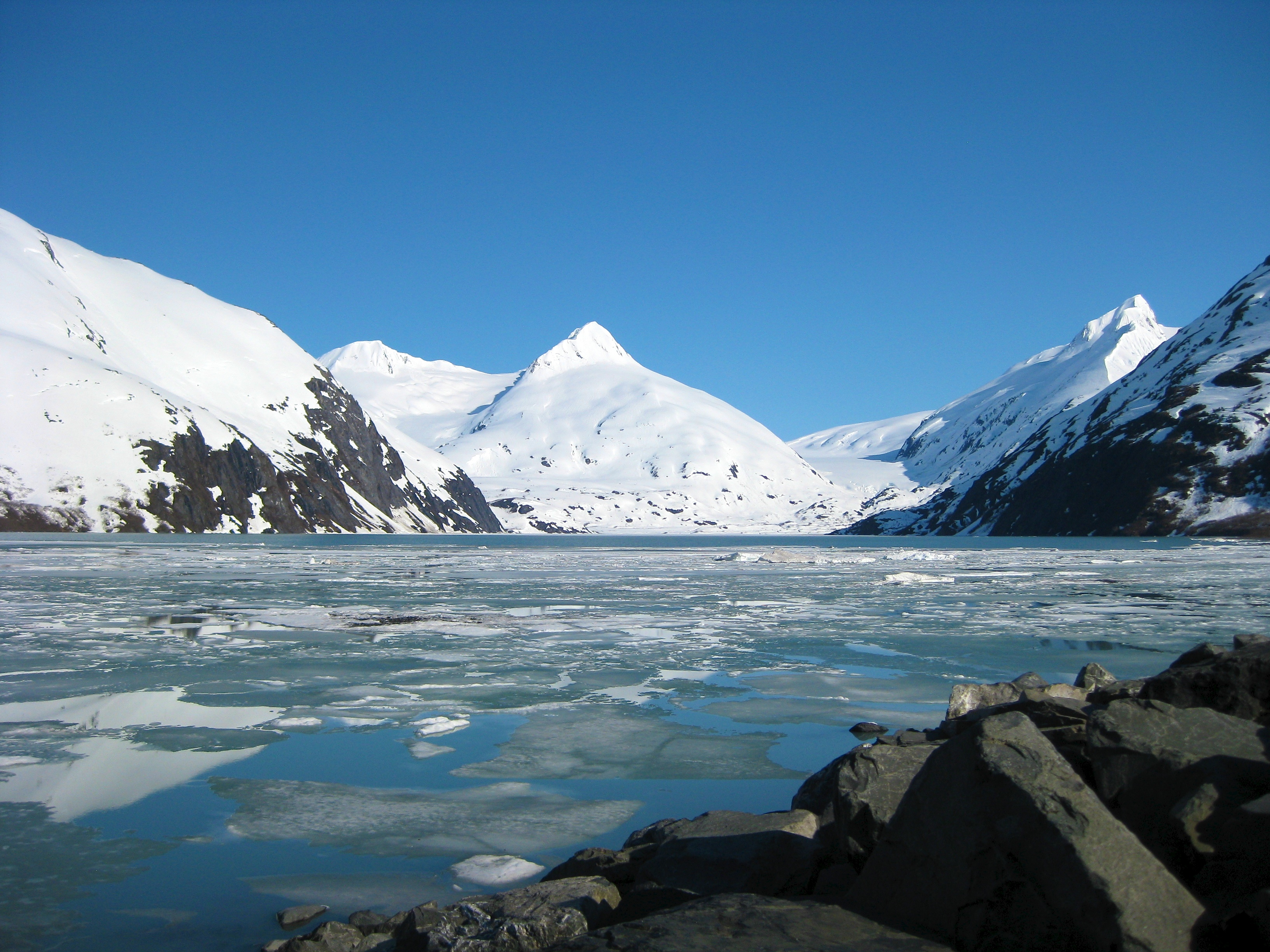
- Portage Lake, as seen from the Western edge near the Begich Boggs Visitor Center with Bard Peak in the distance

- Location within Alaska Location within North America
- Location: Chugach National Forest, Alaska, United States
- Coordinates: 60°46′27″N 148°49′0″W
- Primary inflows: Placer Creek, Mallott Creek
- Primary outflows: Portage Creek
- Basin countries: United States
- Max. length: 3.0 mi (4.8 km)
- Max. width: .89 mi (1.43 km)
- Average depth: 600 ft (180 m)
- Islands: none

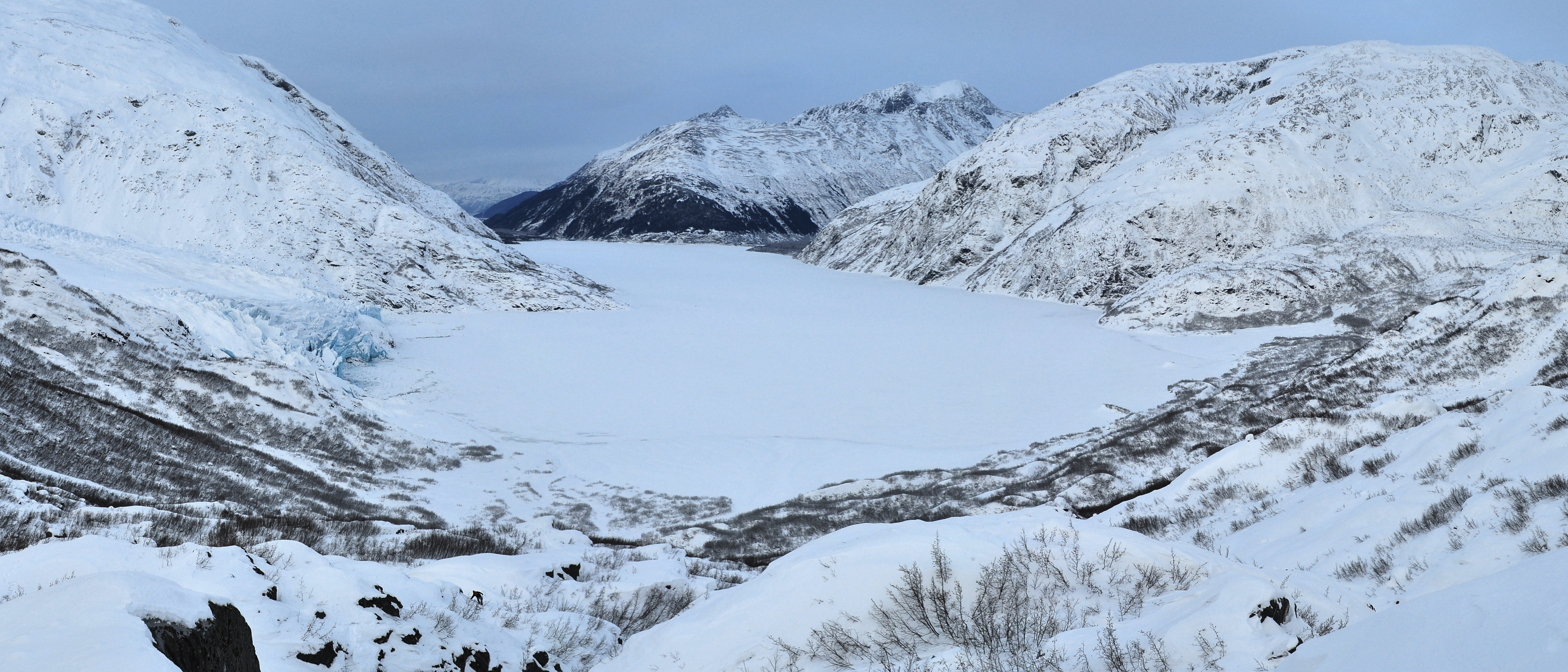
Portage Lake as viewed from near the terminus of Burns Glacier. Portage Glacier is visible on the left.

Portage Lake is a glacial lake in the Chugach National Forest of the U.S. state of Alaska. It sits in a long, heavily glaciated valley, and abuts the calving face of Portage Glacier at its southern end. The lake has only become visible since approximately 1914, with the rapid retreat of Portage Glacier.

== Access and recreation ==
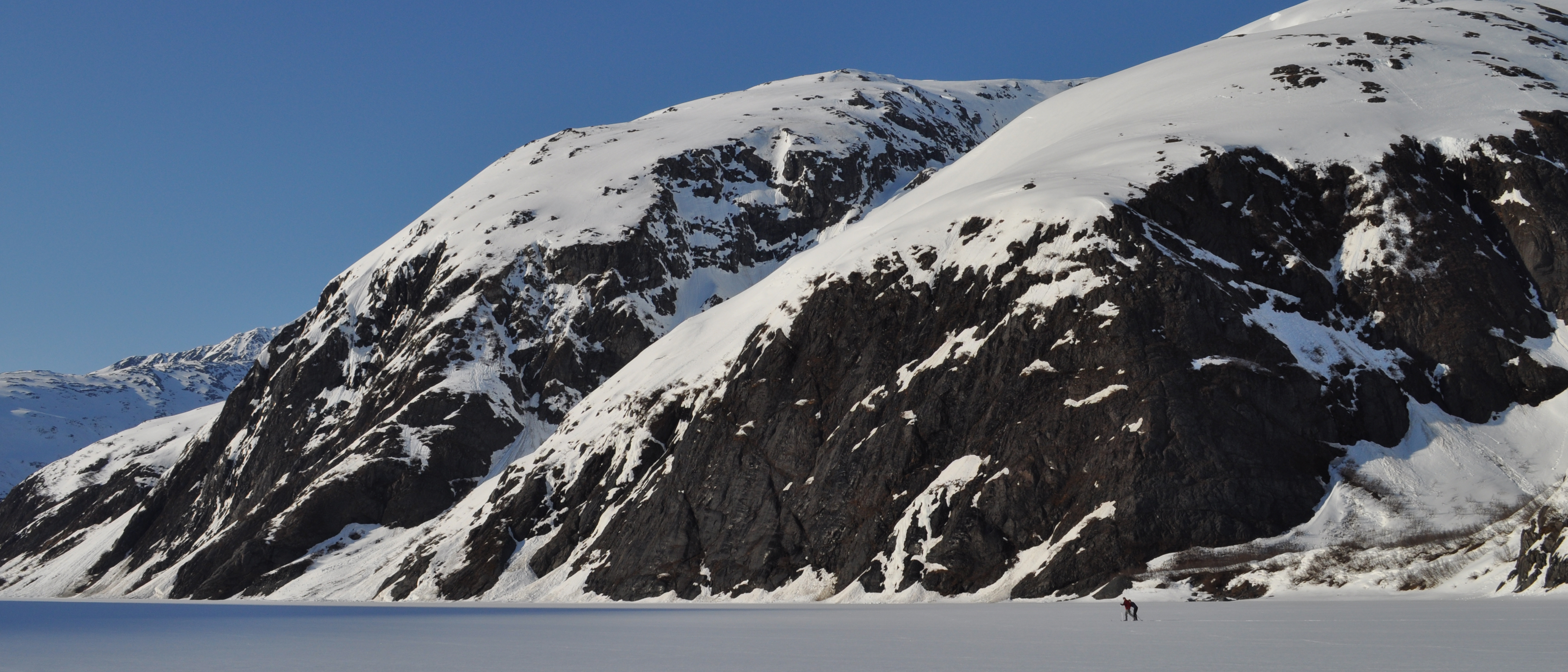
Cross-country skiers enjoy the spring "crust" skiing on Portage Lake

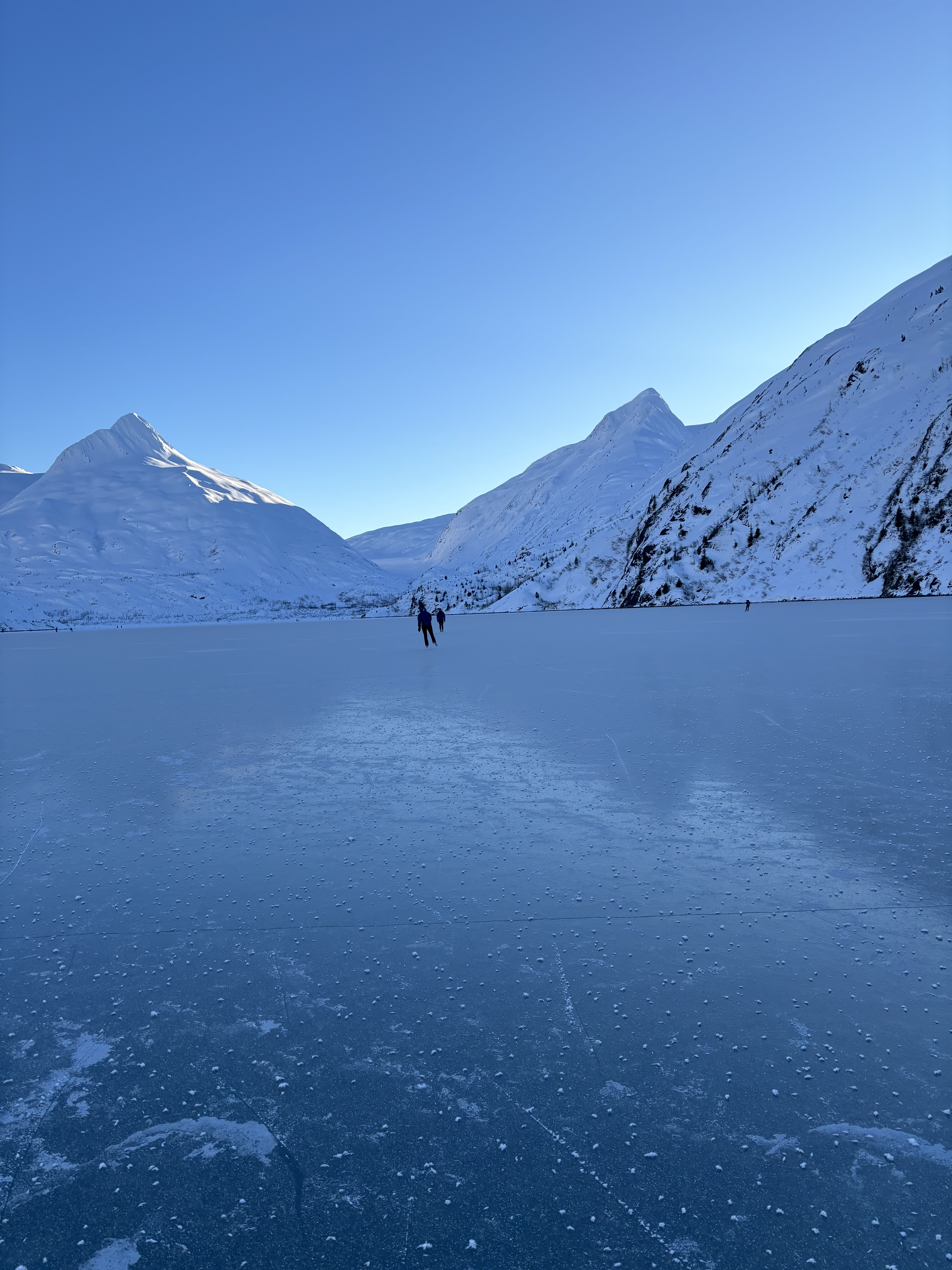
Ice skaters recreate on Portage Lake

The western shore of Portage Lake is easily accessed via a large parking lot at the lakeside Begich, Boggs Visitor Center, just off the Portage Glacier Highway. (The Center was named after Congressmen Nick Begich and Hale Boggs, who were killed in a 1972 plane crash.) Portage Glacier Cruises operates a short glacier cruise, which takes visitors near the face of the glacier. Recreational boating in the lake was illegal in the past, due to rolling icebergs and the calving face of Portage Glacier at the far end of the lake, but is now legal. However, proper precautions must be taken for the challenging conditions. During winter and spring, the lake is a popular destination for cross-country skiing, kite skiing, mountain biking, skating, snowshoe running, and hiking. Skiers especially prize the "crust skiing" of mid-spring. Skiers must take appropriate precautions near Portage Glacier, as the constant movement of the glacier's calving face breaks up even thick lake ice and can create patches of open water or unstable ice near the glacier's face, even in midwinter.

== Fatalities and incidents ==
Its low temperature year-round makes Portage Lake a potentially dangerous locale for swimming or other water activities.

- July 2012. Utah resident Levi Matheson Taylor saved an Anchorage resident from drowning after he attempted to swim 75 feet (23 m) to a gravel bar.
- October 2012. One man dead after attempting to retrieve a canoe.
