= Palmer Creek (Turnagain Arm) =

Coordinates: 60.8544°N 149.6311°W

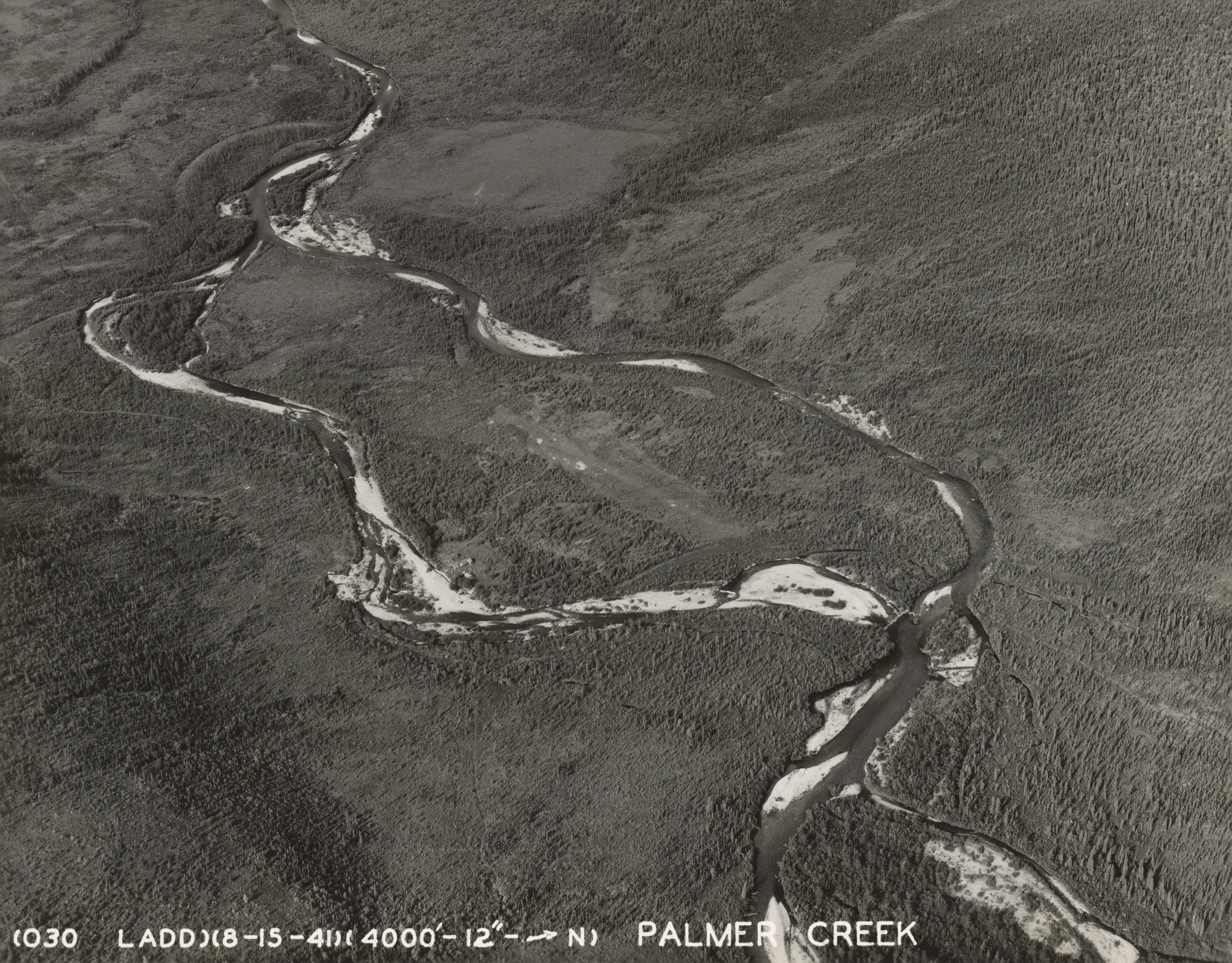
Airstrip at Palmer Creek, 1942

Palmer Creek is a waterway in the Kenai Peninsula, Alaska, US. It is an affluent of Resurrection Creek, itself a tributary of Turnagain Arm.

== Geography ==
Palmer Creek flows northwest for 11 miles (18 km) before reaching Resurrection Creek. Hope is located 4.5 miles (7.2 km) to the north. Its upper portion flows for 6 miles (9.7 km) through a broad, round-bottomed valley, while its lower part occupies a steep, narrow canyon rut through rock in some places and through gravel benches in others. Mining has been carried on chiefly in the lower 1.5 miles (2.4 km) of the stream and has been confined entirely to the channel gravels. The country rock includes interbedded slates and arkoses, whose cleavage strikes a little east of north and dips at a high angle. The arkoses are frequently very much jointed and in weathering do not break into small pieces as easily as do the slates, a fact readily seen on examining tho stream wash. The gravels resemble the country rock in their composition, and were undoubtedly derived from it in large part, although there are a few granitic bowlders which may not be of local origin. There is a large proportion of angular fragments and no small percentage of coarse material, possibly 5 percent being over 1.5 feet (0.46 m) in diameter. At the surface, the gravels were laid down without definite arrangement but are rudely stratified below. Palmer Creek gold is coarse and heavy, flattened, and smooth. In color, it is bright yellow or whitish. Pieces of native silver have been noted.

== History ==
Gold was found on Palmer Creek in 1894 by George Palmer, a trader in the Knik Arm area in the late 1800s. These discoveries led to prospecting on neighboring streams, and in the following year (1895) the first stakes were driven on Mills Creek by S. J. Mills, whose name it bears, and at the forks of Sixmile Creek, also named by Mills. The gold claims on this stream were originally held by single individuals. Two hydraulic plants were at work in 1904, employing approximately 10 men. By 1915, the whole of the lower canyon portion, 18 claims, was controlled by one company. In 1915, it was reported that most of the prospects on Palmer Creek were on a mineralized acidic dike. The dike was first discovered in 1898 on Coeur d'Alene Gulch by an Australian outfit, but no development work was done. Later, John Hirshey and Elmer Carlson located the dike in Ptarmigan Gulch about a mile south of the original discovery and W. A. Logman relocated the dike on Coeur d'Aleno Gulch. The Lucky Strike mine, managed by John Hirshey, reported activity in 1931.
