= Hope Historic District (Hope, Alaska) =

Historic district in Alaska, United States

- U.S. National Register of Historic Places
- U.S. Historic district
- Alaska Heritage Resources Survey
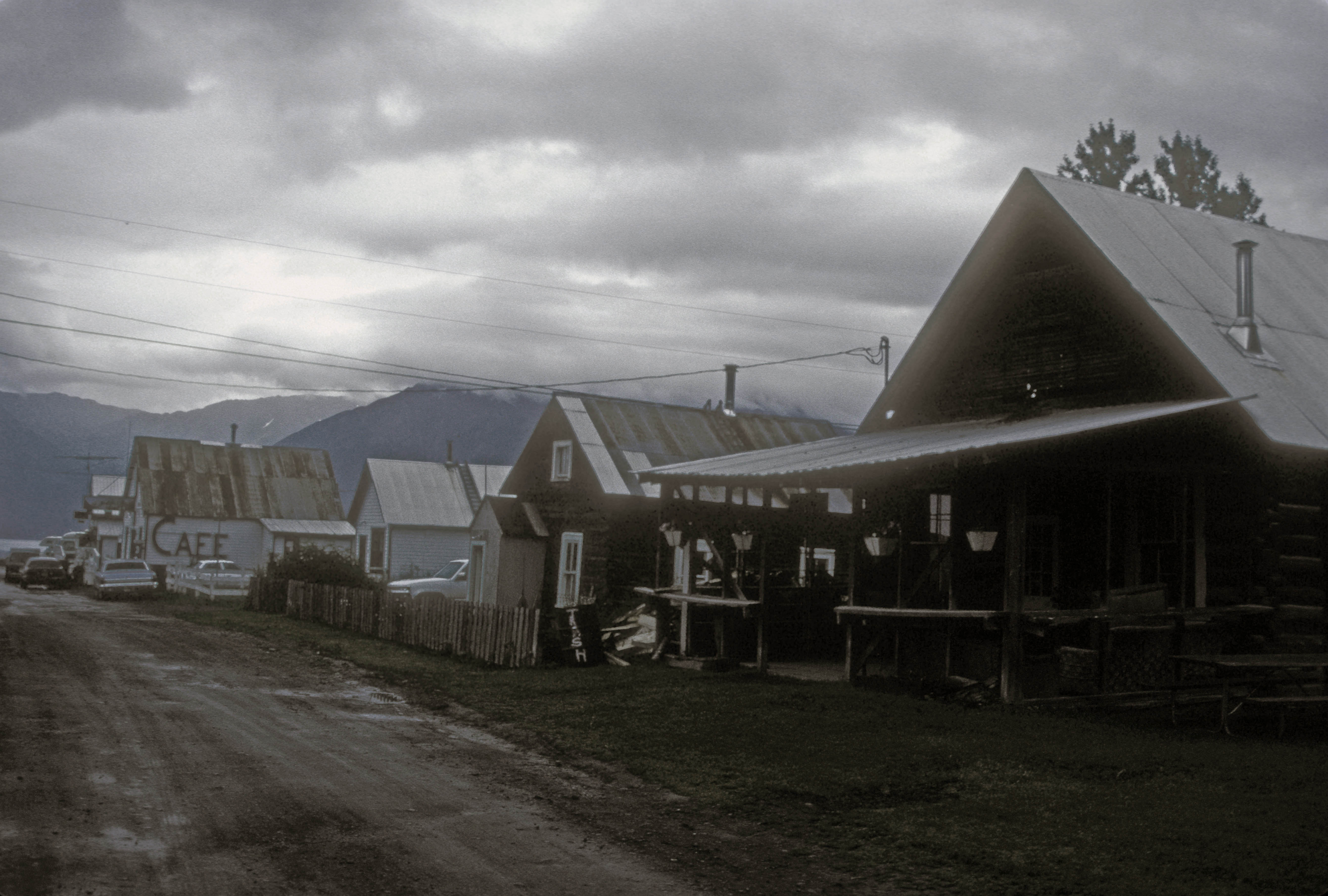

- Location within Alaska
- Location: Mile 17 (km 27) Hope Road in Hope, Alaska
- Area: 15 acres (6.1 ha)
- Built: 1896
- NRHP reference No.: 72001583
- AHRS No.: SEW-018
- Added to NRHP: April 25, 1972

The Hope Historic District encompasses the surviving elements of the former mining boom town of Hope, Alaska. Hope is located in the northeastern corner of the Kenai Peninsula, alongside the spot where Resurrection Creek empties into the Turnagain Arm of Cook Inlet. Principal access to Hope is via the Hope Highway, a side road of the Seward Highway. Its historic center is formed by a grid of streets with Main Street at the west and Fifth Street at the east, A Street at the south, and formerly C Street at the north. The C Street area and parts of B Street are now submerged at high tide; the remaining historic buildings are located on Main, A and B streets, and First and Second streets. It includes 29 historic buildings, dating from the turn of the 20th century to the 1940s. The community was established in 1898 to support gold mining operations in the mountainous interior of the Kenai Peninsula, activity that largely ended in the 1940s. Because the town was isolated, as the Seward Highway wasn't completed until 1951, a significant concentration of its early buildings survive.

The district was listed on the National Register of Historic Places in 1972.

== See also ==
- National Register of Historic Places listings in Kenai Peninsula Borough, Alaska
