= Boggs Peak =

Mountain in Alaska, United States

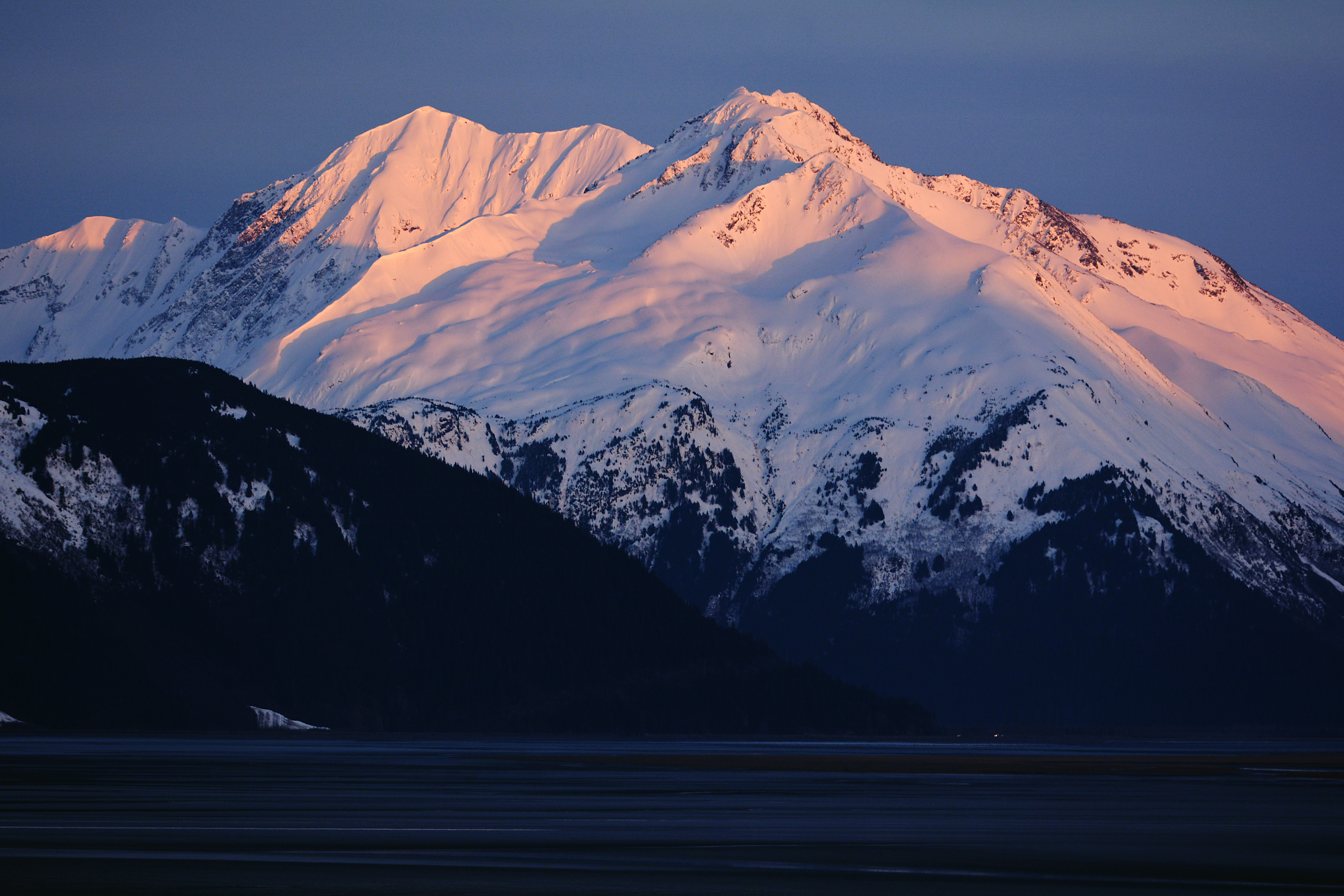

Highest point
- Elevation: 4,518 ft (1,377 m)
- Prominence: 1,030 ft (310 m)
- Parent peak: Begich Peak
- Isolation: 1.25 mi (2.01 km)
- Coordinates: 60°50′15″N 148°48′28″W

Geography
- Location within Alaska
- Interactive map of Boggs Peak
- Location: Municipality of Anchorage
- Country: United States
- State: Alaska
- Protected area: Chugach National Forest
- Parent range: Chugach Mountains
- Topo map: USGS Seward D-5

Boggs Peak is a 4,518-foot (1,377 m) mountain summit located in the Chugach Mountains, in Anchorage Municipality in the U.S. state of Alaska. The peak is situated in Chugach National Forest, 4 mi (6 km) north of Portage Lake, 6 mi (10 km) northwest of Whittier, Alaska, and 1.24 mi (2 km) northeast of Begich Peak, which is its nearest higher peak. Precipitation runoff from the mountain drains into tributaries of Portage Creek and Twentymile River before emptying into Turnagain Arm. Topographic relief is significant as the summit rises approximately 4,200 feet (1,280 m) above Bear Valley in 1.15 miles (1.85 km).

== Etymology ==
The mountain's toponym was officially adopted in 1976 by the United States Board on Geographic Names to commemorate Hale Boggs (1914–1972), who was the House majority leader of the U.S. House of Representatives when he disappeared along with Congressman Nick Begich and two others on October 16, 1972, during an airplane flight from Anchorage to Juneau. Neither the plane's wreckage nor the pilot's and passengers' remains were ever found.

== Climate ==
Based on the Köppen climate classification, Boggs Peak is located in a subarctic climate zone with cold, snowy winters, and mild summers. Weather systems coming off the Gulf of Alaska are forced upwards by the Chugach Mountains (orographic lift), causing heavy precipitation in the form of rainfall and snowfall. Winter temperatures can drop below −10 °F with wind chill factors below −20 °F. The months May through June offer the most favorable weather for viewing or climbing.

== See also ==
- List of mountain peaks of Alaska
- Geology of Alaska
