= Hope Highway =

Highway in Alaska

Federal Forest Highway 14
- Hope Highway; Hope Road Turnoff
- Hope Highway highlighted in red

Route information
- Maintained by Alaska DOT&PF and USFS
- Length: 17.861 mi (28.744 km)
- Existed: c. 1928–present

Major junctions
- South end: AK-1 in Bruhn-Ray Mine
- North end: Porcupine Campgrounds, Chugach National Forest in Hope

Location
- Country: United States
- State: Alaska
- Boroughs: Kenai Peninsula

Highway system
- Forest Highway System; Alaska Routes; Interstate; Scenic Byways

The Hope Highway, also known as the Hope Road Turnoff, is a Forest Highway located in the Kenai Peninsula Borough, in the U.S. state of Alaska. The highway connects the city of Hope to the Seward Highway, and travels through 17 miles (27 km) of the Chugach National Forest. The road passes the ghost town of Sunrise City and several smaller settlements, remnants of the gold rush that occurred in that area. The highway was created circa 1928 and was designated as Forest Highway 14 by the Federal Highway Administration.

== Route description ==
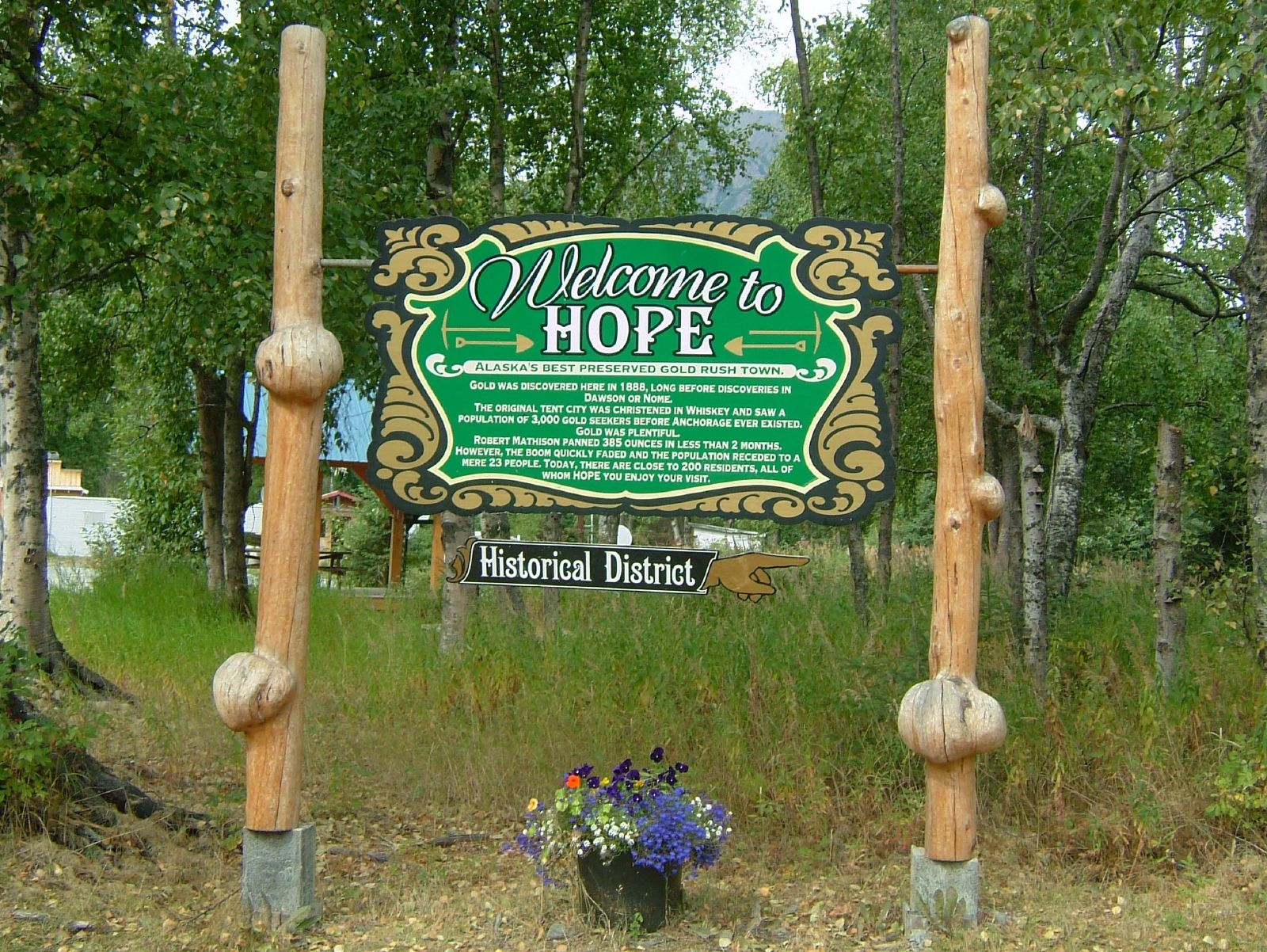
The "Welcome to Hope" sign, located alongside the highway when it enters Hope

The Hope Highway begins at an intersection with the Seward Highway (AK-1), inside Chugach National Forest. The highway proceeds north, traveling through several miles of pine forest, in a valley in the Kenai Mountain range. The highway passes alongside the Resurrection Creek, which was the source for the settlement of this area. The road proceeds through the abandoned settlement of Sunrise City, which was an old mining town. The roadway proceeds to the Turnagain Arm, and turns in a westward direction. The road continues along the arm for several miles before entering the city of Hope. The highway passes through Hope, intersecting the Old Hope Highway and several smaller streets before exiting the town and reentering the forest. The highway reaches its northern terminus, an access road to the Porcupine Creek Campgrounds. The entire length of the Hope Highway is located in the Chugach National Forest. No portion of the highway is listed on the National Highway System.

=== Traffic ===
Traffic on the Hope Highway is very low, with the highest traffic count being just over 400 vehicles daily, at its intersection with the Seward Highway. The daily average vehicle count for the highway is just under 300.

== History ==
The Hope Highway was first established in 1928. The original highway connected the city of Hope to Moose Pass, which then took people to Anchorage via the Alaska Railroad. The Seward Highway was completed in 1951, which allowed travelers to get to Hope without having to transport their vehicle on a train. The highway operated as an improved dirt road until 1952 or 1953, when the highway was finally paved. The portion of the highway that connected Hope to the campgrounds was created in the 1970s. Around the same time as the extension of the route, the Hope Highway was rerouted around the city of Hope, with the original path that traveled through the city being renamed the Old Hope Highway. In 1982, during the expansion of the Federal Forest Highway System, the Hope Highway was added to the system, due to its location and local importance.

== Major junctions ==
The entire highway is in Kenai Peninsula Borough.

Location	mi	km	Destinations	Notes
Bruhn-Ray Mine	0.00	0.00	AK-1 (Seward Highway) – Anchorage, Seward, Homer	Southern terminus
	0.24	0.39	Six Mile Creek	Rest Area
Sunrise City	7.55	12.15	Historic Sunrise City	Also known as Milepost 8
Hope	16.13	25.96	Palmer Creek Road	Access to Hope Airport and Resurrection Creek Road
Hope	16.53	26.60	Old Hope Highway	Access to downtown
Hope	17.95	28.89	Porcupine Campgrounds	End of state maintenance
1.000 mi = 1.609 km; 1.000 km = 0.621 mi

== Old Hope Highway ==
The Old Hope Highway is a short, historic route of the Hope Highway located in the city of Hope. The road is just 0.259 miles (0.417 km) long, and connects the Hope Highway to the central region of Hope. The road has an unpaved, gravel surface, and passes several small businesses and homes located in Hope. The road was part of the original Hope Highway, which was created in 1928, and remained part of the highway until circa 1970, when the highway was rerouted around Hope.
