= Vigesimal Peak =

Mountain summit in Alaska, United States

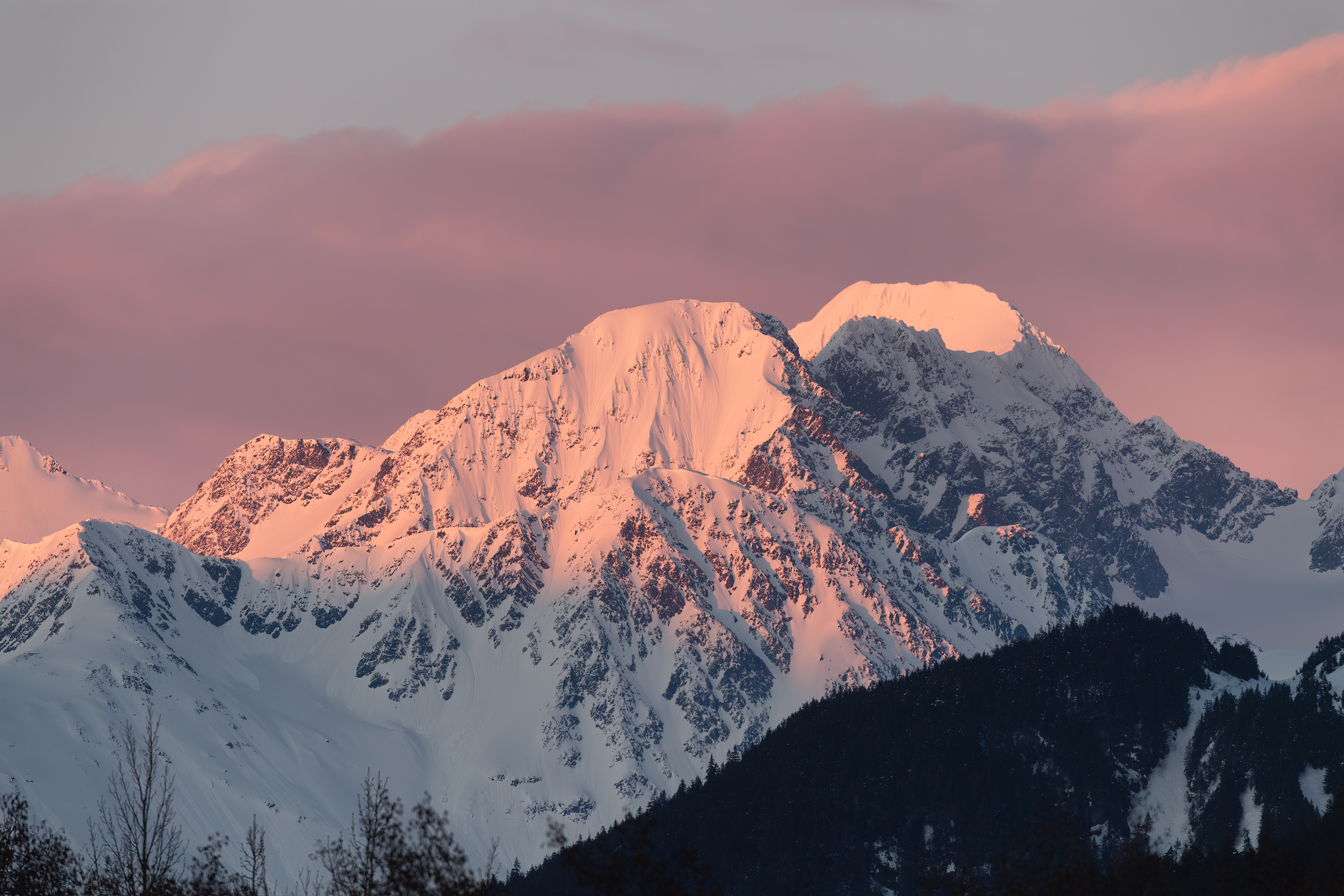
- Southwest aspect at sunset

Highest point
- Elevation: 6,550 ft (1,996 m)
- Prominence: 2,021 ft (616 m)
- Isolation: 4.38 mi (7.05 km)
- Coordinates: 60°58′42″N 148°38′34″W

Naming
- Etymology: Vigesimal

Geography
- Location within Alaska
- Location: Municipality of Anchorage
- Country: United States
- State: Alaska
- Protected area: Chugach National Forest
- Parent range: Chugach Mountains
- Topo map: USGS Seward D-5

Climbing
- First ascent: 1995 Tim Kelley

Vigesimal Peak is a 6,550-foot-elevation (1,996-meter) mountain summit in Alaska, United States.

== Description ==
Vigesimal Peak is located 45 miles (72 km) east-southeast of Anchorage and 15 miles (24 km) north of Whittier in the Chugach Mountains, on land managed by Chugach National Forest. Precipitation runoff from the mountain drains south to Turnagain Arm via Glacier River and north to Knik Arm via Knik River. Topographic relief is significant as the summit rises over 2,000 feet (550 m) above the head of Lake George Glacier in 0.57 miles (0.92 km). The peak's toponym has not been officially adopted by the U.S. Board on Geographic Names.

== Climate ==
Based on the Köppen climate classification, Vigesimal Peak is located in a subarctic climate zone with long, cold, snowy winters, and cool summers. Weather systems coming off the Gulf of Alaska are forced upwards by the Chugach Mountains (orographic lift), causing heavy precipitation in the form of rainfall and snowfall. Winter temperatures can drop below −10 °F with wind chill factors below −20 °F. This climate supports the Lake George Glacier to the north, Surprise Glacier to the northeast, the Twentymile Glacier to the south, and an unnamed glacier on the west slope.

== See also ==
- List of mountain peaks of Alaska
- Geography of Alaska
