= Begich Peak =

Mountain summit in Alaska, United States

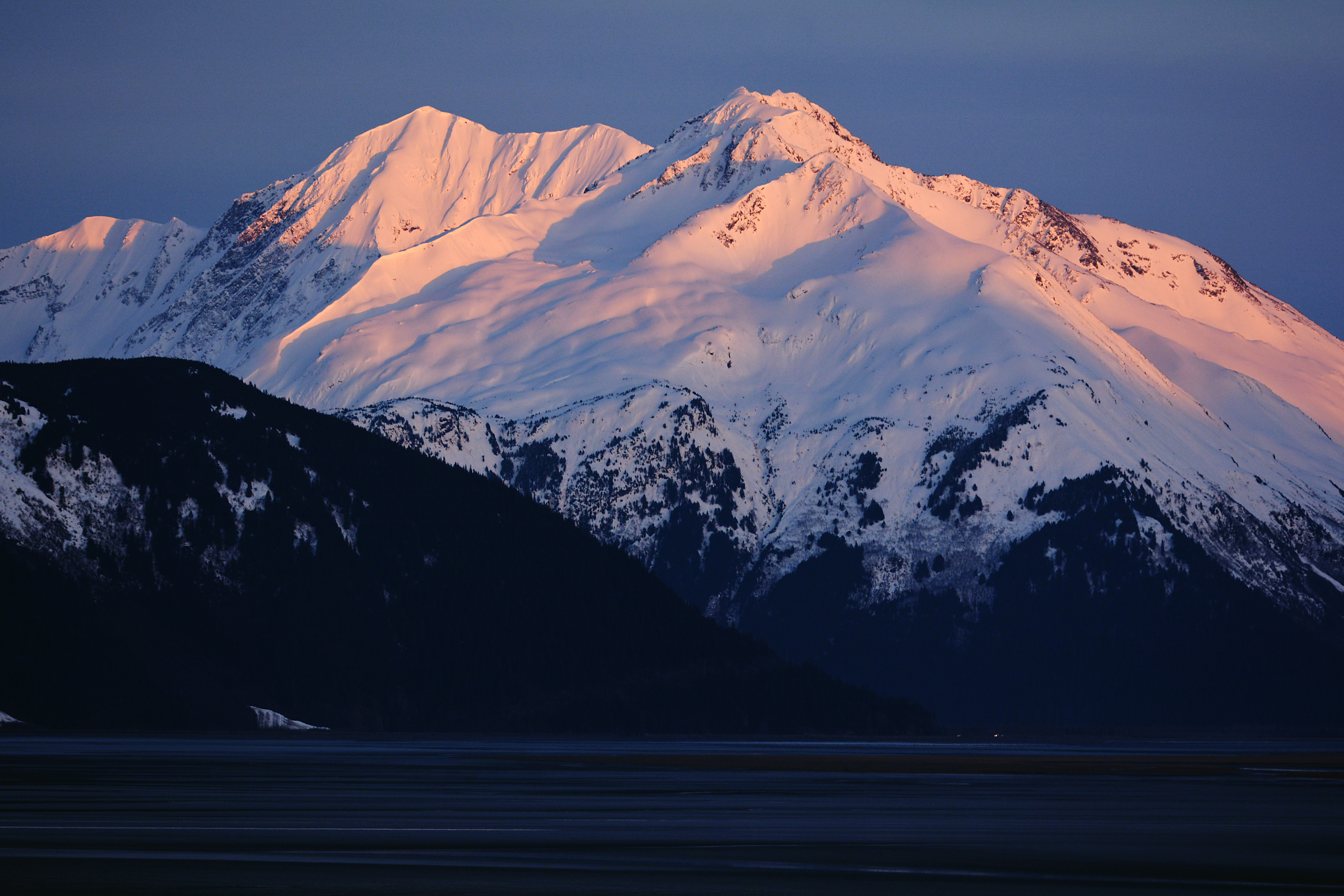
- Begich Peak (left) seen from Turnagain Arm

Highest point
- Elevation: 4,623 ft (1,409 m)
- Prominence: 1,181 ft (360 m)
- Coordinates: 60°49′22″N 148°49′45″W

Naming
- Etymology: Nick Begich

Geography
- Location within Alaska
- Interactive map of Begich Peak
- Location: Municipality of Anchorage
- Country: United States
- State: Alaska
- Protected area: Chugach National Forest
- Parent range: Chugach Mountains
- Topo map: USGS Seward D-5

Begich Peak is a 4,623-foot (1,409 m) mountain summit located in the Chugach Mountains, in Anchorage Municipality in the U.S. state of Alaska. The peak is situated in Chugach National Forest, 2.5 mi (4 km) north of Portage Lake, 5 mi (8 km) northwest of Whittier, Alaska, 1.8 mi (3 km) east of Portage Peak, and 1.24 mi (2 km) southwest of Boggs Peak. Precipitation runoff from the mountain drains into tributaries of Portage Creek and Twentymile River before emptying into Turnagain Arm. Topographic relief is significant as the summit rises approximately 4,400 feet (1,340 m) above Bear Valley in 1.25 miles (2.01 km).

== Etymology ==
The mountain's toponym was officially adopted in 1976 by the United States Geological Survey to commemorate Alaska Congressman Nick Begich (1932–1972), who was a member of the U.S. House of Representatives when he disappeared along with House majority leader Hale Boggs and two others on October 16, 1972, during an airplane flight from Anchorage to Juneau. Neither the plane's wreckage nor the pilot's and passengers' remains were ever found. The Begich, Boggs Visitor Center is located at Portage Lake.

== Climate ==
Based on the Köppen climate classification, Begich Peak is located in a subarctic climate zone with cold, snowy winters, and mild summers. Weather systems coming off the Gulf of Alaska are forced upwards by the Chugach Mountains (orographic lift), causing heavy precipitation in the form of rainfall and snowfall. Winter temperatures can drop below −10 °F with wind chill factors below −20 °F. The months May through June offer the most favorable weather for viewing or climbing.

== Gallery ==
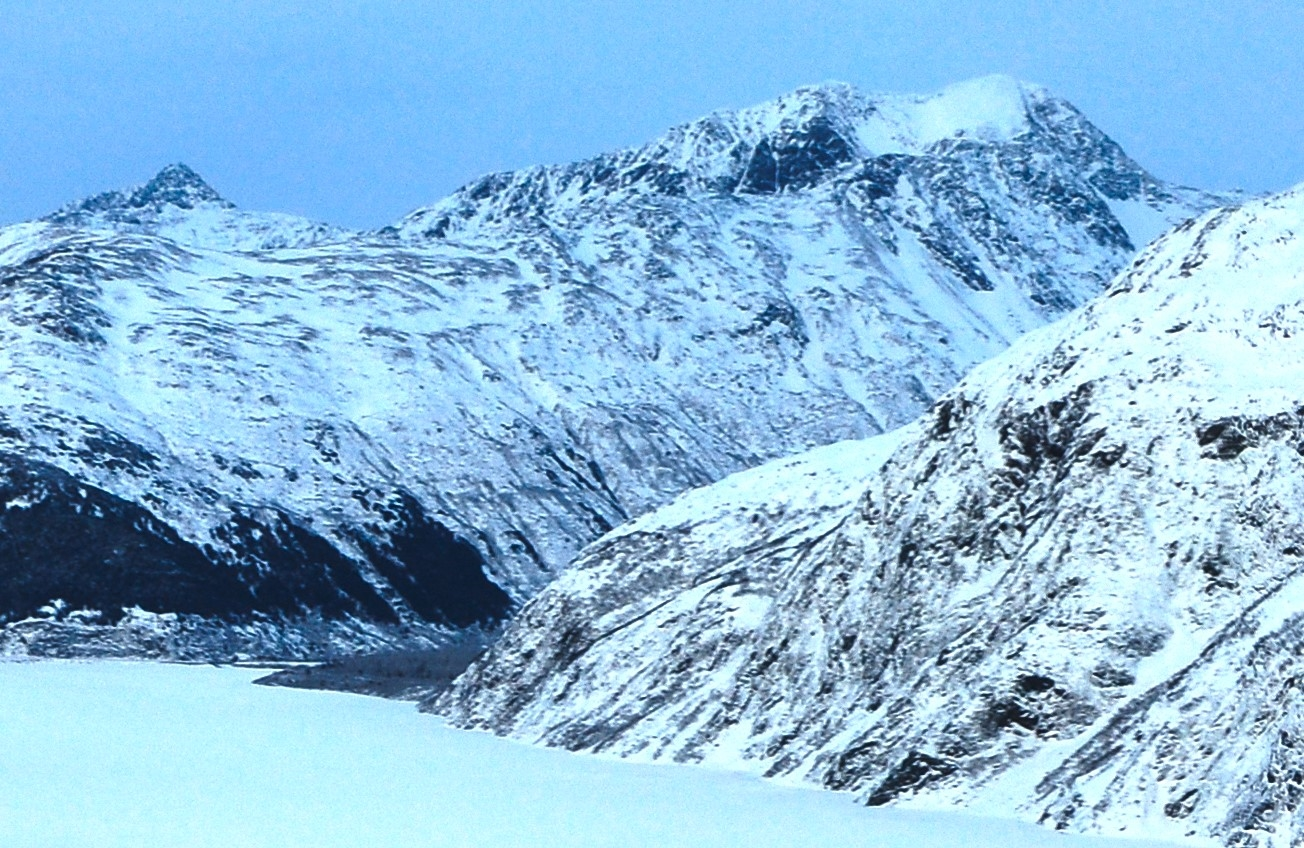
South aspect, in winter

== See also ==
- List of mountain peaks of Alaska
- Geography of Alaska
