= Hope Airport =

Hope Airport may refer to:

- Hope Airport (Alaska) in Hope, Alaska, United States (IATA: 5HO)
- Hope Aerodrome in Hope, British Columbia, Canada (IATA: YHE)
- Hope Municipal Airport in Hope, Arkansas, United States (IATA: M18)
- Bob Hope Airport in Burbank, California, United States (IATA: BUR)
