= Portage Peak =

Mountain in Alaska, United States

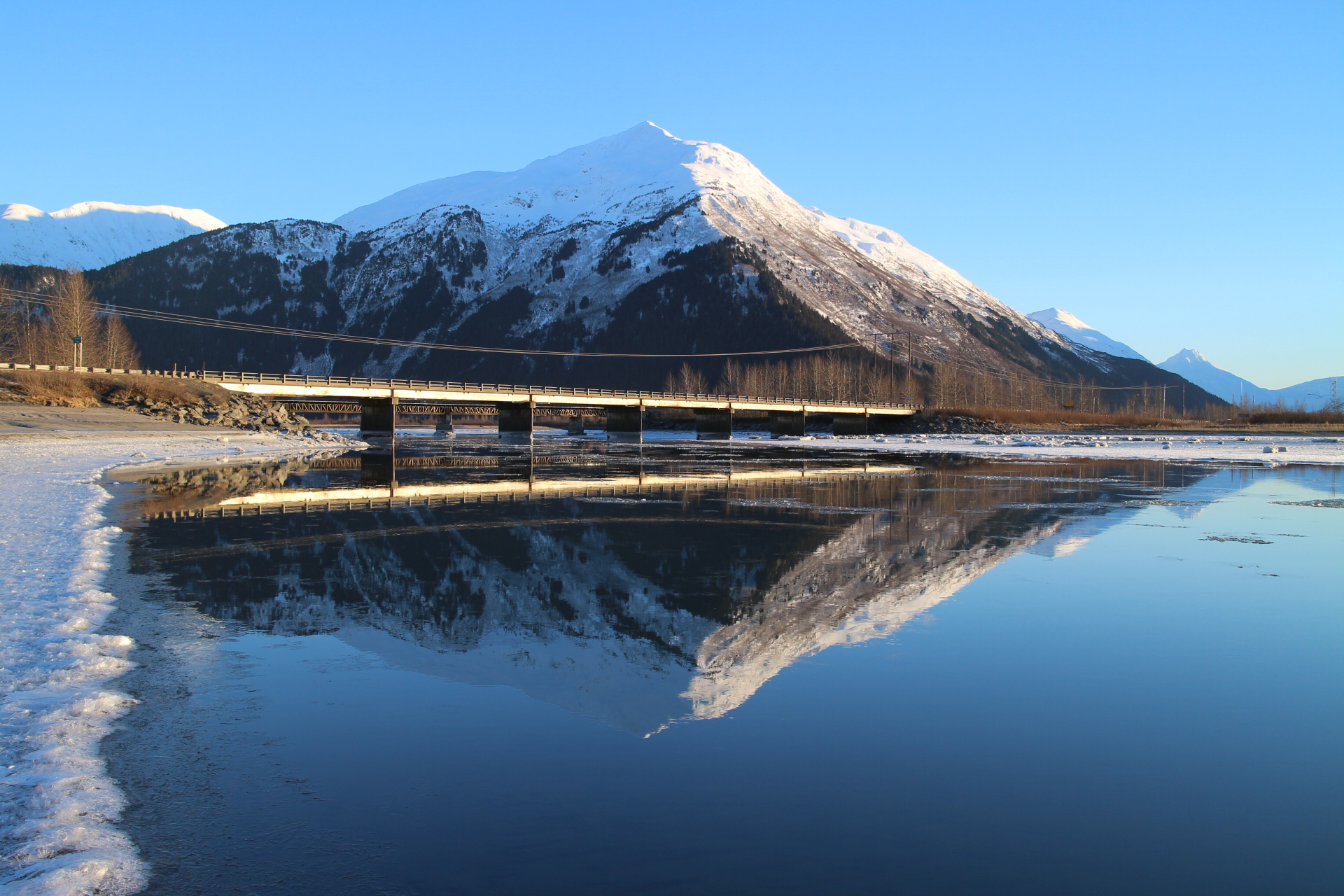
- Portage Peak, west aspect

Highest point
- Elevation: 4,347 ft (1,325 m)
- Prominence: 1,299 ft (396 m)
- Parent peak: Begich Peak
- Isolation: 1.8 mi (2.9 km)
- Coordinates: 60°49′44″N 148°52′52″W

Geography
- Location within Alaska
- Location: Chugach National Forest; Anchorage Municipality, Alaska; United States
- Parent range: Chugach Mountains
- Topo map: USGS Seward D-6

Portage Peak is a 4,347-foot (1,325 m) elevation mountain summit located in the Chugach Mountains, in Anchorage Municipality in the U.S. state of Alaska. The peak is situated in Chugach National Forest, immediately east of Twentymile River valley, and 1.8 mi (3 km) west of Begich Peak. It is set midway between Girdwood and Whittier, with the Portage Glacier Highway and Alaska Railroad traversing the southern base of the mountain. Precipitation runoff from the peak drains into Turnagain Arm via Portage Creek and Twentymile River. This mountain is unofficially named in association with the creek and nearby Portage Lake, Portage Glacier, and Portage ghost town.

== Climate ==
Based on the Köppen climate classification, Portage Peak is located in a subarctic climate zone with long, cold, snowy winters, and mild summers. Weather systems coming off the Gulf of Alaska are forced upwards by the Chugach Mountains (orographic lift), causing heavy precipitation in the form of rainfall and snowfall. Temperatures can drop below −20 °C with wind chill factors below −30 °C. The months May through June offer the most favorable weather for climbing or viewing.

== See also ==
- List of mountain peaks of Alaska
- Geology of Alaska
