= Whitecrown (Chugach Mountains) =

Mountain in Alaska, United States

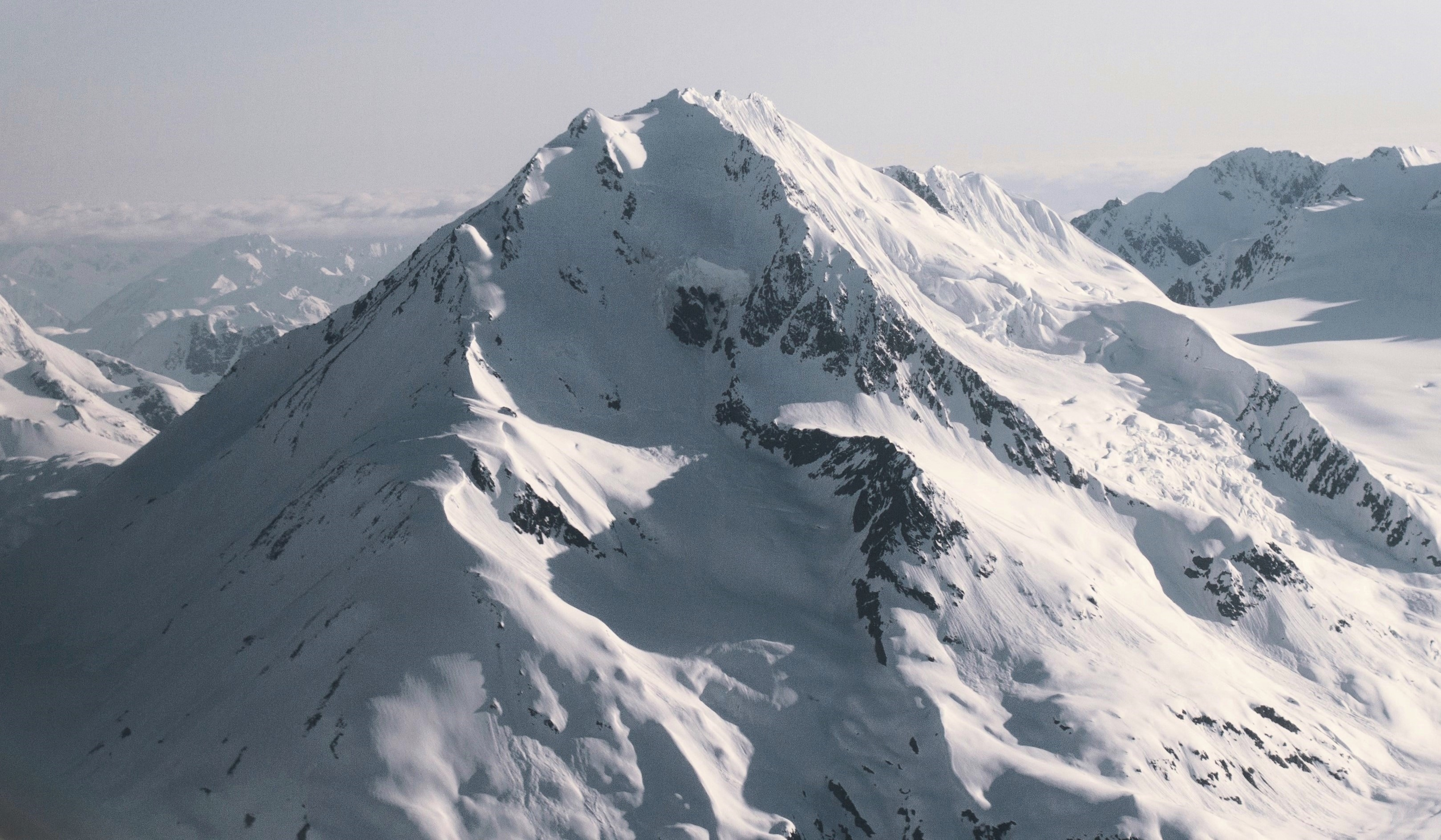
- Aerial view of Whitecrown from northeast

Highest point
- Elevation: 6,390 ft (1,948 m)
- Prominence: 1,540 ft (469 m)
- Parent peak: Peak 6550
- Isolation: 2.8 mi (4.5 km)
- Coordinates: 61°04′13″N 148°50′09″W

Geography
- Location within Alaska
- Country: United States
- State: Alaska
- Borough: Anchorage
- Protected area: Chugach National Forest
- Parent range: Chugach Mountains
- Topo map: USGS Anchorage A-5

Climbing
- First ascent: 2014

Whitecrown is a 6,390-foot (1,948 m) mountain summit in the U.S. state of Alaska.

== Description ==
Whitecrown is located 15 miles (24 km) northeast of Girdwood in the Chugach Mountains, on land managed by Chugach National Forest. Precipitation runoff from the mountain drains north to Knik Arm via Knik River and south to Turnagain Arm via the Twentymile River. Although modest in elevation, relief is significant as the summit rises approximately 4,400 feet (1,341 m) above the headwaters of Twentymile River in 1.5 miles (2.4 km). The first ascent of the summit was made March 22, 2014, by Wayne L. Todd and Carrie Wang via the southeast ridge.

== Gallery ==
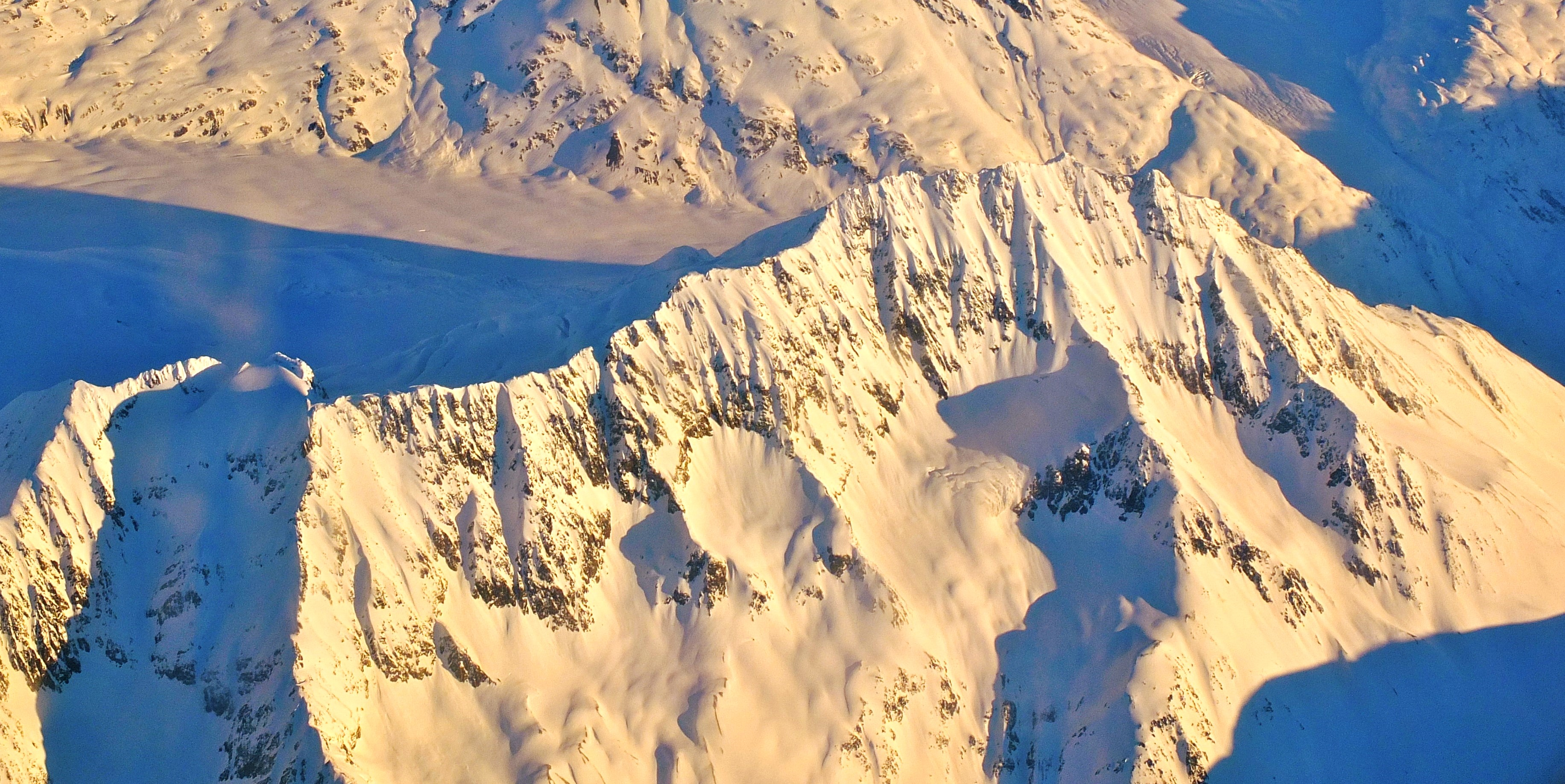
South aspect of Whitecrown from airliner

== Climate ==
Based on the Köppen climate classification, Whitecrown is located in a tundra climate zone with long, cold, snowy winters, and cool summers. Weather systems coming off the Gulf of Alaska are forced upwards by the Chugach Mountains (orographic lift), causing heavy precipitation in the form of rainfall and snowfall. Winter temperatures can drop below −10 °F with wind chill factors below −20 °F. This climate supports unnamed glaciers surrounding the peak. The months May through June offer the most favorable weather for climbing or viewing.

== See also ==
- List of mountain peaks of Alaska
- Geography of Alaska
