= Carmen River (Alaska) =

- Location within Alaska

Location
- Country: United States
- State: Alaska
- City: Anchorage

Physical characteristics
- Source: Harriman Glacier (north fork)
- 2nd source: Lowell Glacier (south fork)
- Mouth: Glacier River
  - location: Near Portage
  - coordinates: 60°54′36″N 148°48′54″W
- Length: 8.5 mi (13.7 km) (upper river), 9.5 mi (15.3 km) total
- Discharge
  - location: mouth

The Carmen River is a river 9.5 miles (15.3 km) long and 5 miles (8.0 km) northwest of Whittier near the Kenai Peninsula in Alaska. Its north fork rises in a remote valley from Harriman glacier and flows out into a larger valley where it joins with the south fork. The south fork of the river begins at the terminus of Lowell Glacier, following a valley parallel to the former stream before merging with it. The unified Carmen River flows for 0.5 miles before pooling in Carmen Lake. This first portion of the river is known as the Upper Carmen River. The final portion of the stream, known as the Lower Carmen River, begins as the outflow of the lake. The river ends abruptly after 1 mile (1.6 km) as it is joined by the Glacier River. It was reportedly named locally.
