= Resurrection Creek =

Coordinates: 60°55′36″N 149°38′40″W

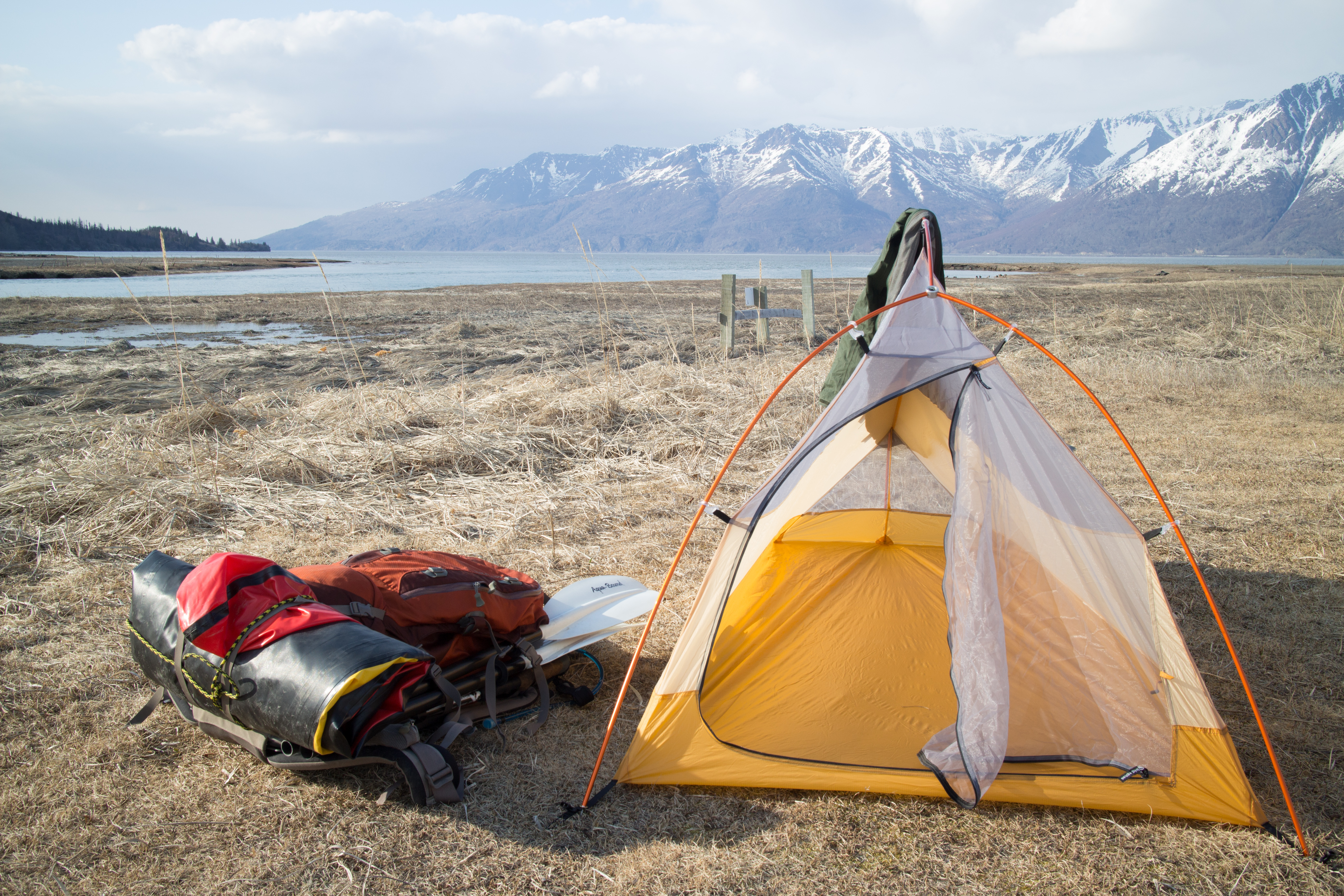
Mouth of Resurrection Creek

Resurrection Creek is a waterway in the Kenai Peninsula, Alaska, US. Along with Bear Creek, Sixmile Creek, and Glacier Creek, it is a tributary of Turnagain Arm. The stream's watershed drains 161 square miles (420 km^{2}) on the north side of the Kenai Peninsula, and the community of Hope, Alaska is located at the creek's mouth. The Hope Highway passes alongside Resurrection Creek.

== Geography ==
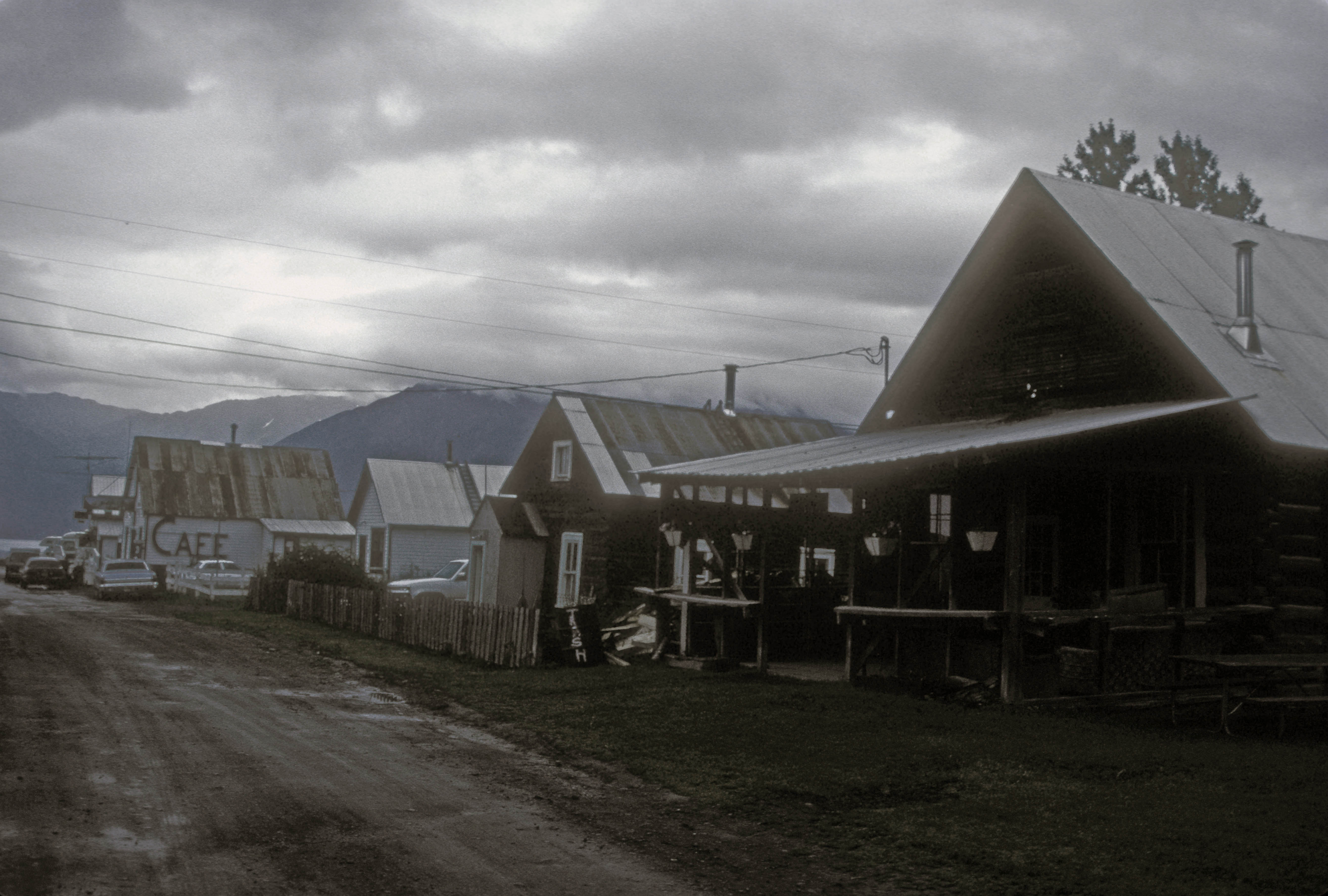
Hope City was a mining camp for Resurrection Creek, established in 1896

Resurrection Creek, the earliest gold producer of the region, flows through a broad valley floored with a thick deposit of gravels, in which, throughout the greater part of its length, the waters have cut a deep, canyon-like channel. The portion from which gold has been taken, lying between Sixmile Point and Hope, has an average grade of 66 feet (20 m) per mile, the grade of the lower 20 miles (32 km) being about 100 feet (30 m) per mile. The valley gravels are roughly stratified and have been penetrated in one place to a depth of 50 feet (15 m) below the stream level without reaching solid rock. They consist largely of slates and arkoses from the neighboring hills, but contain, in addition, an uncertain percentage of material, chiefly granitic in character, foreign to the valley.

=== Tributaries ===
Palmer Creek is the largest tributary of Resurrection Creek.

Bear Creek is the best known stream in this part of the field. It is about 5 miles (8.0 km) long and has a fall of nearly 500 feet (150 m) to the mile. Bear Creek valley is narrower than Palmer Creek valley, and while resembling it in some ways, does not have the canyon features so well developed. The country rock is a succession of arkoses inlerstratified with bluish-black slates, the beds being so thin in one or two localities as to give to the outcrops a banded structure. These beds strike N. 20° E., or nearly at right angles to the general course of the creek, the cleavage, however, running more nearly north and south. The gravels are very irregular in distribution and are made up almost entirely of material like the country rock, but include, in addition, a few bowlders of granitic rock. In two places between 25–30 feet (7.6–9.1 m) of unstratified deposits were seen. These contain a large quantity of coarse angular blocks mixed with sands and clays, the whole apparently dumped into its present position without having undergone any sorting by water. Bowlders 3–4 feet (0.91–1.22 m) in diameter are plentiful. In some localities, the surface wash is underlain by stratified sands and clays, which were probably deposited in small local basins, where they are sometimes found abutting against perpendicular rock faces or overlapping sloping surfaces. The hard gray clay locally underlying the surface wash and known as "glacial clay" rests on loose sands composed largely of slate particles and containing a large amount of water. It has been noticed in a few plates that the rock surface above this clay is worn smooth, while below it is rough and unworn. Bear Creek gold is lower in grade than any other from the Resurrection region. Like that from Palmer Creek, it is usually bright yellow in color, but may be whitish. Some native silver is found, and it is said that a small amount of native copper is also present. One large nugget of gold, valued at about $250, was found. The first claim staked on the stream yielded a little more than $2,000 the first year it was worked, but was not operated with profit in the following years. A second claim worked steadily, but in a small way, sinco the early days of Bear Creek's history has produced an average of $8 a day per man. Two hydraulic plants were installed on Bear Creek.

== History ==
In the 1890s, Resurrection Creek was the site of Alaska's first gold rush. Charles Miller located the first claim on the creek before leasing it to others for working. By 1893, about a dozen miners were working claims on at the creek. In the following year, even more claims were established on Resurrection Creek. Tyonek was a major port during the Resurrection Creek gold rush of the 1880s-90s, but declined after Anchorage was established.
