= Hope, Alaska =

- Census-designated place
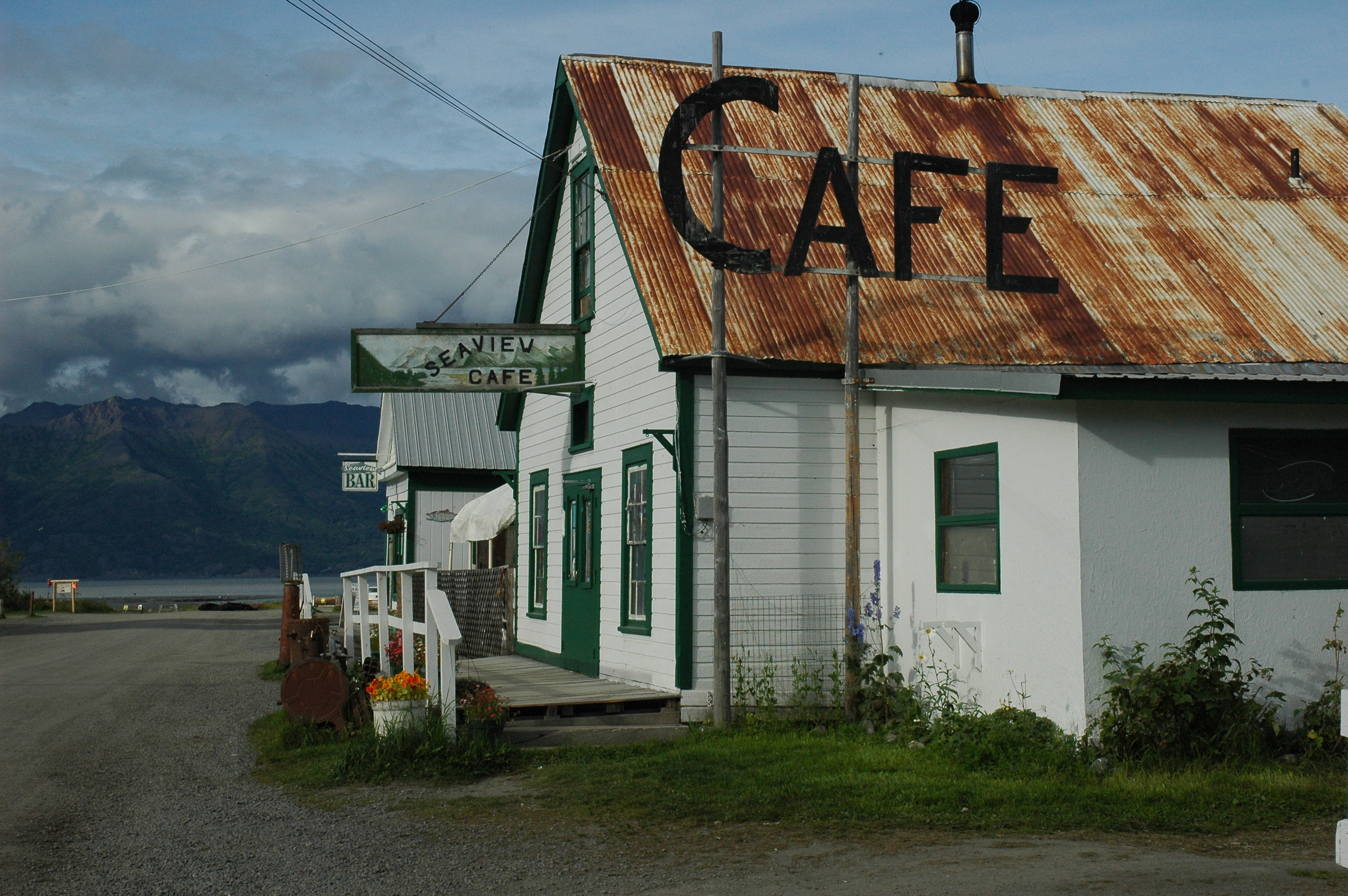
- Hope, a former gold-mining town, is now a popular weekend retreat for Anchorage residents.

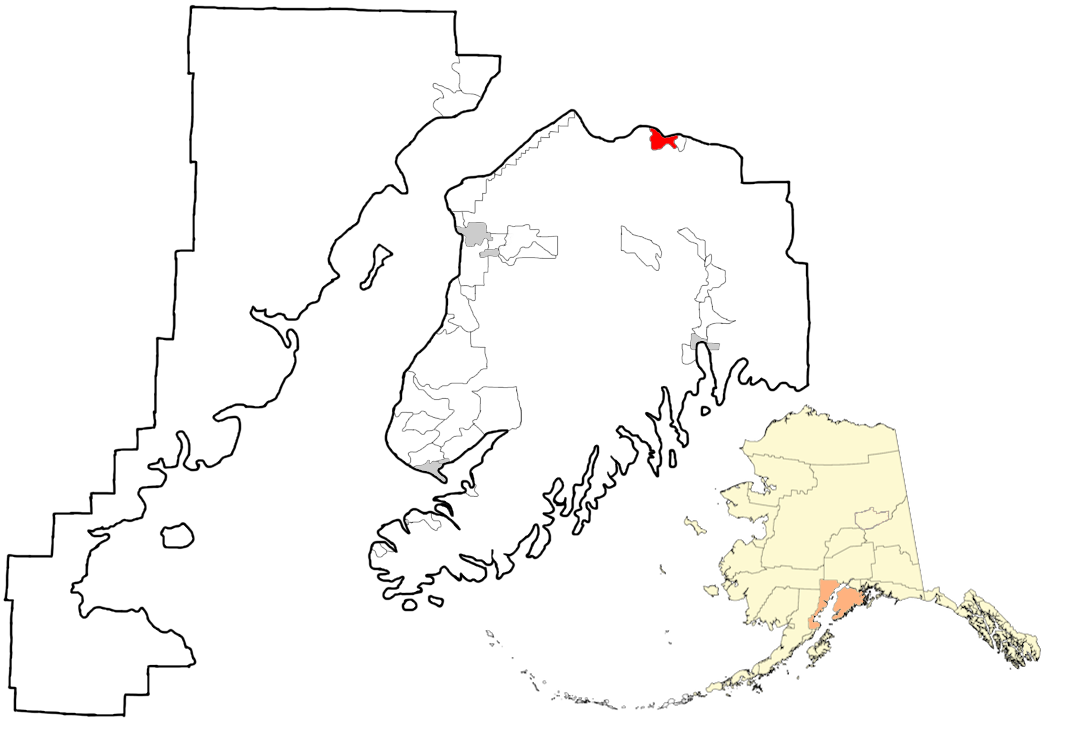
- Location in Kenai Peninsula Borough, Alaska
- Coordinates: 60°55′10″N 149°38′31″W
- Country: United States
- State: Alaska
- Borough: Kenai Peninsula

Government
  - Borough mayor: Peter Micciche
  - State senator: Jesse Bjorkman (R)
  - State rep.: Ben Carpenter (R)

Area
  - Total: 51.79 sq mi (134.14 km^{2})
  - Land: 51.72 sq mi (133.96 km^{2})
  - Water: 0.069 sq mi (0.18 km^{2})
- Elevation: 43 ft (13 m)

Population (2020)
  - Total: 161
  - Density: 3.1/sq mi (1.2/km^{2})
- Time zone: UTC-9 (Alaska (AKST))
  - Summer (DST): UTC-8 (AKDT)
- ZIP code: 99605
- Area code: 907
- FIPS code: 02-33580
- GNIS feature ID: 1422645

Hope is a census-designated place (CDP) in Kenai Peninsula Borough in the U.S. state of Alaska. It is 70 miles (110 km) south of Anchorage. As of the 2020 census, Hope had a population of 161. The Hope Historic District, which includes the surviving elements of the former mining town, was listed on the National Register of Historic Places in 1972.

== Geography ==
Hope is located at 60°55′10″N 149°38′31″W (60.920280, -149.64028) (Sec. 33, T010N, R002W, Seward Meridian). Hope is located in the Seward Recording District.

Hope lies on the northern end of Kenai Peninsula, on the south shore of the Turnagain Arm of Cook Inlet. The community lies at the end of the 17-mile (27 km) Hope Highway, northwest of the Seward Highway, near the mouth of Resurrection Creek. Winter temperatures range from 14 to 27 °F (−10 to −3 °C); summer temperatures vary from 45 to 65 °F (7 to 18 °C). Average annual precipitation is 20 inches (510 mm).

According to the United States Census Bureau, the CDP has a total area of 51.8 square miles (134.1 km^{2}), of which 0.07 square miles (0.18 km^{2}), or 0.13%, are water. The CDP includes the settlement of Hope in the valley of Resurrection Creek and extends east and west to the ridgecrests that define the valley. To the south it extends up Resurrection Creek to Palmer Creek on the east side and Gold Gulch on the west side. It is bordered to the east by the Sunrise CDP.

== Climate ==
Hope has a dry-summer continental subarctic climate (Köppen Dsc).

Climate data for Hope
Month	Jan	Feb	Mar	Apr	May	Jun	Jul	Aug	Sep	Oct	Nov	Dec	Year
Record high °F (°C)	49 (9)	56 (13)	58 (14)	71 (22)	77 (25)	82 (28)	81 (27)	80 (27)	73 (23)	61 (16)	50 (10)	52 (11)	82 (28)
Mean daily maximum °F (°C)	25.1 (−3.8)	27.7 (−2.4)	34.7 (1.5)	45 (7)	56.7 (13.7)	63.1 (17.3)	66 (19)	63.7 (17.6)	55.3 (12.9)	42 (6)	29 (−2)	25.7 (−3.5)	44.5 (6.9)
Mean daily minimum °F (°C)	11.6 (−11.3)	12.4 (−10.9)	17.5 (−8.1)	26.8 (−2.9)	35.1 (1.7)	43 (6)	48.2 (9.0)	46.2 (7.9)	38.7 (3.7)	28.2 (−2.1)	17 (−8)	12.5 (−10.8)	28.1 (−2.2)
Record low °F (°C)	−31 (−35)	−22 (−30)	−15 (−26)	−2 (−19)	21 (−6)	30 (−1)	35 (2)	30 (−1)	18 (−8)	−2 (−19)	−17 (−27)	−23 (−31)	−31 (−35)
Average precipitation inches (mm)	1.84 (47)	1.54 (39)	1.24 (31)	0.79 (20)	0.68 (17)	1.05 (27)	2 (51)	2.64 (67)	3.17 (81)	2.59 (66)	2.24 (57)	2.39 (61)	22.17 (563)
Average snowfall inches (cm)	11.5 (29)	12.2 (31)	9.7 (25)	2.6 (6.6)	0 (0)	0 (0)	0 (0)	0 (0)	0 (0)	4.2 (11)	15.5 (39)	18.6 (47)	74.4 (189)
Average precipitation days	8	6	6	5	5	6	9	9	12	9	10	9	94

== History ==
"Hope City" was a mining camp for Resurrection Creek, established in 1896. The Hope post office began operating in 1897. Portions of the town were destroyed in the 1964 Good Friday earthquake.

There are two community associations.

The Hope Community Library was established in 1987. It resides in the Historic Hope schoolhouse, originally built in 1938.

== Demographics ==
Historical population
Census	Pop.	Note	%±
1920	44		—
1930	15		−65.9%
1940	71		373.3%
1950	63		−11.3%
1960	44		−30.2%
1970	51		15.9%
1980	103		102.0%
1990	161		56.3%
2000	137		−14.9%
2010	192		40.1%
2020	161		−16.1%
U.S. Decennial Census

Hope first appeared on the 1920 U.S. Census as an unincorporated village. In 1980 it was made a census-designated place (CDP).

As of the census of 2000, there were 137 people, 77 households, and 35 families residing in the CDP. The population density was 2.6 inhabitants per square mile (1.0/km^{2}). There were 175 housing units at an average density of 3.4 per square mile (1.3/km^{2}). The racial makeup of the CDP was 91.97% White, 0.73% Black or African American, 2.19% Native American, 1.46% Asian, and 3.65% from two or more races. 2.19% of the population were Hispanic or Latino of any race.

There were 77 households, out of which 15.6% had children under the age of 18 living with them, 42.9% were married couples living together, 2.6% had a female householder with no husband present, and 54.5% were non-families. 53.2% of all households were made up of individuals, and 15.6% had someone living alone who was 65 years of age or older. The average household size was 1.78 and the average family size was 2.69.

In the CDP, the population was spread out, with 16.1% under the age of 18, 4.4% from 18 to 24, 22.6% from 25 to 44, 40.1% from 45 to 64, and 16.8% who were 65 years of age or older. The median age was 47 years. For every 100 females, there were 107.6 males. For every 100 females age 18 and over, there were 125.5 males.

The median income for a household in the CDP was $21,786, and the median income for a family was $24,432. Males had a median income of >$0 versus $37,656 for females. The per capita income for the CDP was $9,079. There were none of the families and 11.7% of the population living below the poverty line, including no under eighteens and 100.0% of those over 64.

== Public services ==
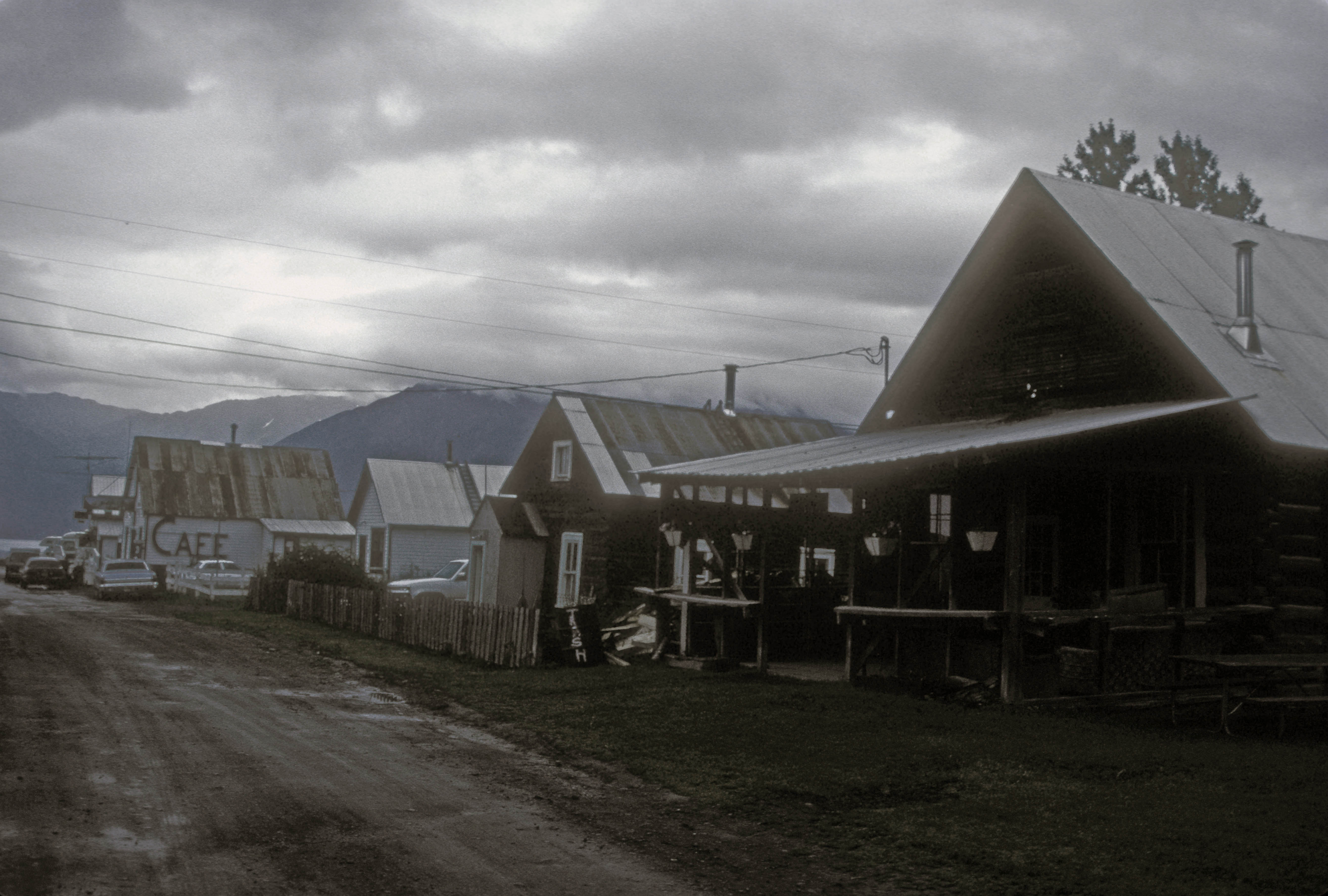
Main Street

Approximately one-fourth of homes use individual water wells and septic tank systems, and are fully plumbed. The school operates its own well water system. Many homes in this area are used only seasonally. The borough provides a refuse transfer site in Hope. Electricity is provided by Chugach Electric Association. There is one school located in the community, attended by 14 students. Local hospitals or health clinics include Central Peninsula General Hospital in Soldotna (907-262-4404) or Anchorage hospitals. Hope is classified as a highway village, and is found in EMS Region 2J in the Kenai Peninsula Region. Emergency services have highway and air access. Emergency service is provided by volunteers. Auxiliary health care is provided by Hope/Sunrise EMS (907-782-3174/3630): Central Peninsula Hospital in Soldotna or Anchorage hospitals.

== Economy and transportation ==
The school and local retail businesses provide the only employment in Hope. Recreational gold prospecting, including gold panning, metal detecting, and dredging is available. Some commercial mining activities continue today. A small sawmill is used by the community. Two residents hold a commercial fishing permit.

Hope is accessible from the Seward Highway 17 miles (27 km) to the southeast. The state-owned Hope Airport has a gravel airstrip measuring 2,000 by 90 feet (610 by 27 m). Anchorage (20 mi [32 km] to the northwest by air; 88 mi [142 km] by highway) and Kenai (60 mi [97 km] southwest by air; 104 mi [167 km] by highway) offer a variety of transportation services.

Taxes: Sales: 3% (Borough), Property: 6.5 mills (Borough), Special: None
