= Sixmile Creek (Alaska) =

Waterway with rafting in Alaska

Coordinates: 60°54′18″N 149°25′38″W

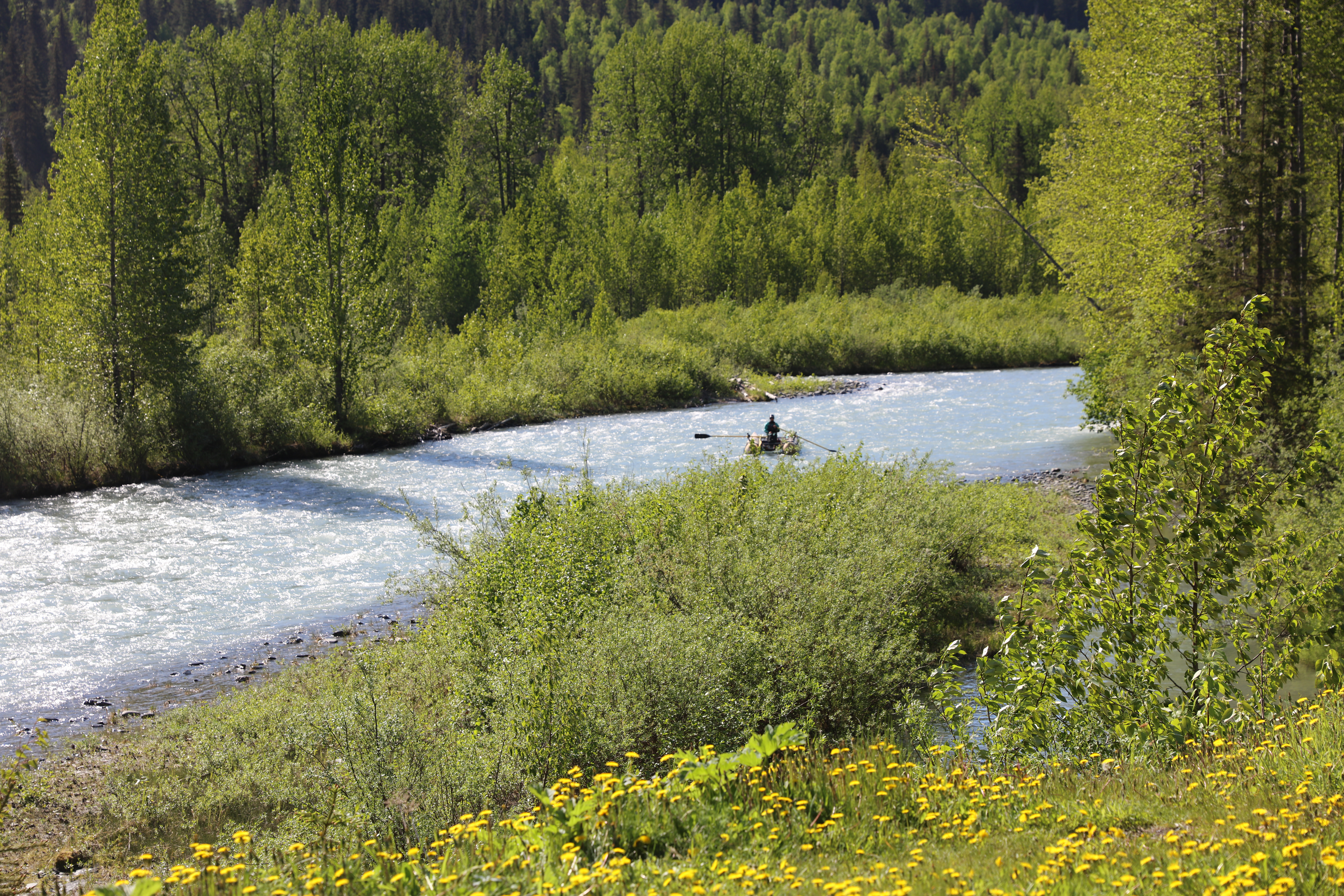
Sixmile Creek

Sixmile Creek is a short, approximately 12 miles (19 km) waterway with some of the most exciting whitewater rafting in Alaska. The Six Mile Creek drainage starts as Granite Creek flowing from the top of Turnagain Pass on the Seward Highway, part of the National Scenic Highway Program. Bench Creek and Center Creek join to become East Fork Six Mile Creek and Granite Creek is the largest tributary, contributing most of the water. At the confluence with Canyon Creek, it becomes Six Mile Creek which flows about eight miles to where it empties into Turnagain Arm shortly after flowing past the ghost town of Sunrise along the Hope Highway. There is a scenic outlook just before the Hope Junction with a grand view of the confluence of the creeks and the Canyon Creek Bridge that is pictured on the State of Alaska's website .

Six Mile Creek was mined for gold during the early 1900s and still has many active claims mined to this day. Whitewater enthusiasts have been enjoying this scenic gorge for about 20 years with commercial operations starting in the 1980s under special use permits with the US Forest Service. Six Mile Creek water levels can change a somewhat peaceful little creek to a raging Class V river. There have been both private boating and commercial operation fatalities as well during the few years it has been a whitewater recreation area. The creek is located in the northeastern portion of Kenai Peninsula Borough, across Turnagain Arm from the southernmost areas of the Municipality of Anchorage.

== Enjoying Sixmile Creek ==
Some of the most popular ways to enjoy and exploring Alaska's Sixmile Creek include a paved walking and cycling path, scenic overlook for photography, public gold panning and whitewater rafting. Find the cycling and walking path along East Fork Sixmile Creek, accessible from the Canyon Creek Rest Stop & Overlook near Mile 57 of Seward Highway (AK 1). Between Mile 57 and 58 of Seward Highway you can explore a lesser known footbridge that spans East Fork. For the footbridge, park at the small turnoff (notice the blue "In Memory of Jay Stafford" sign) and follow paved path north a short ways. A dirt path located at 60.774091, -149.405511 will take you to the bridge. The view from the walking bridge is spectacular, a deep cut gorge right below your feet, with rushing clear water over smoothed and rounded bedrock, flanked by more jagged and crumbling cliffs. Fall colors are impressive from the canyon overlook (no walking required), but visitors can often be seen taking pictures of the gorge at any time of year. Looking for a uniquely Alaskan activity? For designated public gold panning areas follow the Hope Rd. turnoff just south of the Canyon Creek bridge. Signs designate public panning regions. In general, panning is permitted from .7 miles to 5 mile North of the Hope Junction. Follow the US Forest Service Alaska Gold Panning Guide for specific rules and locations. And of course, there's no denying that whitewater rafting is the crown jewel of Sixmile Creek adventures. From Seward to Anchorage, summer through fall, locals and visitors descend on Hope, Alaska to embark on a number of guided whitewater rafting trips on Class III through V rapids along with less thrilling yet equaling enjoyable float trips of Sixmile Creek and Turnagain Arm. During your travels, consider Sixmile Creek and Hope, Alaska as a pitstop. Breakup your drive from Anchorage to Seward or Homer with a little sightseeing, hiking, cycling or the ever-thrilling whitewater rafting adventure. For whitewater rafting near Anchorage, Alaska consider FlowAK.com, NOVA Alaska and Chugach Outdoor Center.
