= Twentymile River =

River near the Kenai Peninsula in Alaska

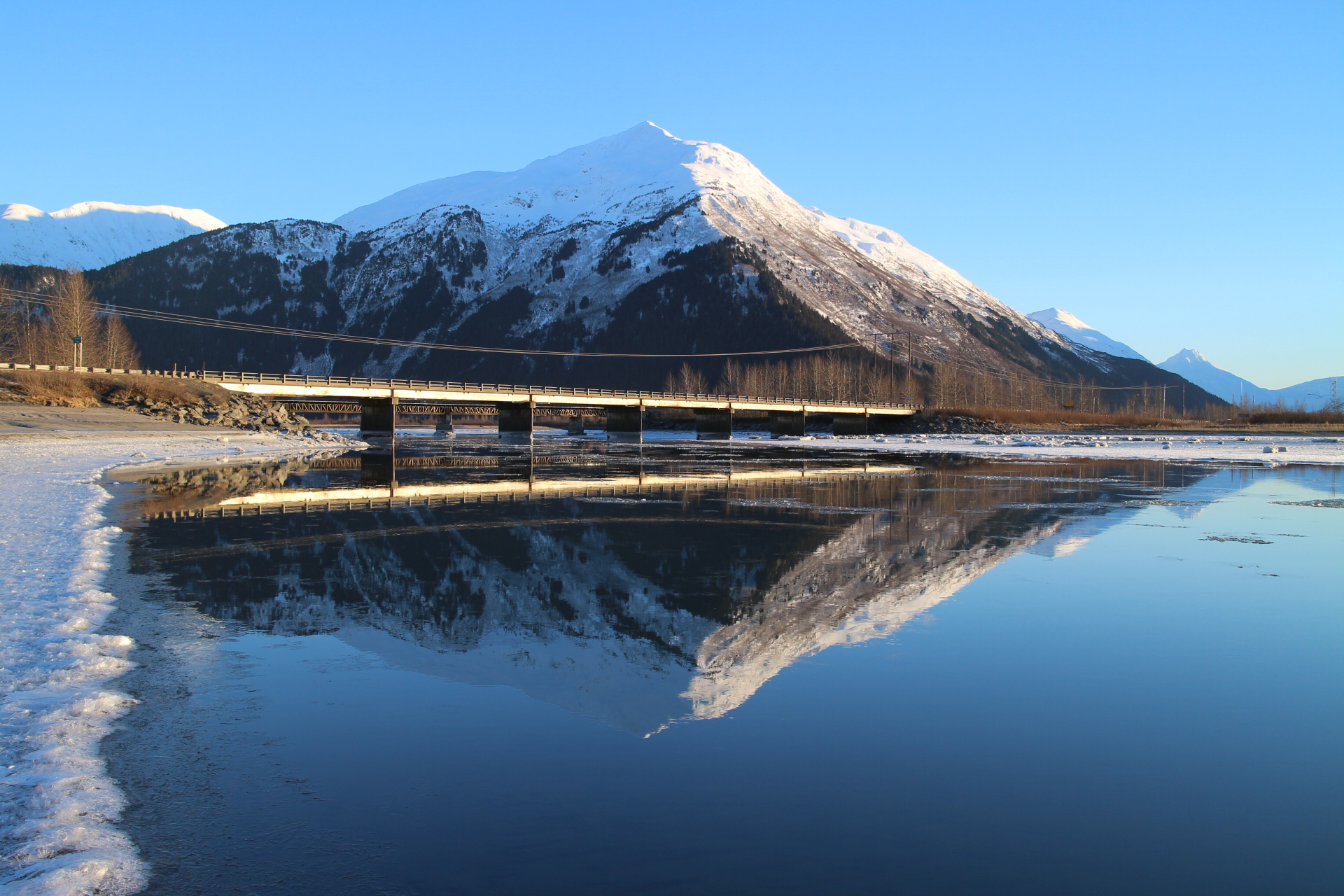
- Twentymile River at its delta at the Seward Highway bridge. (Portage Peak in the background)

- Location in Alaska

Location
- Country: United States
- State: Alaska
- City: Portage

Physical characteristics
- Source: Various small glaciers
- Mouth: Turnagain Arm
  - location: Portage
  - coordinates: 60°50′43″N 148°59′21″W
  - elevation: 0 m (0 ft)
- Length: 17 mi (27 km)
- Discharge
  - location: mouth

Basin features
- Tributaries
  - left: Moraine River, Glacier River

The Twentymile River is a river near the Kenai Peninsula in Alaska. It rises in a remote valley from meltwater of several small glaciers on Whitecrown in the Chugach Mountains and flows out into a large, wide valley where it receives the water of the Moraine and Glacier rivers. Eventually, the river empties into Turnagain Arm after flowing 17 miles (27 km) to a broad marshy delta alongside the deltas of Portage Creek and the Placer River. Contrary to popular belief, the source of the river is not Twentymile Glacier.

This river is known locally for its large runs of smelt (hooligan) every summer during the month of May. Many people from Anchorage go there to dipnet for them. It also has some small salmon runs.
