= Hope Airport (Alaska) =

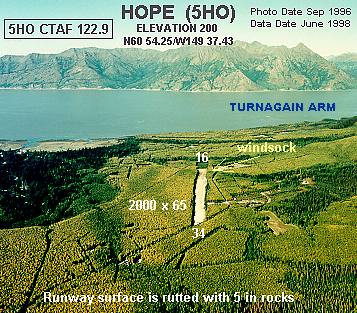
- Aerial view of airport from the south, 1996
- IATA: none; ICAO: none; FAA LID: 5HO

Summary
- Airport type: Public
- Owner: Alaska DOT&PF - Central Region
- Serves: Hope, Alaska
- Elevation AMSL: 200 ft (61 m)
- Coordinates: 60°54′15″N 149°37′26″W

Map
- Location of airport in Alaska

Runways
Direction	Length		Surface
Direction	ft	m	Surface
16/34	2,000	610	Gravel

Statistics (2011)
- Aircraft operations: 480
- Source: Federal Aviation Administration

Hope Airport (FAA LID: 5HO) is a state-owned public-use airport located one nautical mile (2 km) southeast of the central business district of Hope, in the Kenai Peninsula Borough of the U.S. state of Alaska. This airport is included in the FAA's National Plan of Integrated Airport Systems for 2011–2015, which categorized it as a general aviation facility.

== Facilities and aircraft ==
Hope Airport covers an area of 62 acres (25 ha) at an elevation of 200 feet (61 m) above mean sea level. It has one runway designated 16/34 with a gravel surface measuring 2,000 by 90 feet (610 x 27 m). For the 12-month period ending May 31, 2011, the airport had 480 aircraft operations, an average of 40 per month: 90% general aviation and 10% air taxi.

== See also ==
- List of airports in Alaska
