= Glacier River =

- Location within Alaska

Location
- Country: United States
- State: Alaska
- City: Anchorage

Physical characteristics
- Source: Twentymile Glacier
- Mouth: Twentymile River
  - location: Near Portage
  - coordinates: 60°53′43″N 148°54′33″W
  - elevation: 33 m (108 ft)
- Length: 6.5 mi (10.5 km)
- Discharge
  - location: mouth

Basin features
- Tributaries
  - left: Carmen River

The Glacier River is a river 12 miles (19 km) northwest of Whittier near the Kenai Peninsula in Alaska. It rises in a remote valley from a glacial meltwater lake from Twentymile glacier and flows out into a large, wide valley where it receives the water of the Carmen River. The river ends abruptly after 6.5 miles (10.5 km) as it is joined by the Twentymile River. It was named by Captain E. F. Glenn in 1898.
