= Turnagain Arm =

Waterway into the northwestern part of the Gulf of Alaska

Coordinates: 60.9872°N 149.7947°W

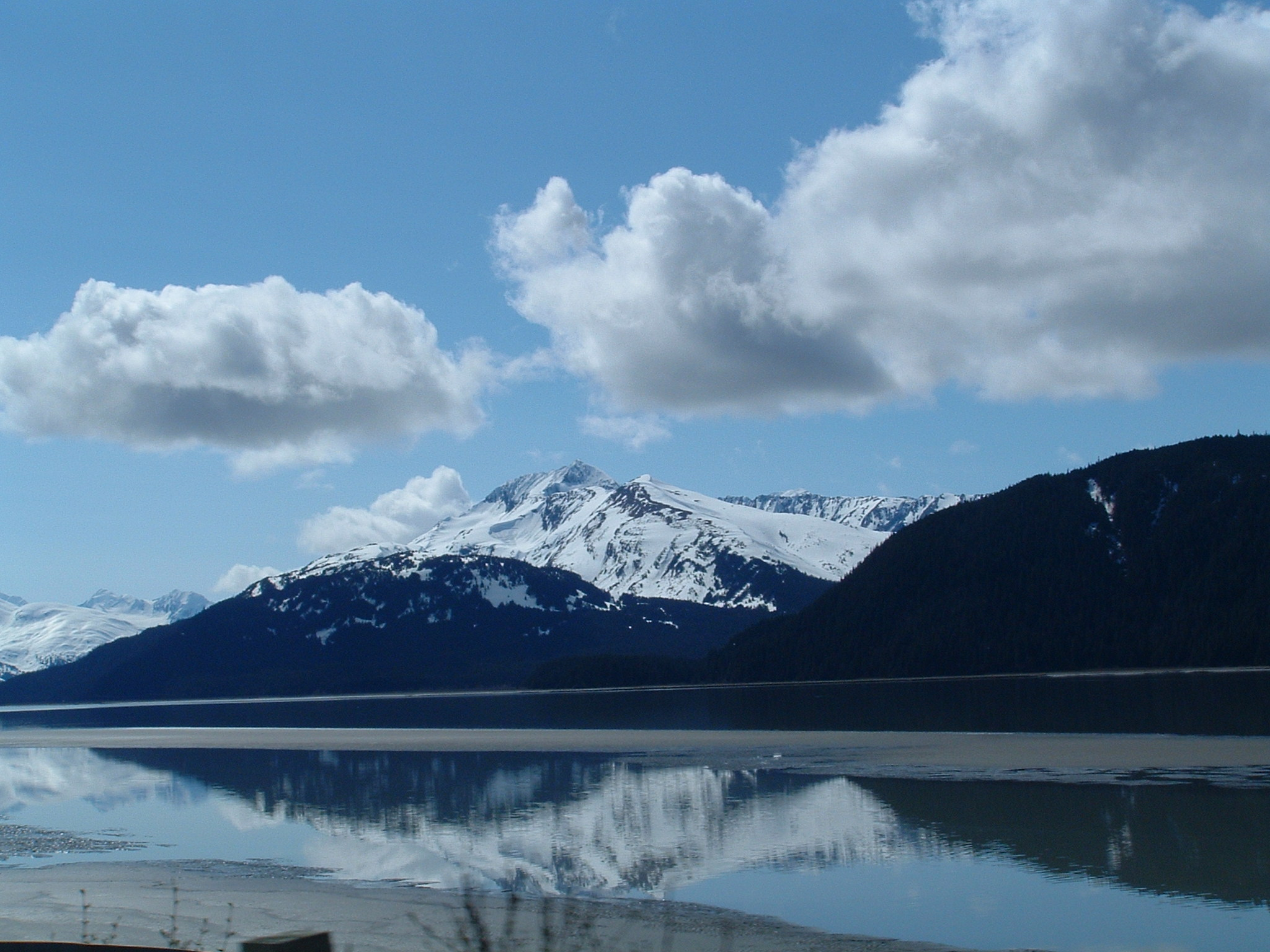
Turnagain Arm from Anchorage.

Turnagain Arm (Dena'ina: Tutl'uh) is a waterway into the northwestern part of the Gulf of Alaska. It is one of two narrow branches at the north end of Cook Inlet, the other being Knik Arm. Turnagain is subject to climate extremes and large tide ranges.

== Geography ==
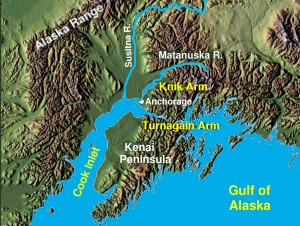
Cook Inlet with Knik and Turnagain arms.

Turnagain extends in an east–west direction, and is between 40–45 miles (64–72 km) long. It forms part of the northern boundary of Kenai Peninsula, and reaches on the east to within 12 miles (19 km) of Passage Canal, a western branch of Prince William Sound. Turnagain is characterized by remarkably large tides of up to 40 feet (12 meters) which are the largest tides in the United States. The flood tide often begins with a tidal bore especially on large tides with a strong east wind, which has a height of 6 feet (1.8 m) at times, and runs in from the west at a speed of 5–6 miles (8.0–9.7 km) an hour. At low tide, the arm becomes a broad mud flat, cut by the stream channels. Historically small steamers entered and left on high water though the practice is now rare since most if not all the places that they went are now connected by road.

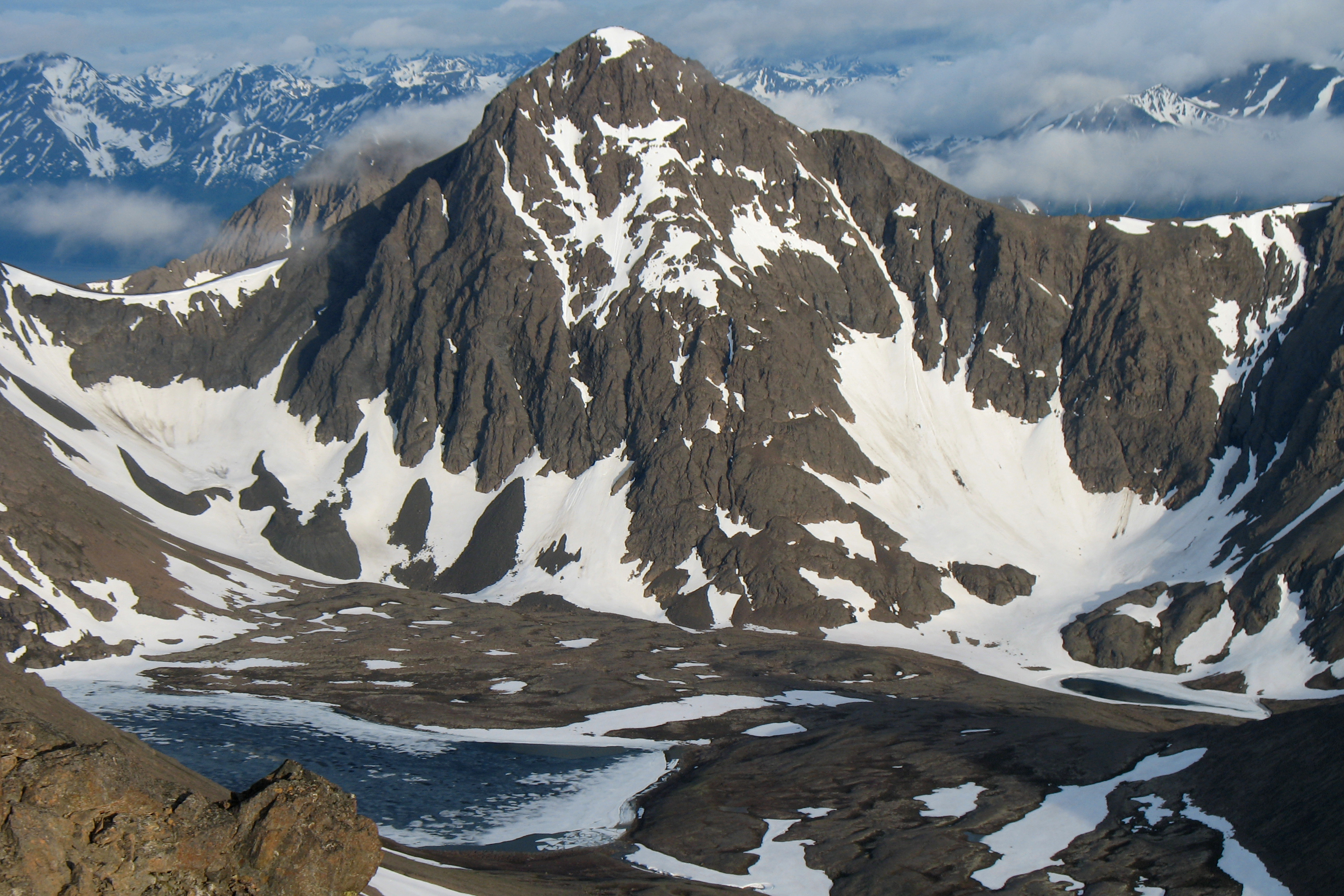
South Yuyanq' Ch'ex.

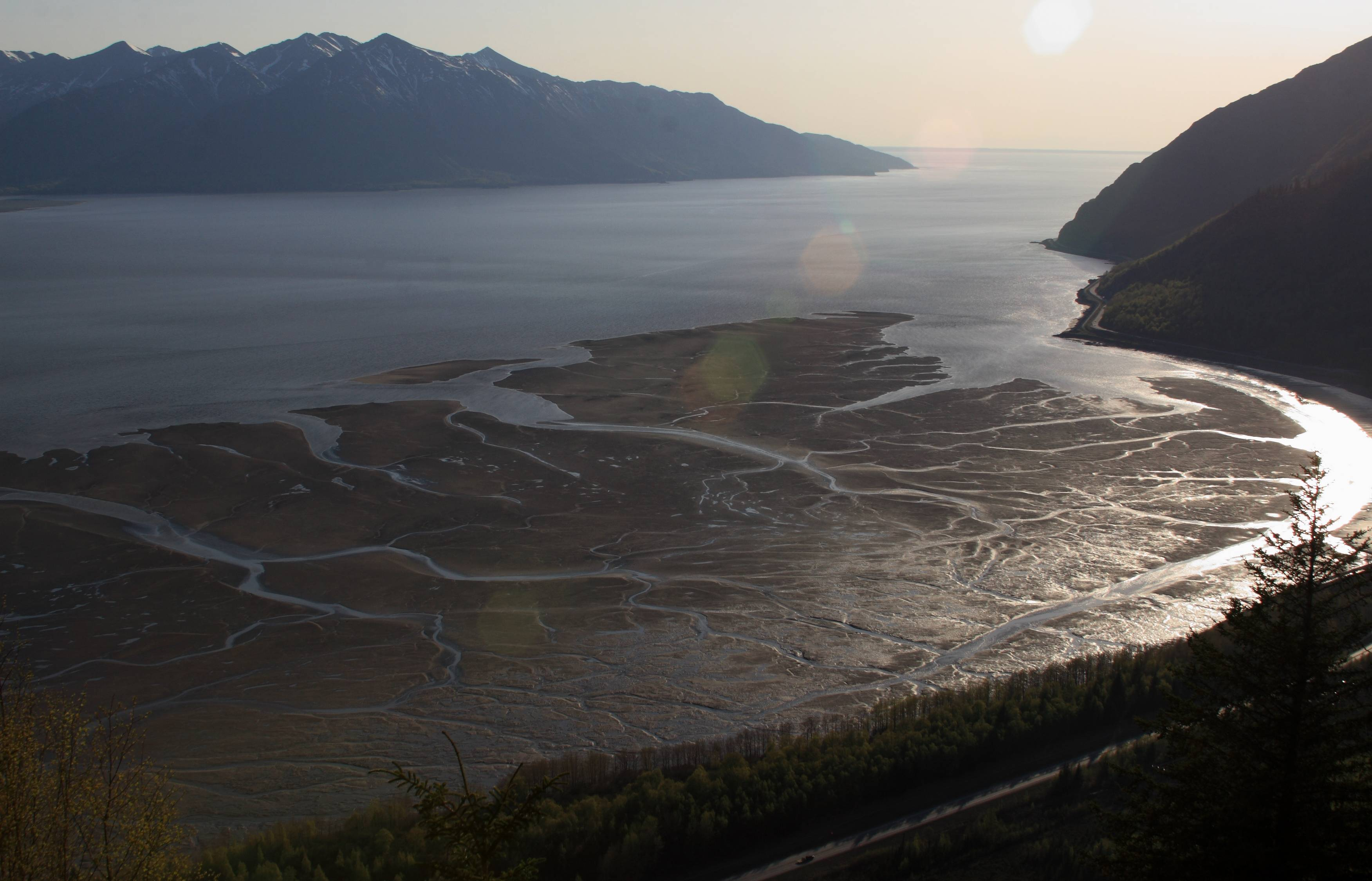
Turnagain Arm mudflats.

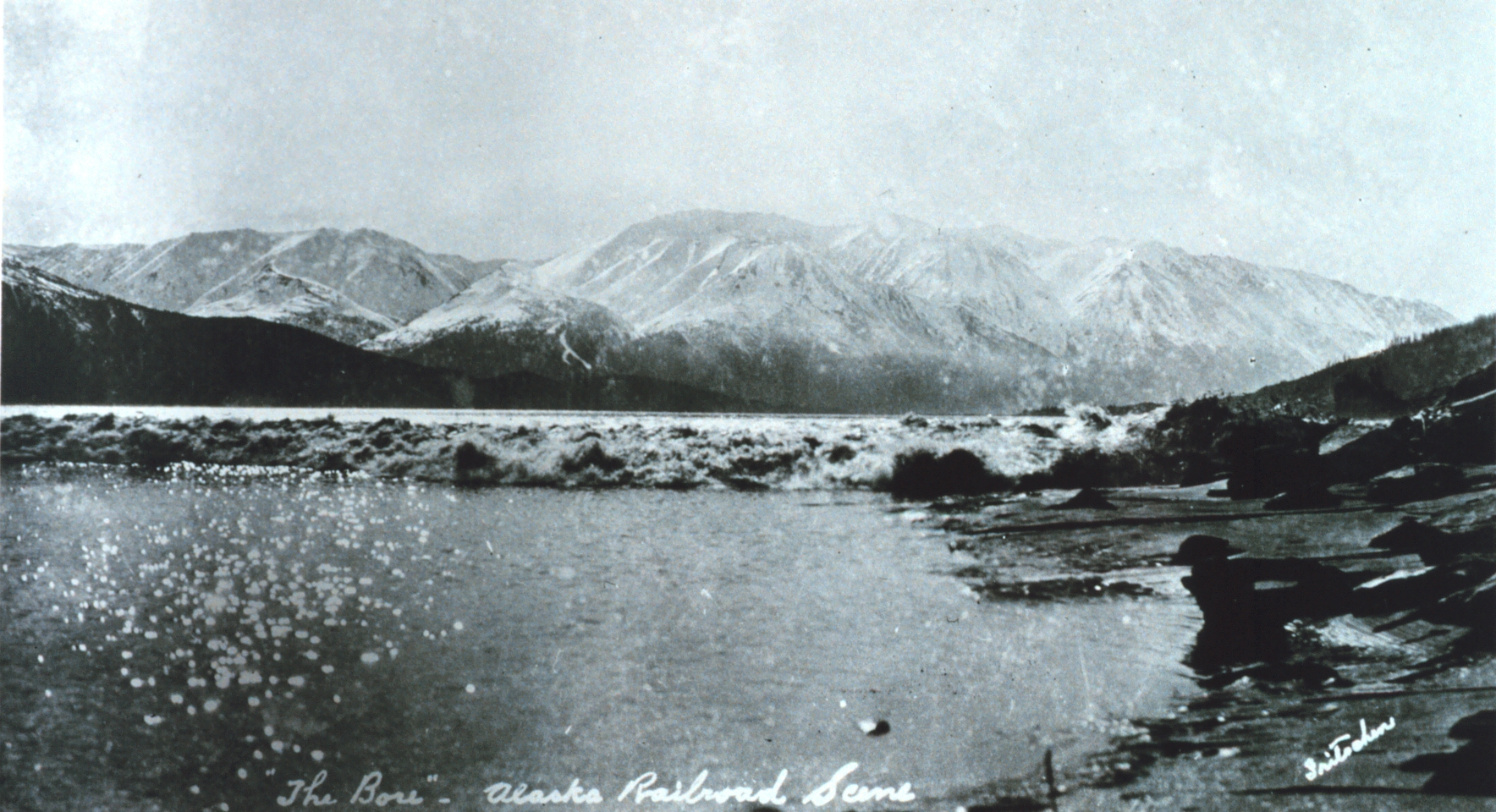
Turnagain bore.

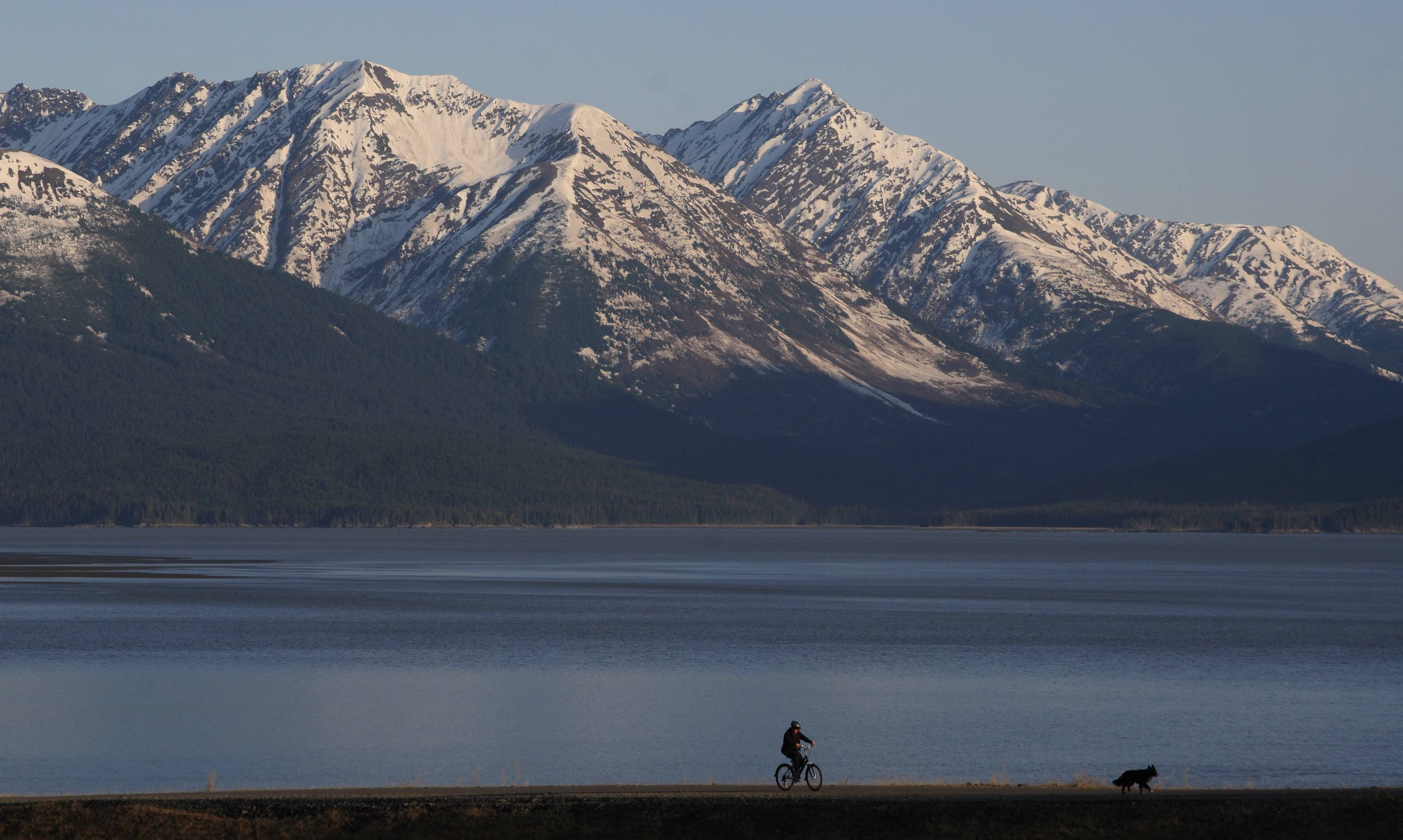
Turnagain Arm and Kenai Mountains.

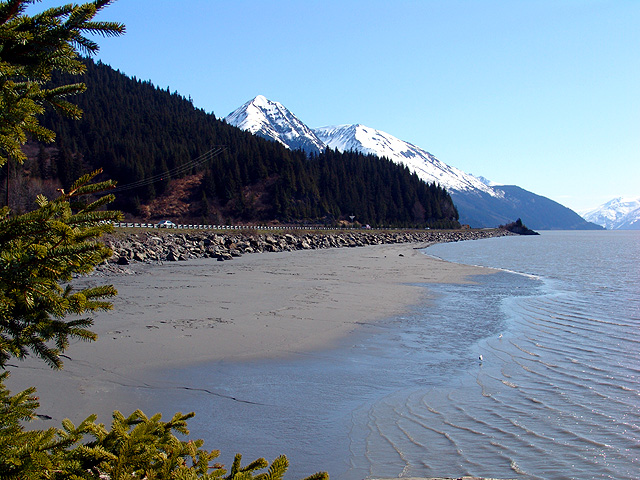
Turnagain Arm from Girdwood.

The region adjacent to Turnagain Arm is very rugged. South Yuyanq' Ch'ex is the tallest mountain rising from the north side of Turnagain, and Mount Alpenglow the highest on the south side. Mountains rise precipitously on both sides of the arm and reach altitudes of 5,000–6,000 feet (1,500–1,800 m). Their tops are ragged and bare. The timber rarely reaches higher than 1,500–2,000 feet (460–610 m). The smaller valleys are narrow and steep, but the larger ones frequently show by their U-shaped cross section the former presence of glaciers. Glaciers may be still seen at a number of places. Chief among them are Portage Glacier, occupying the Portage Valley between the head of Turnagain Arm and Passage Canal, the two neighboring glaciers which form the headwaters of the Glacier River and Twentymile River, Explorer Glacier, and Skookum Glacier. Besides these, there are several smaller ones on tributaries of Glacier Creek.

The Seward Highway follows a portion of the southern edge of the Chugach State Park along Turnagain Arm. Turnagain Arm boasts the second highest tides in North America after the Bay of Fundy. These tides, which can reach 40 feet (12 meters), come in so quickly that they produce a wave known as a bore tide. Adventurous kayakers and surfers have taken to riding the tide as an extreme sport. Hikers should take care not to get stuck in the quicksand-like mudflats that otherwise make up the beaches along Turnagain Arm.

Turnagain Arm communities within the Municipality of Anchorage include Indian, Bird, and Girdwood, all along the north shore of the Arm. Portage, at the eastern tip or head of the Arm, is a former settlement destroyed in the 1964 Alaska earthquake. Beluga Point Site, also known as ANC-054, is an archaeological location on the north shore of the Arm, while Alaska Wildlife Conservation Center is situated at the head of the Arm near the site of Portage.

== Tributaries ==
Major tributaries of Turnagain Arm include the Twentymile River, Portage River, and Placer River. Minor tributaries include Resurrection Creek, Bear Creek, Sixmile Creek, and Glacier Creek, with their branches. Resurrection Creek flows into the south side of the arm about 20 miles (32 km) east of the main body of Cook Inlet, and with Sixmile Creek, 8 miles (13 km) farther east; with its various branches, it drains a large part of the northeastern portion of Kenai Peninsula. Resurrection Creek flows in a direction slightly east of north. The town of Hope is located near its mouth. Palmer Creek is its largest tributary.

Bear Creek flows into Turnagain Arm 0.5 miles (0.80 km) east of the mouth of Resurrection Creek. It is nearly 6 miles (9.7 km) long, and follows a northwesterly course through a steep, narrow valley. Bear and Palmer creeks are the two producing streams of this part of the field, and both are connected with Hope by roads.

The drainage area of Sixmile Creek is much larger than that of Resurrection Creek, and the stream is formed by the confluence of two large branches, which unite 10 miles (16 km) south of Sunrise, the mining camp at its mouth. The larger of the two forks, known as the East Fork, is itself formed by the confluence of a number of small streams. The more important of these are Gulch and Granite creeks on the north, and Lynx and Silvertip creeks on the south. The smaller fork, Canyon Creek, flows almost directly northward and, with its eastern tributary, Mills Creek, has been the chief producer of the Turnagain Arm field.

Glacier Creek enters Turnagain Arm from the north, 12 miles (19 km) from its eastern end. It is one of the larger tributaries of Turnagain Arm from the north and joins the Arm at a point 75 miles (121 km) from Seward by way of the Alaska Northern Railroad survey.

== History ==
The Dena'ina called Turnagain Arm Tutl'uh, meaning "back water" or "headwaters".

Cook spent ten days exploring the inlet named after him. He first sent William Bligh to scout the north arm, where he met with the Dena'ina Natives of the Eklutna area, who told him the name of the Knik Arm and that it was not the Northwest Passage, but rather an outlet for two rivers (the Knik and Matanuska Rivers). Cook then sailed south to scout the other arm, and in a bad mood after running the Resolution aground on a sandbar on his way back out of the shallow waters, called it "River Turnagain", having found no sign of the passage there either.

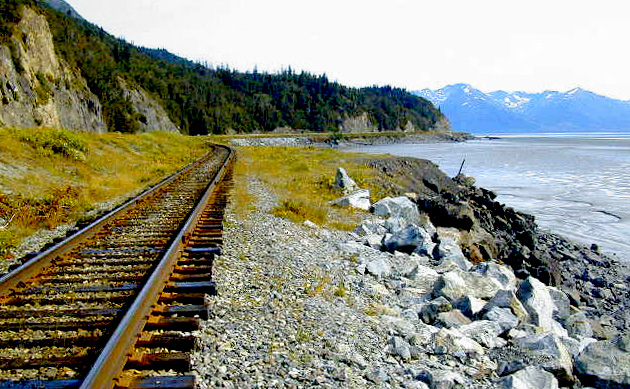
Alaska Railroad at Turnagain Arm

The mineral resources of the Turnagain-Knik region are notable for gold placers and the gold quartz lodes. From 1896 to 1898, a large number of placer claims were staked on the streams tributary to Turnagain Arm from the north, and on a few of these claims, notably those on lower Crow Creek, mining was carried out in subsequent years. The output of placer gold was derived from the Turnagain Arm slope of the mountains. Development work on gold quartz lodes was confined largely to the Turnagain Arm basin.

== Geology ==
The eastern portion of Kenai Peninsula and the region about the head of Turnagain Arm present a succession of rocks, which as a whole are of remarkably uniform appearance and composition. They are of sedimentary origin and consist chiefly of fine-grained gray and bluish-black slates and gray arkoses. Interstratified with these, but in far less amount, are quartzose beds and occasional thin conglomerates. In a few places north of Turnagain Arm this series of rocks, called by Mendenhall "the Sunrise series", is cut by dikes of igneous rock of an aplitic or granitic character. These igneous rocks were not found in the region immediately south of the arm. The whole rock succession is closely folded, and the arkoses as well as the slates show cleavage, which is, however, much more perfectly developed in the slates. Immense deposits of gravel occur at a number of localities, but are especially noticeable in the valleys of Sixmile Creek, Resurrection Creek, and Kenai River. The flat-topped benches have an elevation of nearly 1,000 feet (300 m) above sea level around the lower end of Kenai Lake, and the same elevation was observed in the valleys of the streams mentioned. The bench gravels show a thickness of 100–200 feet (30–61 m) in the upper valleys, where they have been cut through by the streams. Evidences of a former period of glacial activity are seen on all sides in broad-bottomed U-shaped valleys, polished rock surfaces, and transported boulders. The shores of Turnagain Arm afford frequent proof of ice action in glacial markings and striated pebbles. Hanging valleys are not uncommon.

== Flora and fauna ==
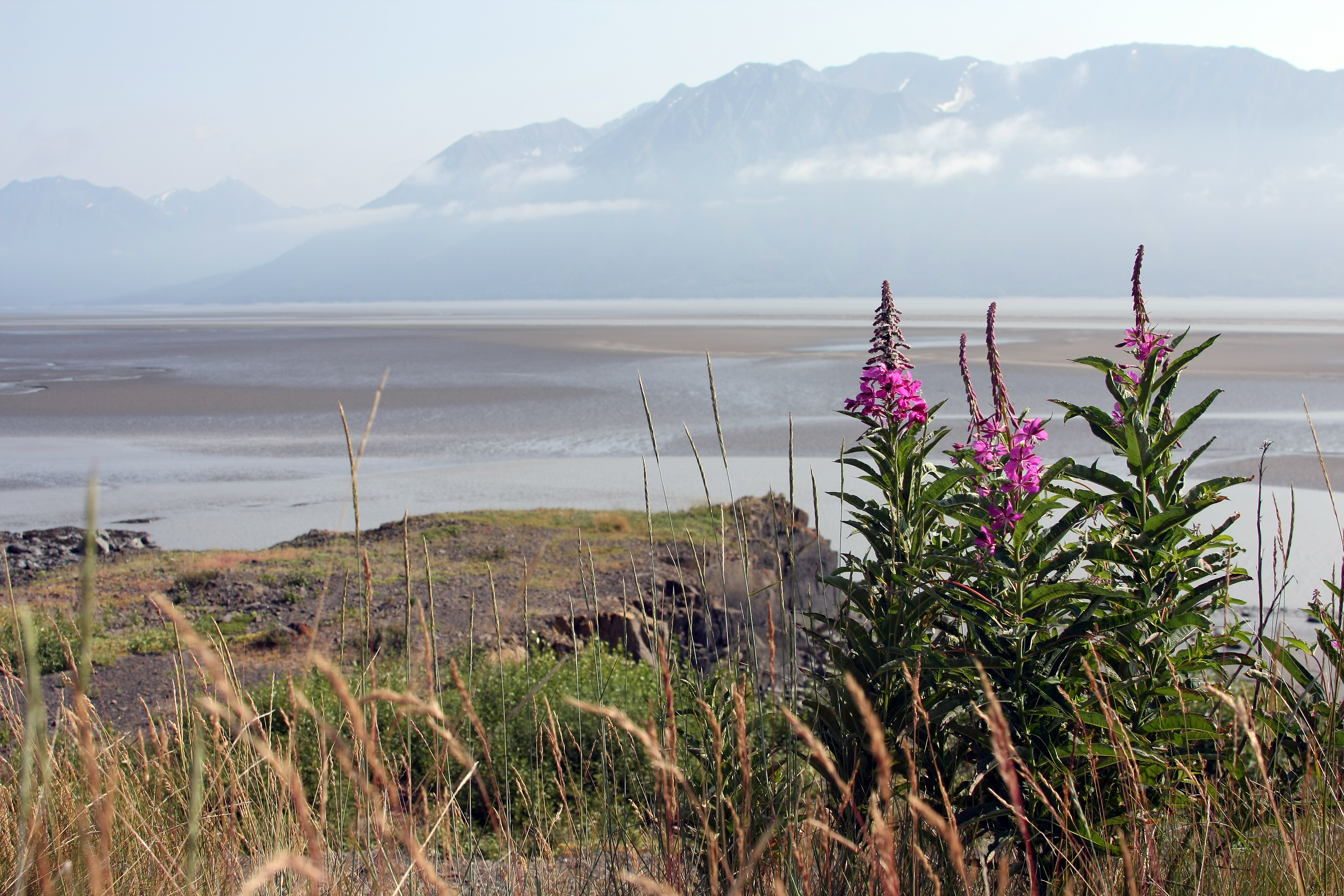
Epilobium angustifolium at Turnagain Arm

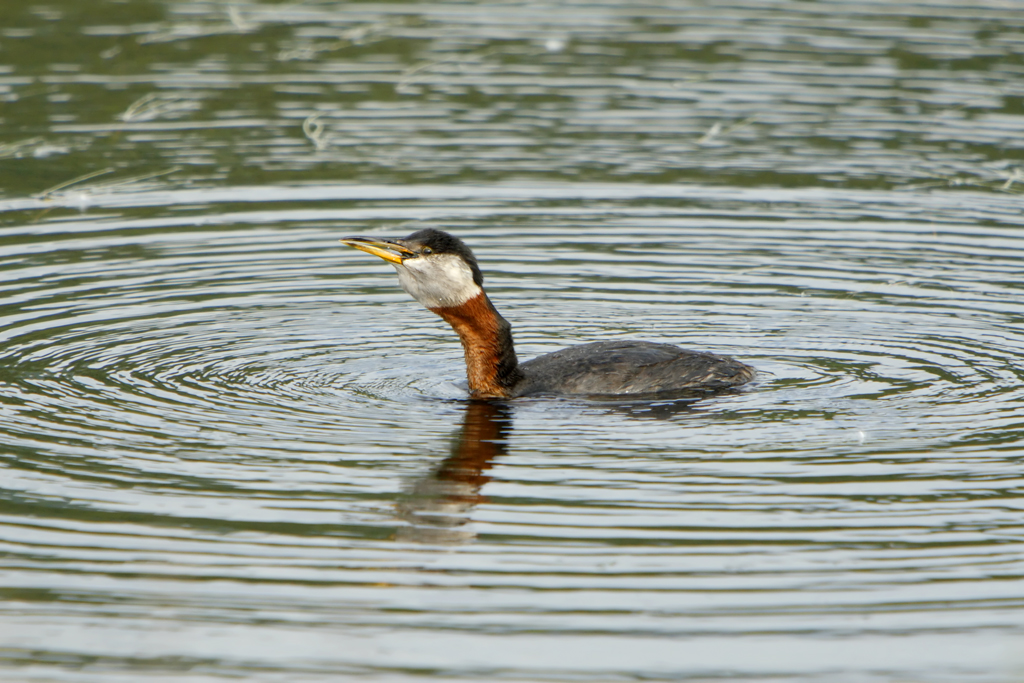
Red-necked grebe with a fish in its throat on Turnagain Arm

The east shore along the Kenai Peninsula, from the mouth of Turnagain Arm nearly to Kachemak Bay, is low and comparatively flat, but is for the most part heavily wooded. The flora of the mountainous district about Turnagain Arm is different from that of the coastal plains of other parts of the inlet. The low country near Hope consists of a grassy tide flat, about 50 acres in extent, and a few miles of forest and occasional small swamps along the lower part of Resurrection Creek. Balsam poplars, paper birches, alders, and willows abound near the streams, and spruces (Picea canadensis and Picea sitchensis) and hemlocks (Tsuga mertensiana) are common on the slopes and slightly elevated flats. A third species of spruce (Picea mariana) is found in the small peat bogs, along with smaller Hudsonian plants. (Ledum), crowberry (Empetrum), and dwarf birch (Betula glandulosa) are in profusion. Of the larger trees, the hemlock is abundant, but it is exceeded in individual size by the spruces. The conifers ascend the mountain slopes to about 2,000 feet (610 m) but above that point rapidly disappear. Beyond this elevation are alder thickets, small patches of dwarf willows and birches, and vast stretches of waving grass from 1–3 feet (0.30–0.91 m) high.

Still higher, the slopes and rounded backs of the ridges are cushioned with a mass of heather and heather-like shrubs, chiefly Empetrum nigrum. This extends up to an approximate altitude of 5,000 feet (1,500 m), above which there is very little or no plant growth. The whole country is characterized by the abundance of high grass; otherwise it is a typical Hudsonian-Alpine region.

Dall sheep, hoary marmot, American black bear, American marten, and black-capped chickadee are noted. An endangered population of Beluga Whales are commonly seen traversing the waterway with rising and falling tides.

On May 3, 2019, a Falcated Duck was spotted at Potter Marsh, a first for the area and the whole state of Alaska. The last sighting was on May 4, 2019

== See also ==
- Kenai Mountains – Turnagain Arm National Heritage Area
