= Raggedtop Mountain =

Mountain in Alaska, United States

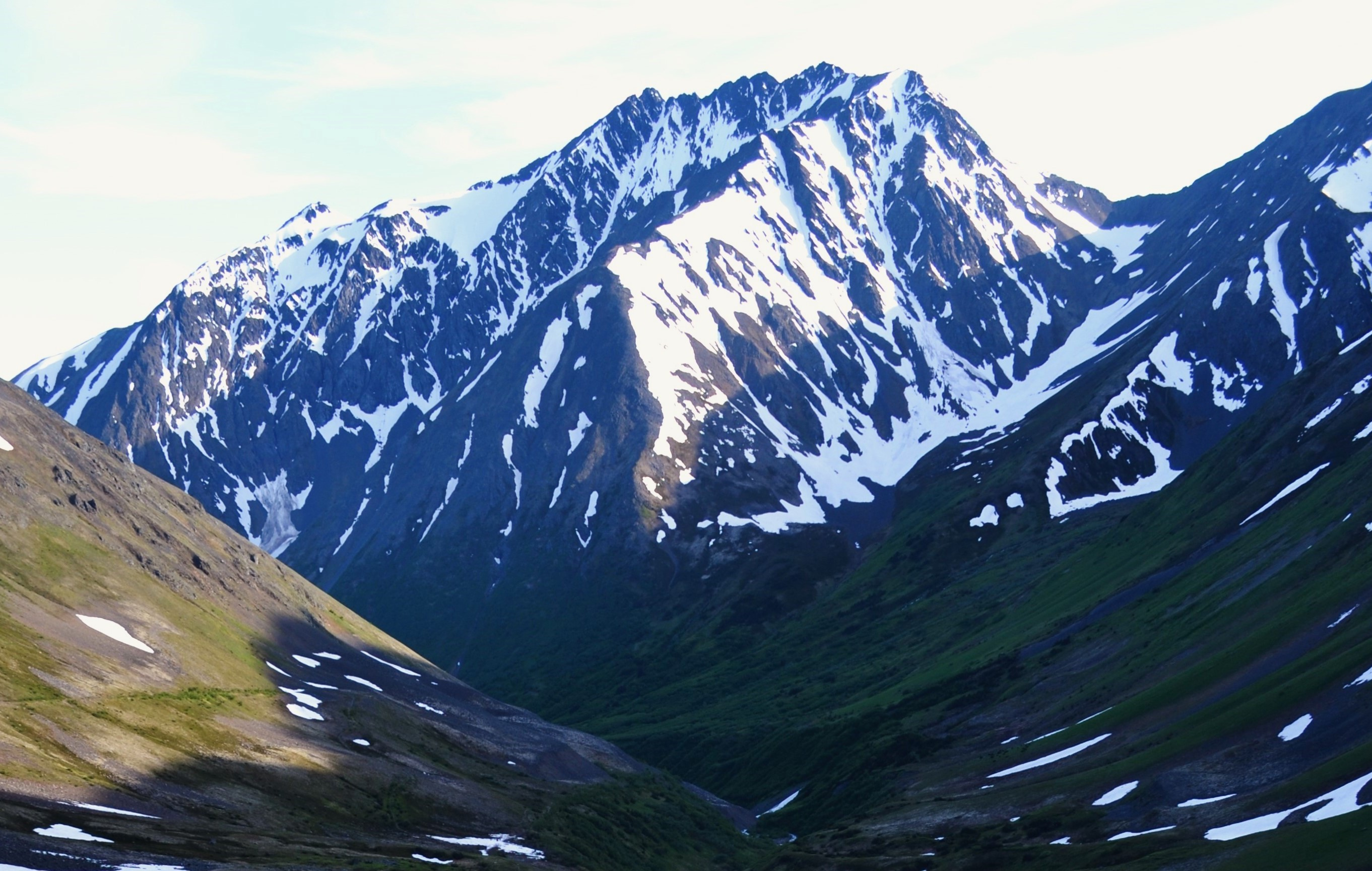
- North aspect

Highest point
- Elevation: 5,215 ft (1,590 m)
- Prominence: 965 ft (294 m)
- Parent peak: Magpie Peak (5,812 ft)
- Isolation: 1.77 mi (2.85 km)
- Coordinates: 61°00′58″N 149°08′40″W

Geography
- Location within Alaska
- Interactive map of Raggedtop Mountain
- Location: Municipality of Anchorage
- Country: United States
- State: Alaska
- Protected area: Chugach National Forest
- Parent range: Chugach Mountains
- Topo map: USGS Anchorage A-6

Raggedtop Mountain is a 5,215-foot-elevation (1,590-meter) mountain summit in Alaska, United States.

== Description ==
Raggedtop Mountain is located 28 miles (45 km) southeast of Anchorage and five miles (8.0 km) north of Girdwood in the Chugach Mountains on land managed by Chugach National Forest. Precipitation runoff from the mountain drains into Crow Creek → Glacier Creek → Turnagain Arm. Topographic relief is significant as the summit rises 4,000 feet (1,219 m) above Crow Creek in 1.5 miles (2.4 km). The mountain was so named by the U.S. Geological Survey in 1932 because of the very rugged topography on the mountain top, and the toponym was officially adopted the same year by the U.S. Board on Geographic Names.

== Climate ==
Based on the Köppen climate classification, Raggedtop Mountain is located in a subarctic climate zone with long, cold, snowy winters, and cool summers. Weather systems coming off the Gulf of Alaska are forced upwards by the Chugach Mountains (orographic lift), causing heavy precipitation in the form of rainfall and snowfall. Winter temperatures can drop below −10 °F with wind chill factors below −20 °F. This climate supports three small snow fields on the slopes and the Alyeska ski area four miles (6.4 km) to the south-southeast.

== Gallery ==
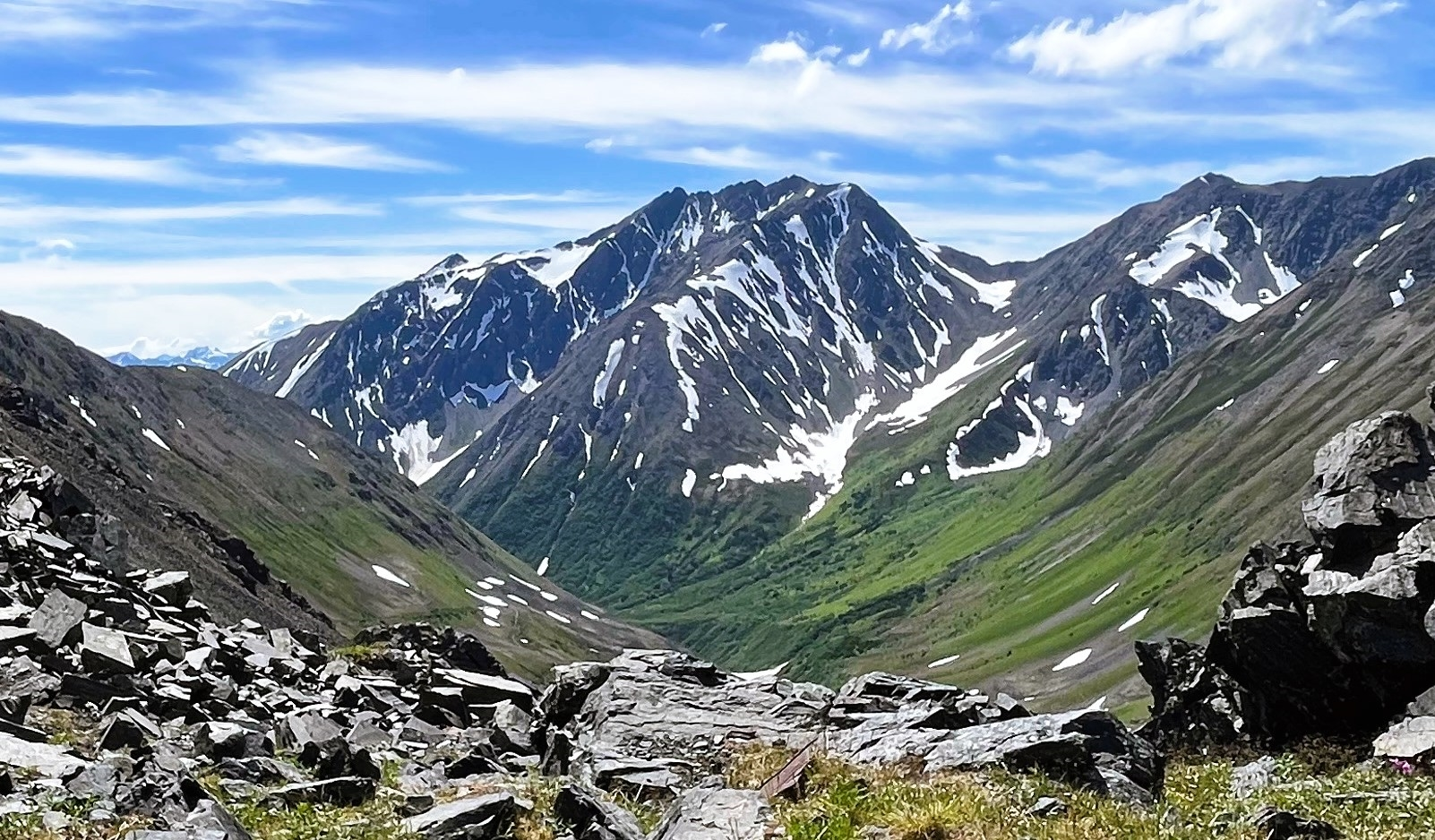
North aspect

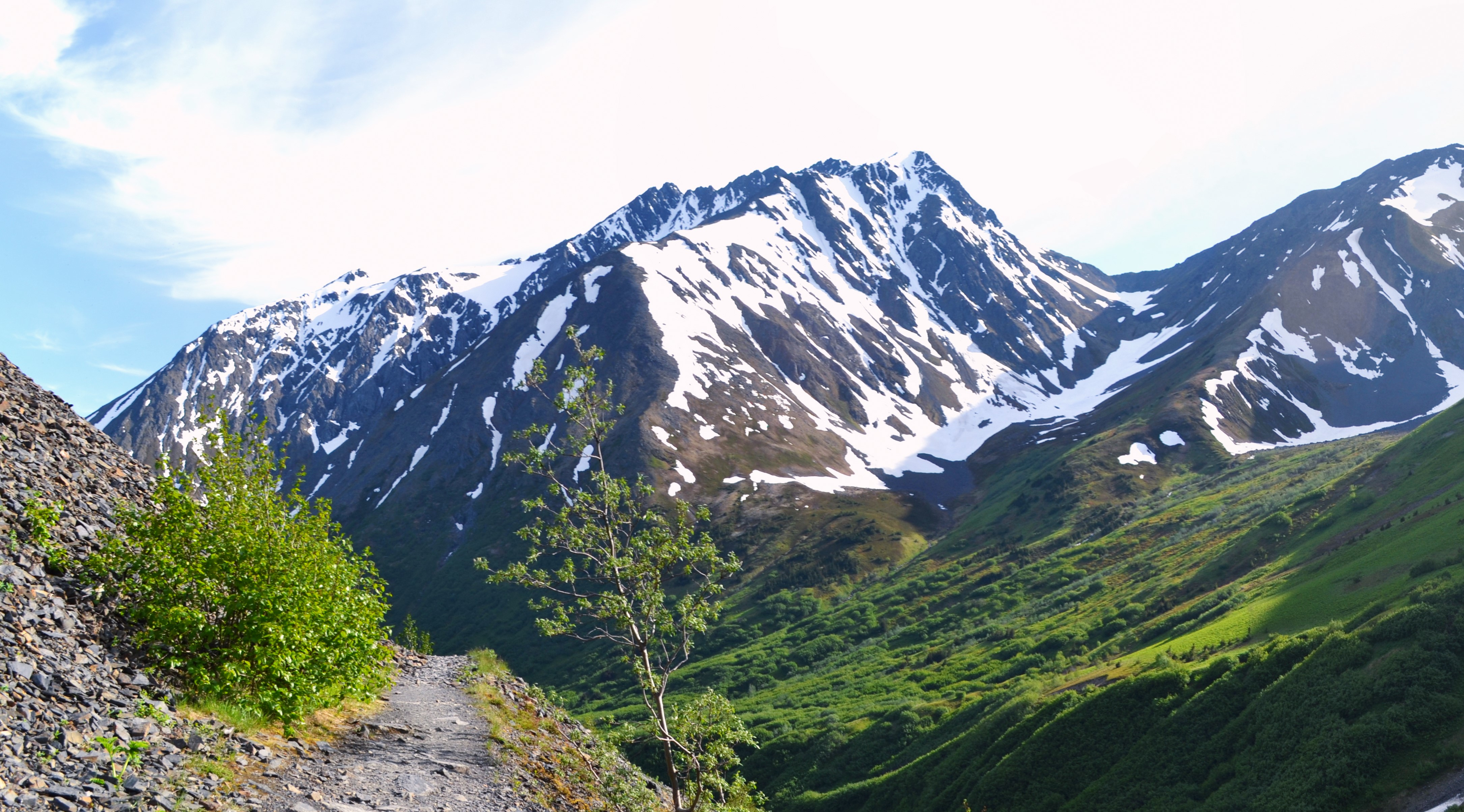
Raggedtop from Crow Pass area

== See also ==
- List of mountain peaks of Alaska
- Geography of Alaska
