= Goat Mountain (Alaska) =

Mountain in Alaska, U.S.

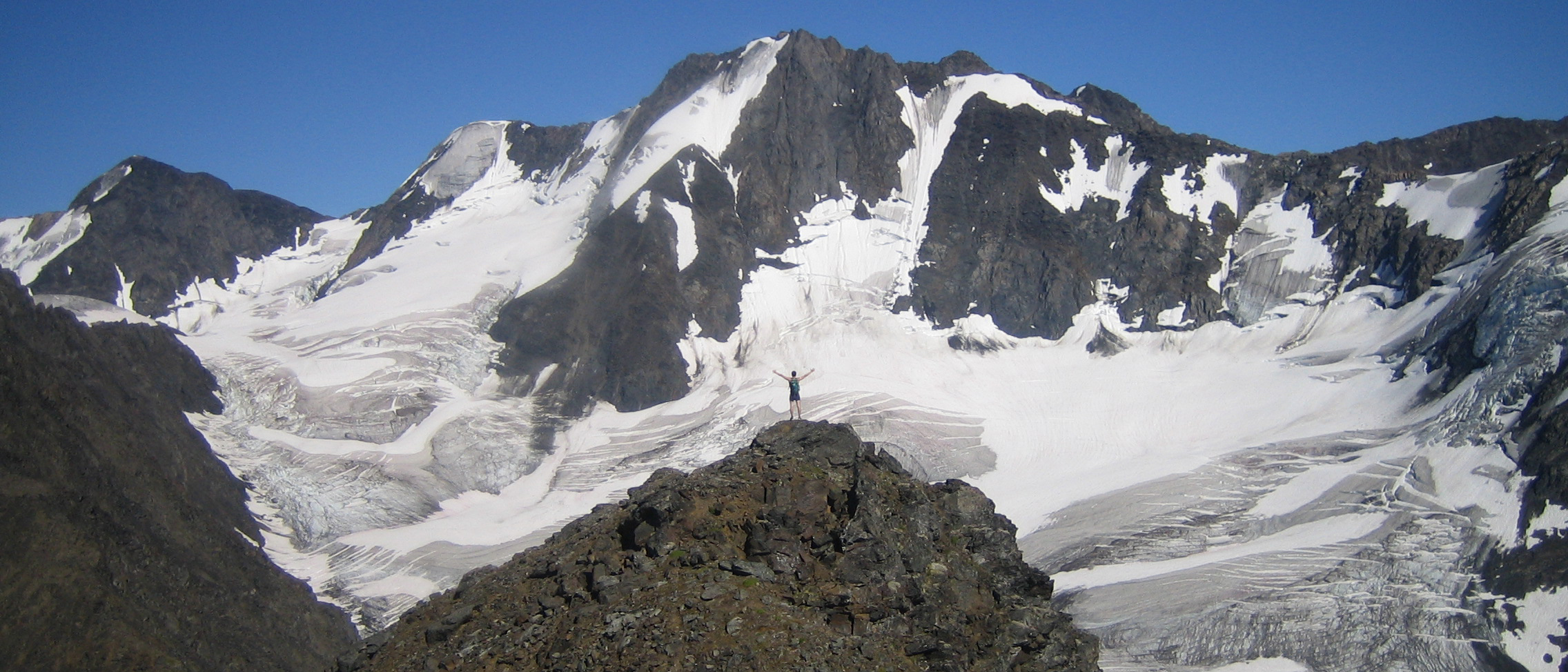
- West aspect, from Jewel Mountain

Highest point
- Elevation: 6,450 ft (1,966 m)
- Prominence: 100 ft (30 m)
- Parent peak: South Raven Peak
- Coordinates: 61°02′55″N 149°03′27″W

Geography
- Location within Alaska
- Interactive map of Goat Mountain
- Country: United States
- State: Alaska
- Borough: Anchorage
- Protected area: Chugach National Forest
- Parent range: Chugach Mountains
- Topo map: USGS Anchorage A-6

Goat Mountain is a 6,450-foot (1,966 m) mountain summit located in the Chugach Mountains, in Anchorage Municipality in the U.S. state of Alaska. The peak is situated in Chugach National Forest at the head of Glacier Creek Valley, 30 mi (48 km) east-southeast of downtown Anchorage, and 8 mi (13 km) north-northeast of the Alyeska Resort and Girdwood area. The mountain's name was officially adopted in 1932. On August 4, 2019, a small airplane crashed on the mountain claiming all four lives on board.

== Climate ==
Based on the Köppen climate classification, Goat Mountain is located in a subarctic climate zone with long, cold, snowy winters, and mild summers. Weather systems coming off the Gulf of Alaska are forced upwards by the Chugach Mountains (orographic lift), causing heavy precipitation in the form of rainfall and snowfall. Winter temperatures can drop below −10 °F with wind chill factors below −20 °F. This climate supports the massive Eagle Glacier on the east aspect of the peak, the Milk Glacier on the western slope, and the Raven Glacier to the northwest.

== Gallery ==
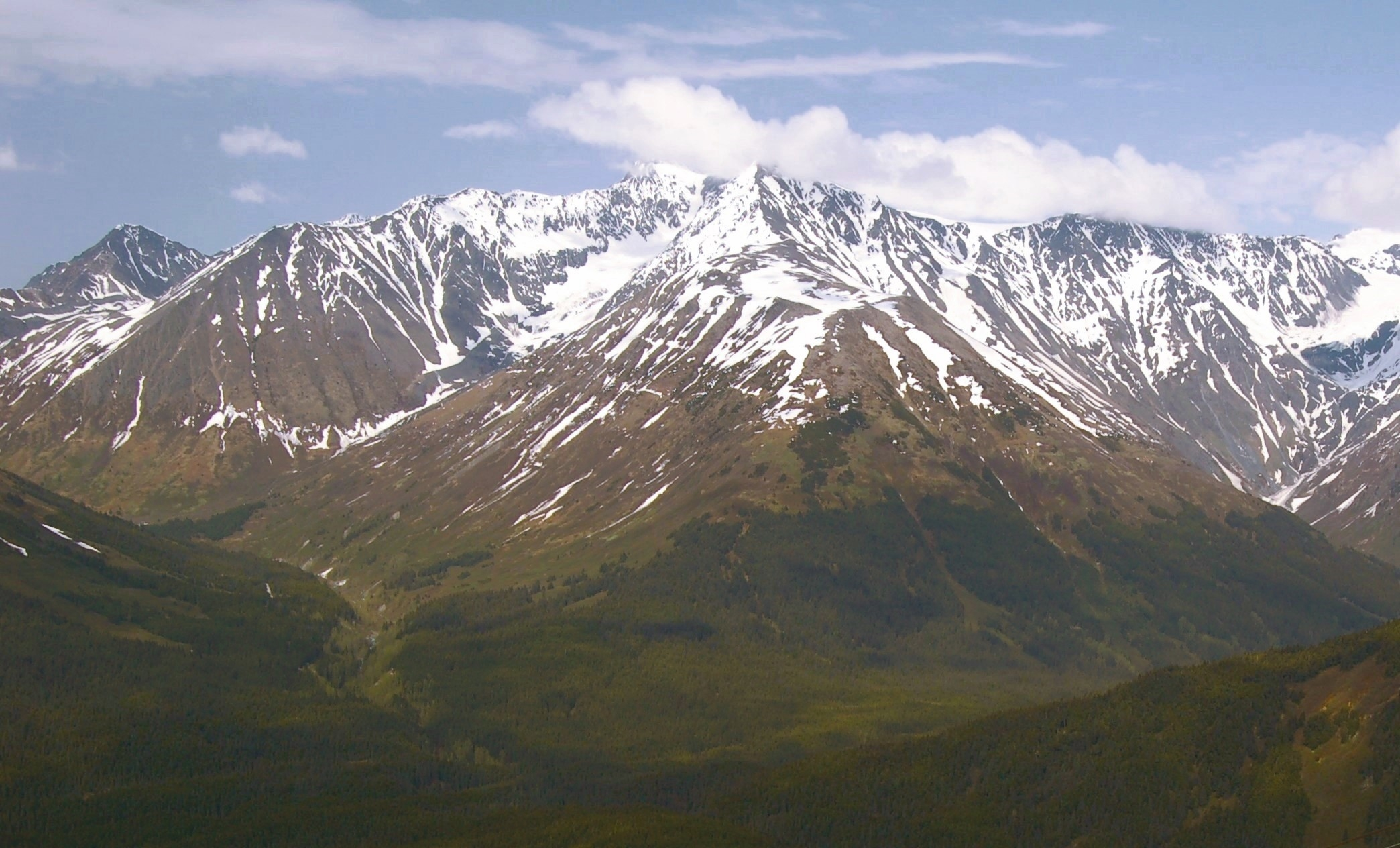
South aspect, from Alyeska ski area

== See also ==
- List of mountain peaks of Alaska
- Geology of Alaska
