= Lingon Mountain =

Mountain in Alaska, U.S.

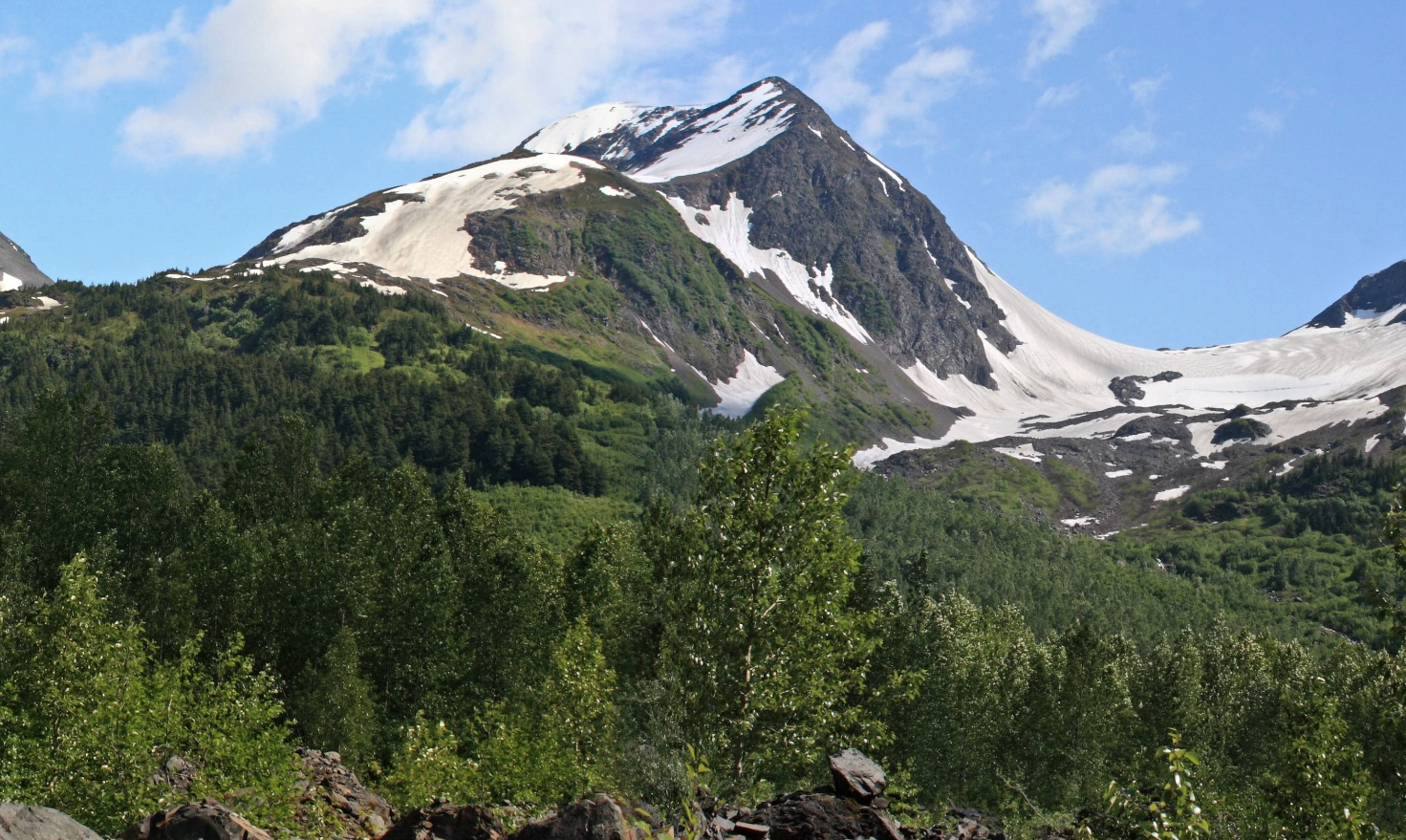
- Lingon Mountain, west aspect

Highest point
- Elevation: 4,098 ft (1,249 m)
- Prominence: 941 ft (287 m)
- Parent peak: Highbush Peak
- Isolation: 0.99 mi (1.59 km)
- Coordinates: 60°57′05″N 148°58′24″W

Geography
- Location within Alaska
- Interactive map of Lingon Mountain
- Location: Chugach National Forest; Anchorage Municipality, Alaska; United States
- Parent range: Chugach Mountains
- Topo map: USGS Seward D-6

Lingon Mountain is a 4,098-foot (1,249 m) elevation mountain summit located in the Chugach Mountains, in Anchorage Municipality in the U.S. state of Alaska. The peak is situated in Chugach National Forest, between the Glacier Creek and Twentymile River valleys, 36 mi (58 km) southeast of downtown Anchorage, and 5 mi (8 km) east of the Alyeska Resort and Girdwood areas. Precipitation runoff from the peak drains into Turnagain Arm. This mountain's unofficial name refers to the lingonberry. Other berry-theme peaks nearby include Highbush Peak, Lowbush Peak, Nagoon Mountain, Blueberry Hill, and Bearberry Point.

== Climate ==
Based on the Köppen climate classification, Lingon Mountain is located in a subarctic climate zone with long, cold, snowy winters, and mild summers. Weather systems coming off the Gulf of Alaska are forced upwards by the Chugach Mountains (orographic lift), causing heavy precipitation in the form of rainfall and snowfall. Winter temperatures can drop below −20 °C with wind chill factors below −30 °C. This climate supports a small unnamed glacier on its south slope. The months May through June offer the most favorable weather for climbing or viewing.

== Gallery ==
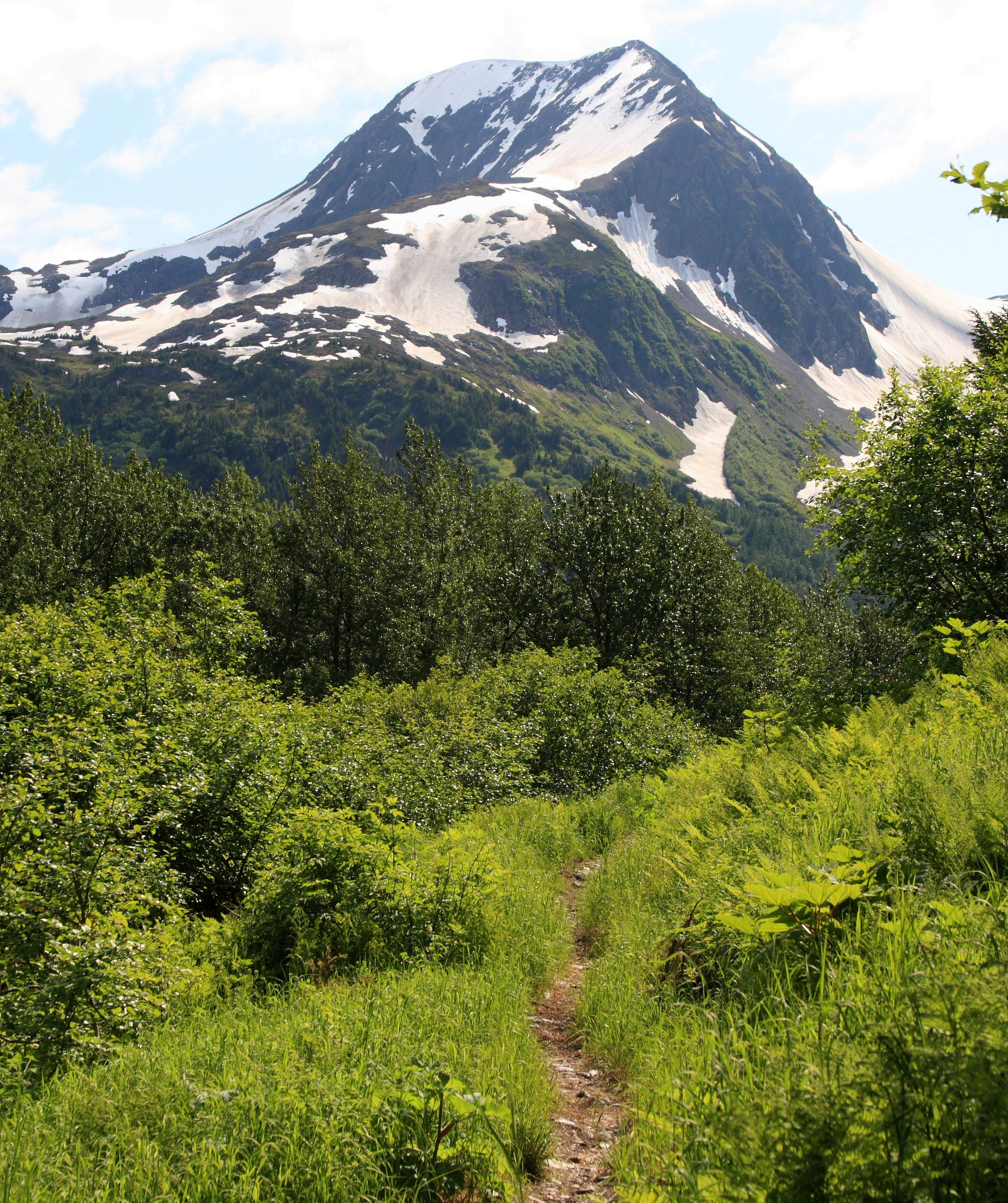

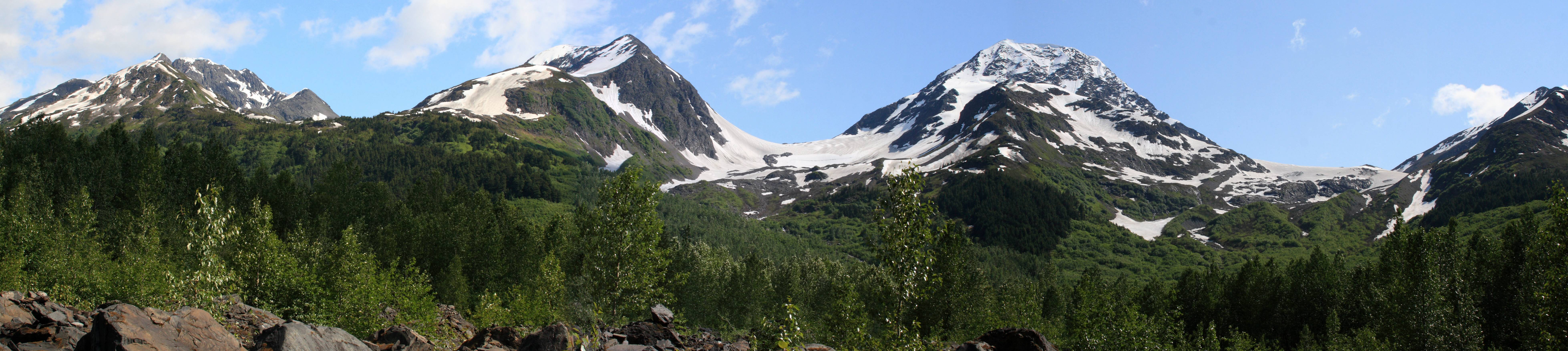
Nagoon Mountain, Lingon Mountain, and Highbush Peak from the Upper Winner Creek trail

== See also ==
- List of mountain peaks of Alaska
- Geology of Alaska
