= Highbush Peak =

Mountain in Alaska, U.S.

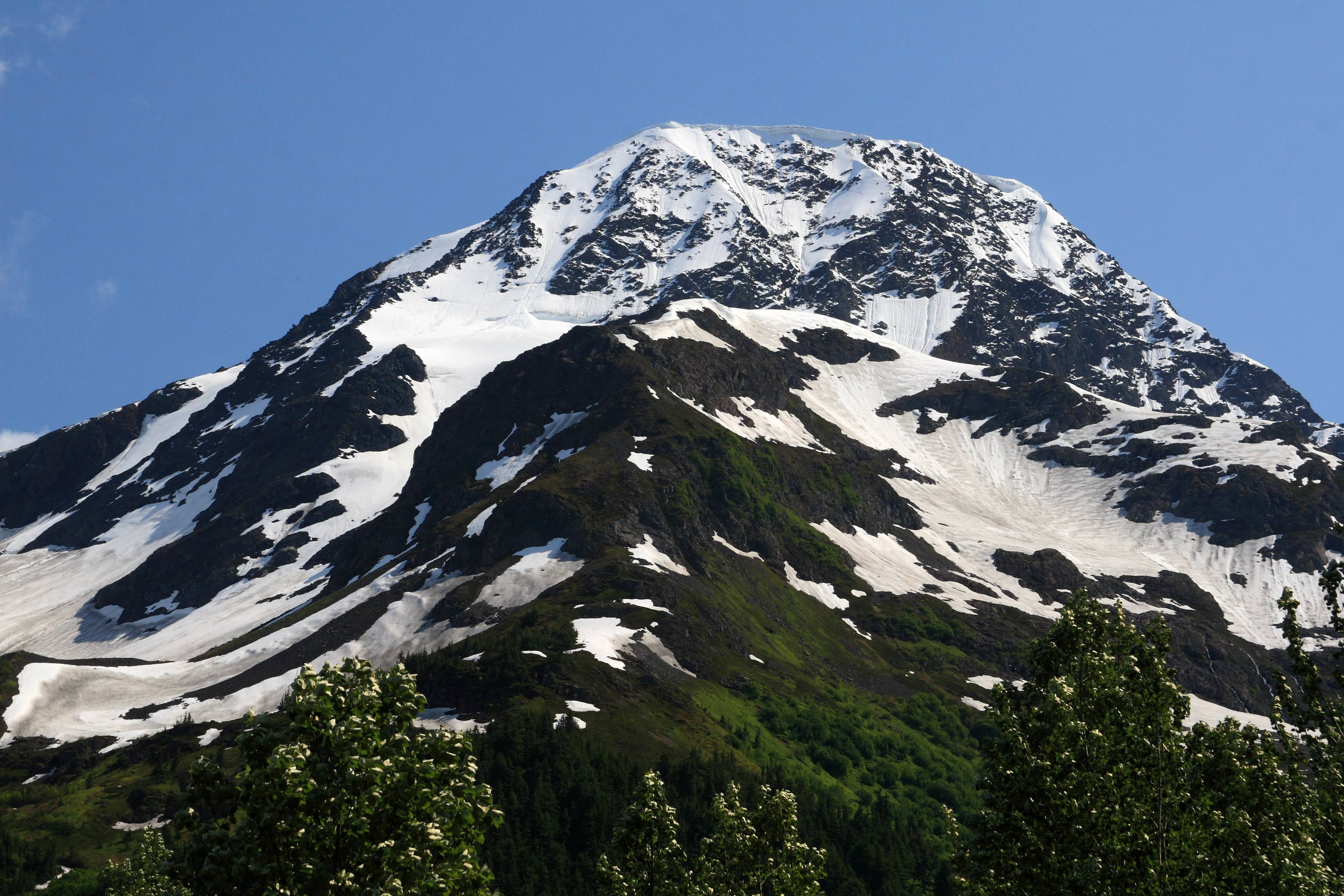
- Highbush Peak, northwest aspect

Highest point
- Elevation: 4,669 ft (1,423 m)
- Prominence: 2,733 ft (833 m)
- Parent peak: Mystery Mountain
- Isolation: 4.23 mi (6.81 km)
- Coordinates: 60°56′23″N 148°59′26″W

Geography
- Location within Alaska
- Interactive map of Highbush Peak
- Location: Chugach National Forest; Anchorage Municipality, Alaska; United States
- Parent range: Chugach Mountains
- Topo map: USGS Seward D-6

Highbush Peak is a 4,669-foot (1,423 m) elevation mountain summit located in the Chugach Mountains, in Anchorage Municipality in the U.S. state of Alaska. The peak is situated in Chugach National Forest, between the Glacier Creek and Twentymile River valleys, 36 mi (58 km) southeast of downtown Anchorage, and 5 mi (8 km) east of the Alyeska Resort and Girdwood area. Precipitation runoff from the peak drains into Turnagain Arm. This mountain's unofficial name refers to the highbush cranberry. Other berry-theme peaks nearby include Lowbush Peak, Lingon Mountain, Nagoon Mountain, Blueberry Hill, and Bearberry Point.

== Climate ==
Based on the Köppen climate classification, Highbush Peak is located in a subarctic climate zone with long, cold, snowy winters, and mild summers. Temperatures can drop below −20 °C with wind chill factors below −30 °C. This climate supports a small unnamed glacier on its east slope.

== Gallery ==
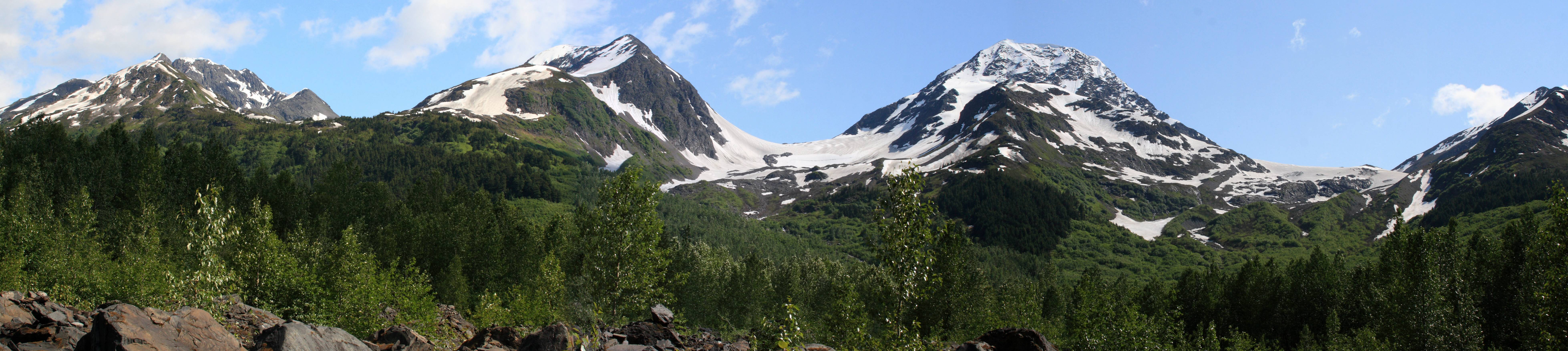
Nagoon Mountain, Lingon Mountain, and Highbush Peak from upper Winner Creek trail

== See also ==
- List of mountain peaks of Alaska
- Geology of Alaska
