= Jewel Mountain =

Mountain in Alaska, United States

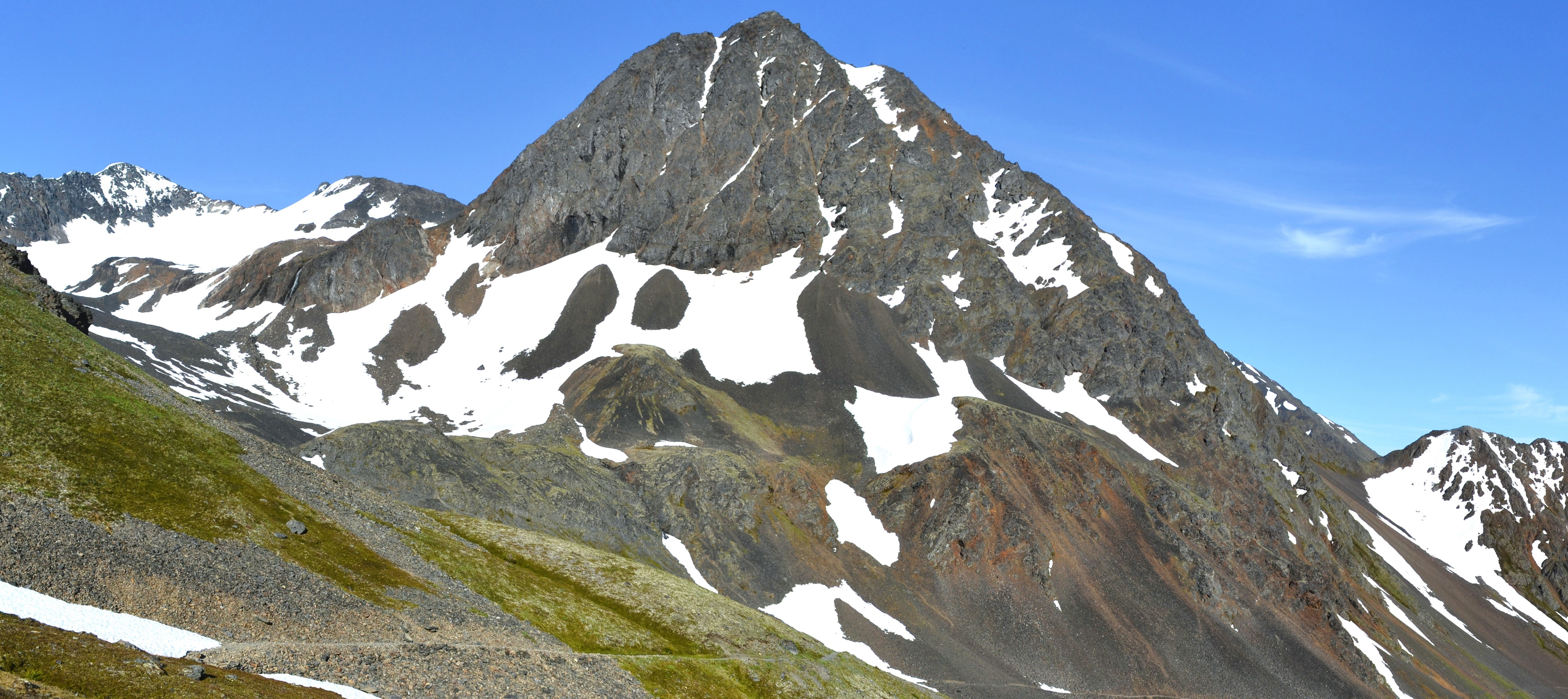
- Northwest aspect

Highest point
- Elevation: 4,885 ft (1,489 m)
- Prominence: 300 ft (91 m)
- Parent peak: South Raven Peak (6,550 ft)
- Isolation: 1.46 mi (2.35 km)
- Coordinates: 61°02′58″N 149°05′58″W

Geography
- Location within Alaska
- Location: Municipality of Anchorage
- Country: United States
- State: Alaska
- Protected area: Chugach National Forest
- Parent range: Chugach Mountains
- Topo map: USGS Anchorage A-6

Climbing
- Easiest route: Hiking class 2

Jewel Mountain is a 4,885-foot-elevation (1,489-meter) mountain summit in Alaska, United States.

== Description ==
Jewel Mountain is located 29 miles (47 km) southeast of Anchorage and 7.5 miles (12.1 km) north of Girdwood in the Chugach Mountains, on land managed by Chugach National Forest. Precipitation runoff from the mountain drains into Crow Creek → Glacier Creek → Turnagain Arm. Topographic relief is significant as the summit rises approximately 1,800 feet (550 m) above Crow Creek in 0.4 miles (0.64 km). The Iditarod National Historic Trail traverses the west slope of the mountain. The mountain's local name was reported by the Army Map Service in 1942, and the toponym has been officially adopted by the U.S. Board on Geographic Names.

== Climate ==
Based on the Köppen climate classification, Jewel Mountain is located in a subarctic climate zone with long, cold, snowy winters, and cool summers. Weather systems coming off the Gulf of Alaska are forced upwards by the Chugach Mountains (orographic lift), causing heavy precipitation in the form of rainfall and snowfall. Winter temperatures can drop below −10 °F with wind chill factors below −20 °F. This climate supports the Raven Glacier to the north, Milk Glacier to the east, and the Alyeska ski area six miles (9.7 km) to the south.

== See also ==
- List of mountain peaks of Alaska
- Geography of Alaska
