= Alyeska =

Alyeska may refer to:

- Alaska; Alyeska is an archaic spelling of the Aleut word Alaska meaning "mainland", "great country", or "great land"
- A former settlement, abandoned and merged with Girdwood, Anchorage, Alaska
- Alyeska Resort, an alpine ski area which developed in the early 1960s in Girdwood
- Alyeska Pipeline Service Company
