= Glacier Creek =

Glacier Creek may refer to either of two streams in Alaska:

- Glacier Creek (Turnagain Arm), a stream near the town of Girdwood
- Glacier Creek (Tustumena), a short stream that flows from Tustumena Glacier to Tustumena Lake
