= Crow Creek (Alaska) =

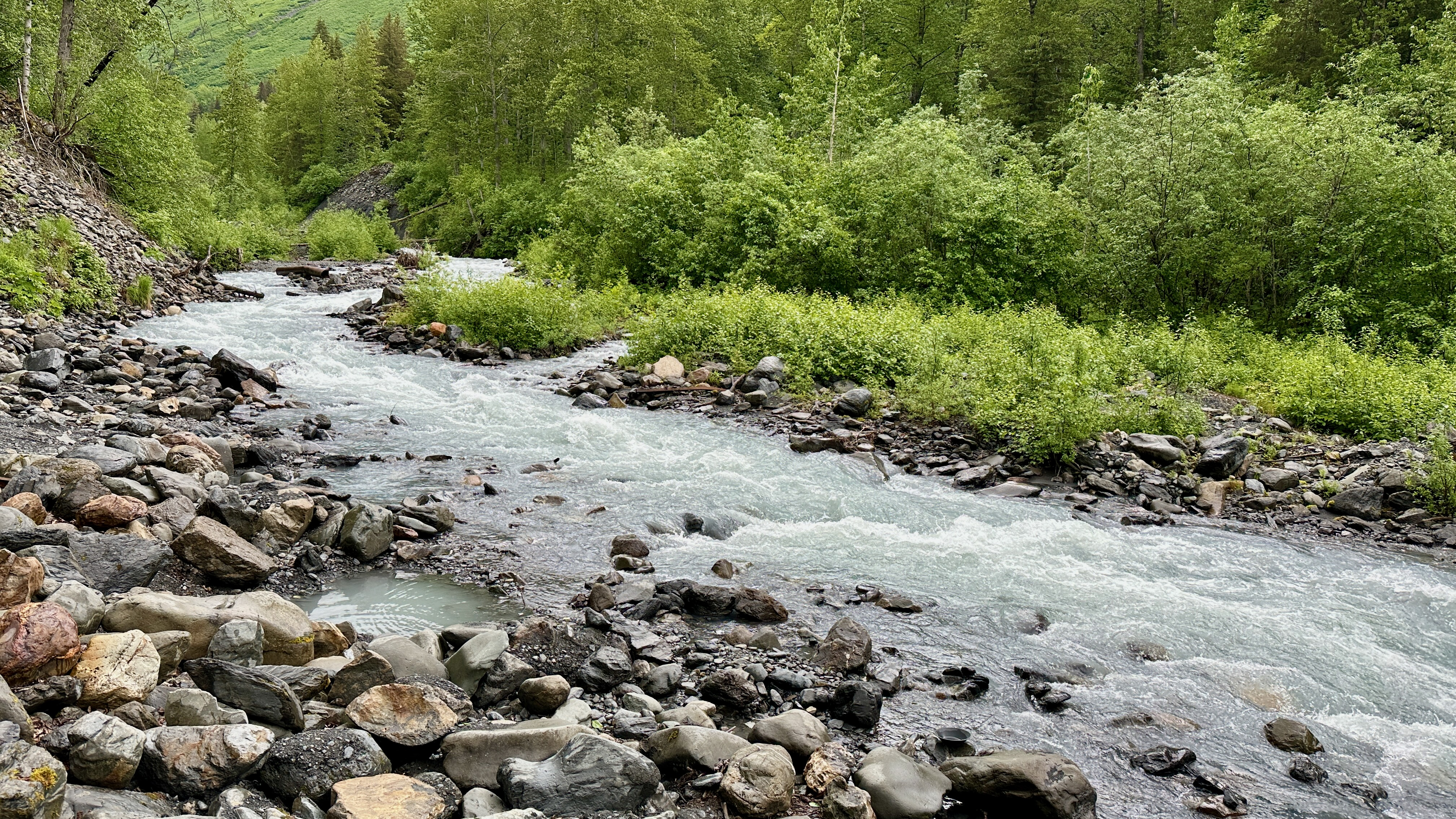
Crow Creek flowing by the Crow Creek Mine

Crow Creek is a stream in the Chugach Mountains, Alaska, US. It is the only notable tributary of Glacier Creek, which enters Turnagain Arm from the north, 12 miles (19 km) from its eastern end. The stream is notable as the site of ongoing gold mining since the late 19th century.

== Geography ==
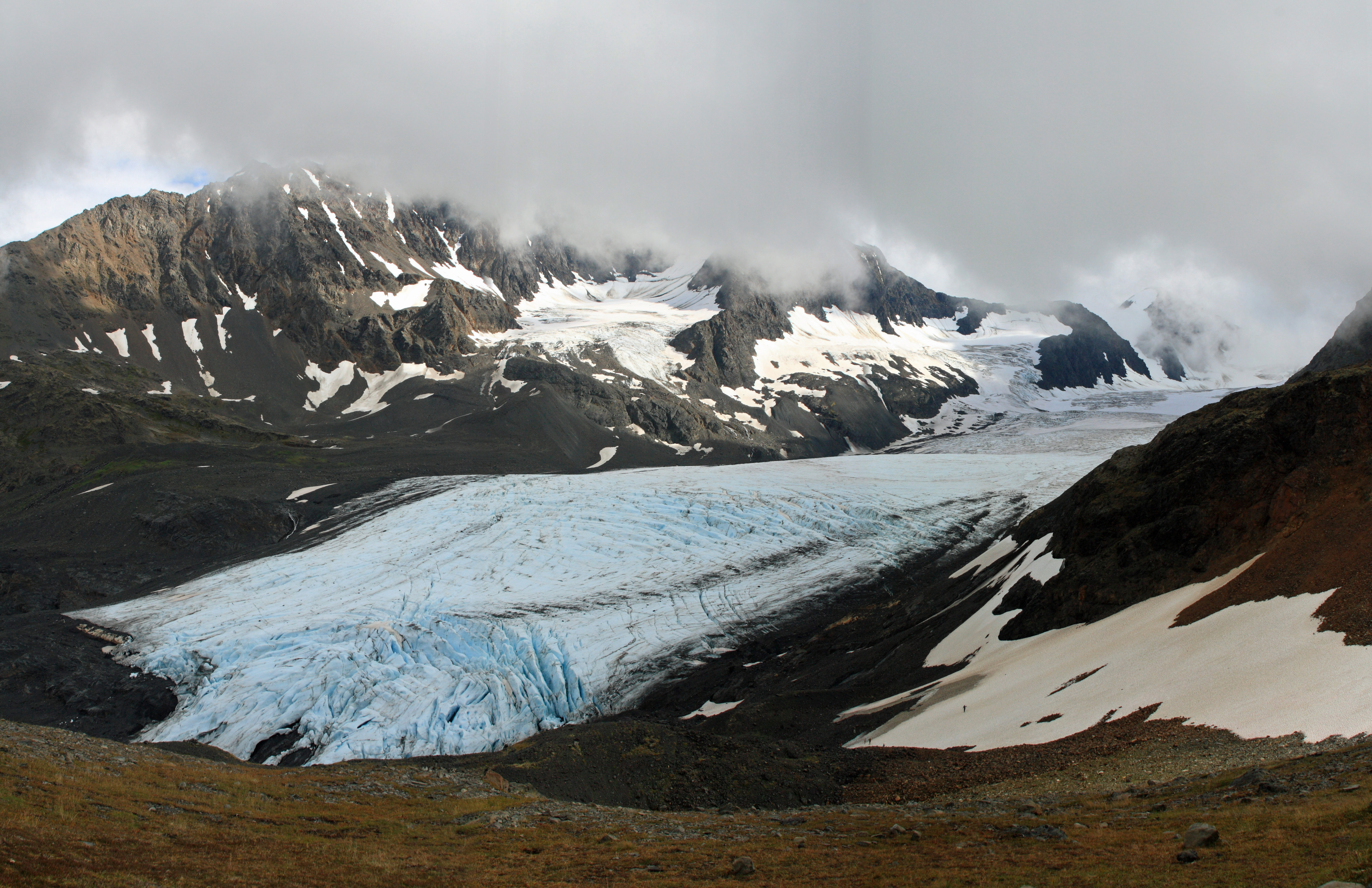
Raven Glacier from Crow Pass

Crow Creek is a tributary of Glacier Creek, about 5 miles (8.0 km) above its mouth. The latter flows into Turnagain Arm from the northern side. The mountains at its head are high and rugged and form the divide between the waters that flow to Turnagain Arm and those tributary to Knik Arm. They are broken at the head of Crow Creek by Crow Creek Pass at an altitude of about 3,400 feet (1,000 m), which affords a fairly good route from Crow Creek to Raven Creek, a tributary of Eagle River. From its source in the pass to its mouth, Crow Creek is about 5 miles (8.0 km) long. Near its head, it is precipitous, descending in waterfalls and rapids for a vertical distance of over 1,000 feet (300 m) within 1 mile (1.6 km) of the pass. It is fed by several small glaciers, and during the summer its waters are turbid. Below the pass the stream emerges from its narrow stream-cut gorge into a gravel-filled basin.

The basin is bordered at its lower end by a terminal moraine from a lateral valley, and the gravel fill is the result of the lessened gradient behind this morainal dam. Through its boulder-like channel across the moraine the stream descends in rapids, to emerge into a narrow gravel-floored valley bordered by benchlike terraces of gravel and snowing no rock outcrops. These conditions prevail to a point within half a mile of the mouth of the valley, where the stream enters a rock canyon, with nearly vertical walls, that extends to its mouth. Throughout the basin of Crow Creek, the bedrock consists predominantly of interbedded argillites or shales and graywackes, with some conglomerates, cut by numerous granitic dikes and sills. Locally, the shale beds have been metamorphosed, with the development of slaty cleavage, and in places the metamorphism has been intense enough to produce a somewhat schistose structure. The prevailing strike of the beds in this basin is northeast, but locally the beds diverge considerably from this general trend. Near the mouth of Crow Creek, they dip prevailingly at high angles to the southeast, but at the head of the valley folding has occurred, and the general trend of the structure swings around to an easterly direction.

== Physiography ==
The physiographic history of Crow Creek is highly complex, but the deep excavations made during the progress of mining have yielded much valuable information concerning it.

== Geologic history ==
During the general retreat of the ice following the intense glaciation of the region, the Crow and Glacier creek glaciers separated. The Crow Creek glacier retreated the more rapidly because of its smaller area of ice supply, but the Glacier Creek glacier retreated sufficiently to allow the escape of the Crow Creek waters, which cut a gorge of considerable depth in the bedrock. A later advance of the Glacier Creek glacier, accompanied probably by a slight advance of the Crow Creek glacier, pounded the Crow Creek waters with a resultant deposition of their load and the filling of the gorge and of part of the valley with water-laid sediments. With the final retreat of the glaciers to their present position, Crow Creek cut a new channel through the fluvioglacial deposits, deviating somewhat from its former channel and exposing the latter where the channels cross.

== Mining ==
- Crow Creek Consolidated Gold Mining Company
- U.S. National Register of Historic Places
- Alaska Heritage Resources Survey
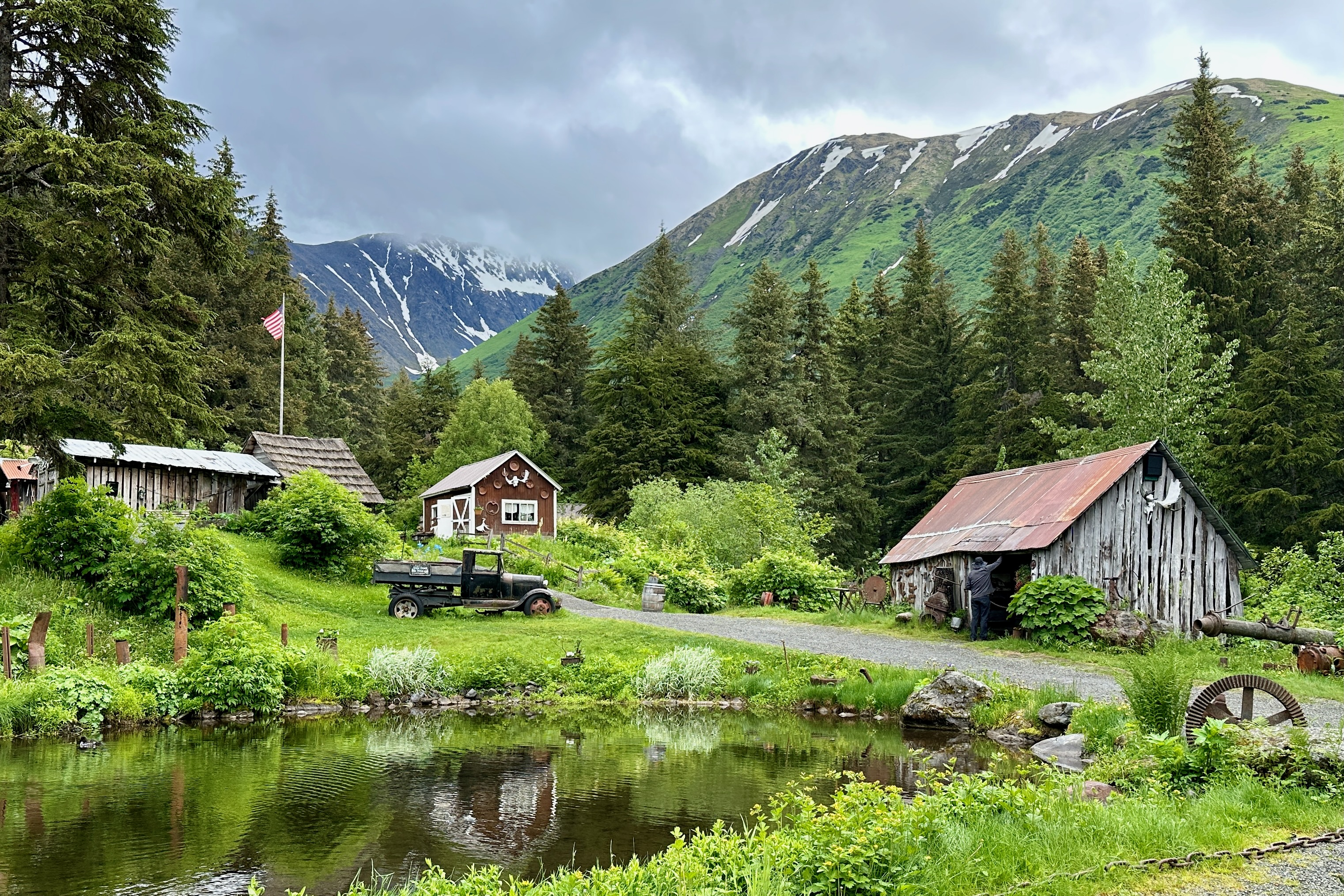
- The Crow Creek Mine is located at mile 0.3 of Crow Creek Road, which turns off the Alyeska Highway at mile 0.3. It produced up to 700 oz. of gold per month.

- Location within Alaska
- Nearest city: Girdwood, Alaska
- Coordinates: 61°00′01″N 149°03′57″W
- Area: 4 acres (1.6 ha)
- Built: 1898
- NRHP reference No.: 78000517
- AHRS No.: SEW-191

Significant dates
- Added to NRHP: September 13, 1978
- Designated AHRS: February, 1977

The first claims to be located on Crow Creek are said to have been staked in 1897, near the mouth of the stream and on the site of the present placer workings. In the years preceding 1903, most of the mining was done by pick and shovel on the most easily accessible gold-bearing gravels. The ground mined included the so-called Eagan bar, near the mouth of the stream, the present rock canyon, and some of the surface gravels above the canyon. In 1903 and 1904, hydraulic methods were used, but difficulty was experienced in reaching bedrock above the rock canyon. While the early history of this ground is not clear, it is known that eight partners, locally known as the "Crow Creek boys," were mining in 1904 in the vicinity of the rock canyon on the lower portion of the stream, and that late in 1904, an old, deeply filled rock channel lying northeast of the present canyon was discovered.

From 1905 to 1914 the efforts of the several companies operating at this place were in large part directed to removing the gravels above and in this old channel for the purpose of obtaining a bedrock drain to the gravel basin above the present canyon. The Crow Creek Consolidated Mining Co. was organized and operated until 1906. In 1907, the property was sold to the Nutter-Dawson Co., and in 1914 this concern was reorganized into the Alaska Crow Creek Mining Co.

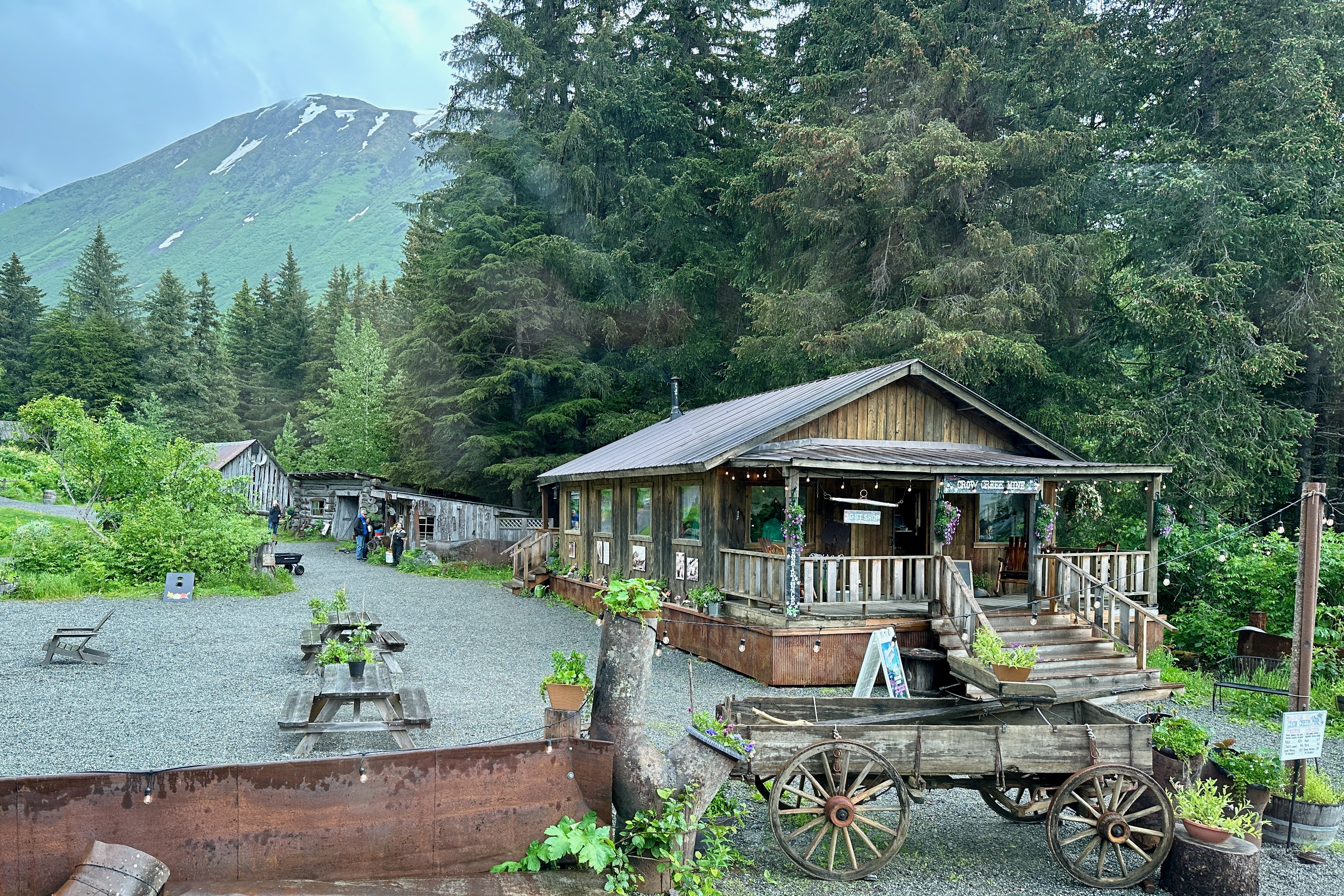
Crow Creek Mine entrance

The Alaska Crow Creek Mining Company operated a hydraulic operation. There were approximately 30 creek and bench claims in the group covering several miles of the creek bed. Much of the company's attention was expended in an effort to get the property in a good working condition and it was not until the fall of 1915 that the work was completed. The gravels toward the lower end of the creek, a greater portion of which were comparatively barren, were sluiced out to bedrock and a flume built to bypass the stream around this point. A bedrock flume 2,200 feet (670 m) long, 5 feet (1.5 m) wide, and 5 feet (1.5 m) deep was built in this cut on a grade of seven inches to the box length (12 feet (3.7 m)). At the intake, the floor of the first box was manganese steel plates. The next seven had railroad iron for riffles and from there. 14-inch sawed, wooden blocks were used. A ditch, about 1 mile (1.6 km) long, conveyed the water from the upper portion of Crow Creek to the penstock, which gave a fall of from 300–400 feet (91–122 m) at the bottom of the pit. The main pipe line is 2 feet (0.61 m) in diameter. Several giants were operated, according to the stage of the water. The property was equipped with a complete sawmill which furnished lumber for the flume and dwellings. The 16 claims later included in this property extended in a double tier from Glacier Creek, at the mouth of Winner Creek, up Crow Creek for the length of seven claims, with two additional overlapping claims above.

The Crow Creek Mine continues to operate today, and the area is open to the public as a tourist attraction. It includes historic buildings dating to the early days of the mining operations, which are listed on the National Register of Historic Places.

== See also ==
- National Register of Historic Places listings in Anchorage, Alaska
