= Glacier Creek (Turnagain Arm) =

Coordinates: 60°56′14″N 149°10′21″W

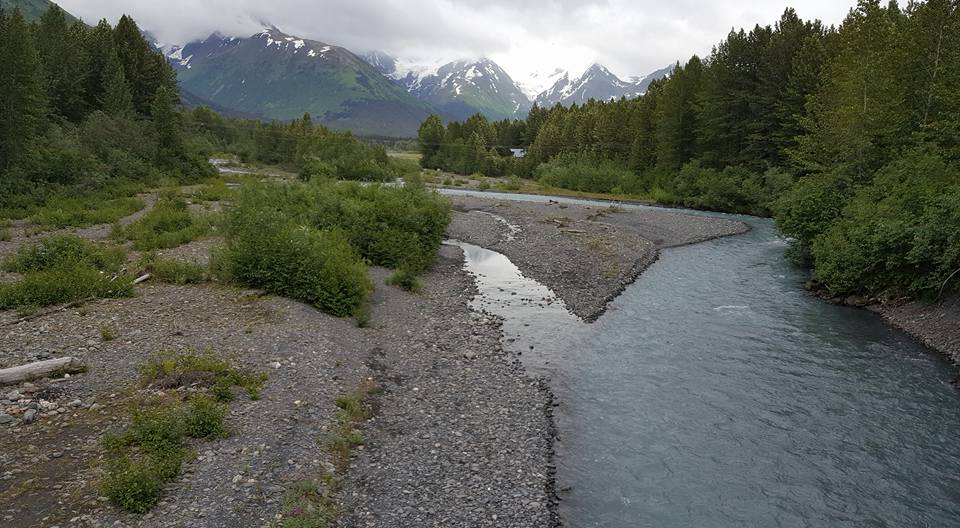
Glacier Creek in Girdwood, just below the junction with Crow Creek.

Glacier Creek is a 10 miles long stream flowing out of the Chugach Mountains, which enters the Turnagain Arm of Cook Inlet near Girdwood, Alaska.

== Tributaries ==
Crow Creek is the largest tributary of Glacier Creek. It rises in the high mountains of the divide between this part of the Turnagain Arm drainage and Eagle River, a tributary of Knik Arm. It is 4–5 miles (6.4–8.0 km) in length, heading against Raven Creek of the Eagle River drainage in a broad pass—Crow Creek Pass—about 3,550 feet (1,080 m)) feet above sea level and entering Glacier Creek from the northwest at a point 5 miles (8.0 km) from Turnagain Arm.

California Creek has cut a steep, narrow, V-shaped valley in the mountains west of Glacier Creek, which it joins 2 miles (3.2 km) from the arm. Its bedrock comprises the same materials found on Crow Creek. The gravels are similar, also, but carry less granite and do not show in the same degree the effect of glacial action.

Winner Creek joins Glacier Creek just below the mouth of Crow Creek. Its valley, bedrock, and gravels resemble those of California Creek.

== Trivia ==
In the TV show Gold Rush: Dave Turin's Lost Mine, Dave Turin operates a gold mine located at Glacier Creek. The mine is operated during 2021 mining season in the show Gold Rush: Dave Turin's Lost Mine (appearing in the 2022 season of the TV show) and during the subsequent 2022 mining season in the show Gold Rush (appearing in the 2023 season of the TV show).
