= Alyeska Resort =

Ski area in Alaska, United States

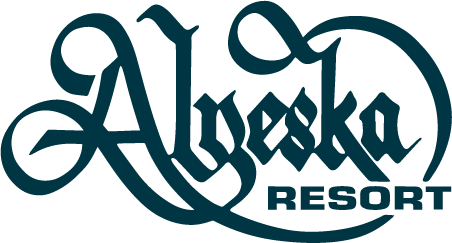

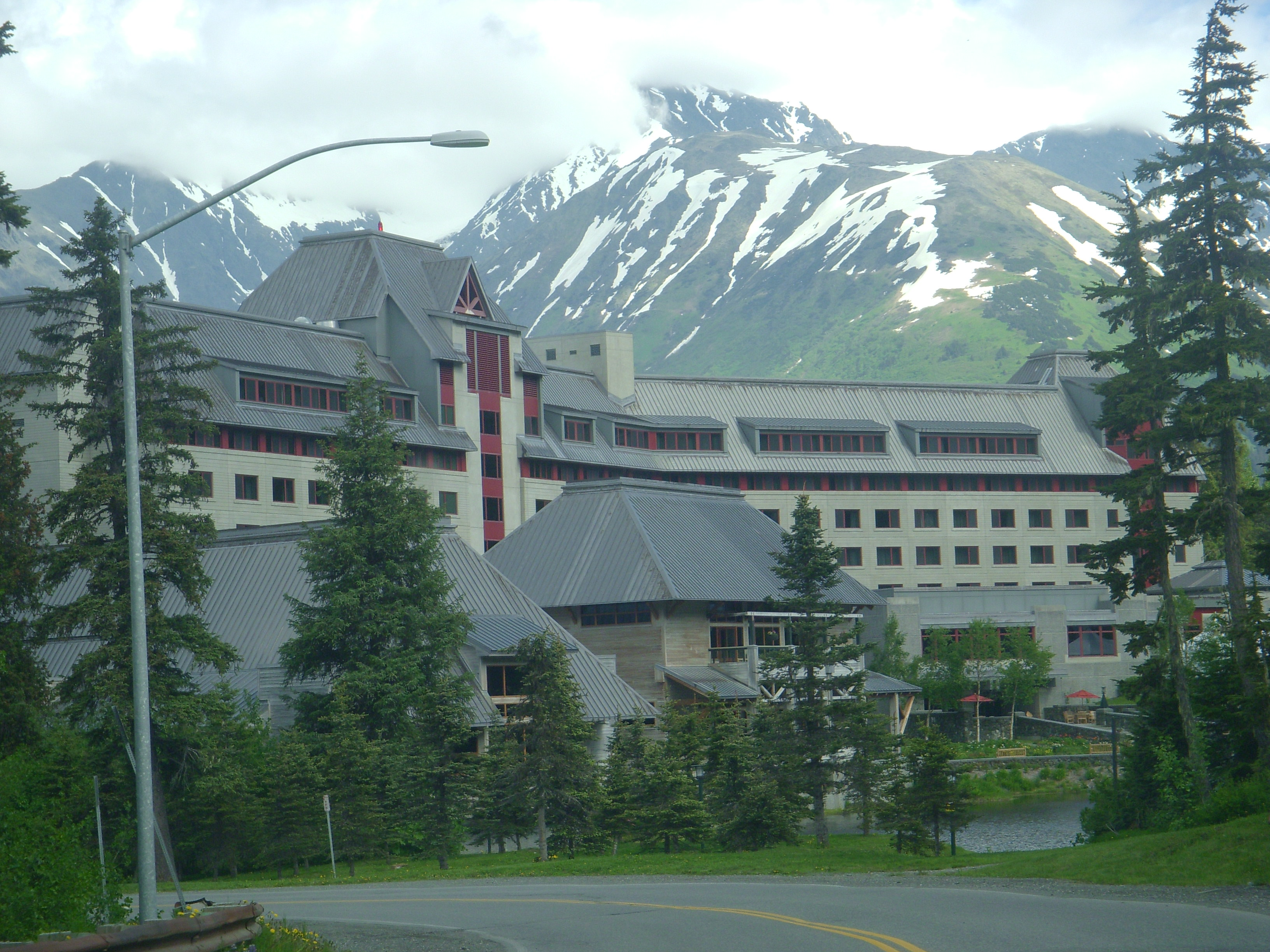
- Alyeska Resort in June 2008

- Location in Alaska Alyeska Resort (North America)
- Location: Girdwood, Anchorage, Alaska
- Nearest city: Anchorage
- Coordinates: 60.9705°N 149.0982°W
- Vertical: 2,500 ft (760 m) lift served; 3,200 ft (975 m) total
- Top elevation: 2,750 ft (840 m) lift served; 3,939 ft (1,200 m) (summit)
- Base elevation: 250 ft (80 m)
- Skiable area: 1,400 acres (5.7 km^{2})
- Trails: 73: 11% easiest; 52% more difficult; 37% most difficult
- Lift system: 8 total: 1 tram; 2 high-speed quad chairs; 2 quad chairs (fixed-grip); 1 double chairs (fixed-grip); 2 magic carpets
- Lift capacity: 10,335 per hour
- Snowfall: 650 in (1,650 cm) - top 512 in (1,300 cm) - mid 208 in (530 cm) - base
- Snowmaking: 113 acres (0.46 km^{2})
- Night skiing: Thu–Sat (4–9 pm) nightly (late Dec to early Jan)
- Website: alyeskaresort.com

Alyeska Resort is a ski resort in the Girdwood area of Anchorage, Alaska, approximately 30 miles (48 km) from downtown Anchorage. Mount Alyeska is part of the Chugach mountain range and the Alyeska Resort is the largest ski area in the state. It includes the mountaintop Mt. Alyeska Roundhouse, which is listed on the National Register of Historic Places.

== Facilities and terrain ==
- Mt. Alyeska Roundhouse
- U.S. National Register of Historic Places
- Location within Alaska
- Nearest city: Girdwood, Alaska
- Coordinates: 60°57′42″N 149°4′50″W
- Built: 1960
- NRHP reference No.: 02000562
- Added to NRHP: November 5, 2003

The Alyeska Ski Corporation was founded in 1954, and the first chairlift and day lodge were opened in 1959. The Roundhouse ski lodge and ski patrol station at the top of the mountain began construction in 1960. It is an octagonal building. Still standing, it was listed on the National Register of Historic Places as "Mt. Alyeska Roundhouse" in 2003, and now houses a museum to local ski history.

Currently, Alyeska has five chairlifts, one high-speed aerial tramway, and two Magic Carpets. Of the five chairlifts, one is co-owned by Alyeska and the Tanaka Foundation (Chair 5). Chairs 6 and 4 are high-speed detachable quads, while Chairs 7 and 3 are normal quads. Chair 4 was updated to a high speed quad in 2012. A sixth chairlift, Chair 1, was removed from service in the summer of 2017.

Chair 4 ends halfway up the mountain. The tram ends three-quarters of the way up the mountain. The interconnected buildings contain the Roundhouse (patrol quarters), and a much newer facility housing the upper tram terminal, a quick-service cafeteria, and the Seven Glaciers 4-star restaurant and bar. At the base of the tram is the modern 300-room Hotel Alyeska.

Chair 6 goes to the highest lift served point on the mountain at 2,750 feet (840 m). Several areas above Chair 6 are occasionally opened, but require hiking to access. Plans to build a new chair lift higher up the mountain have been announced.

Mount Alyeska is a fairly challenging mountain, and has a much higher percentage of advanced and expert runs, as compared to most other mountains in North America. It has a small section for the novice, but the rest of the mountain is almost entirely for the intermediate and the advanced skiers.

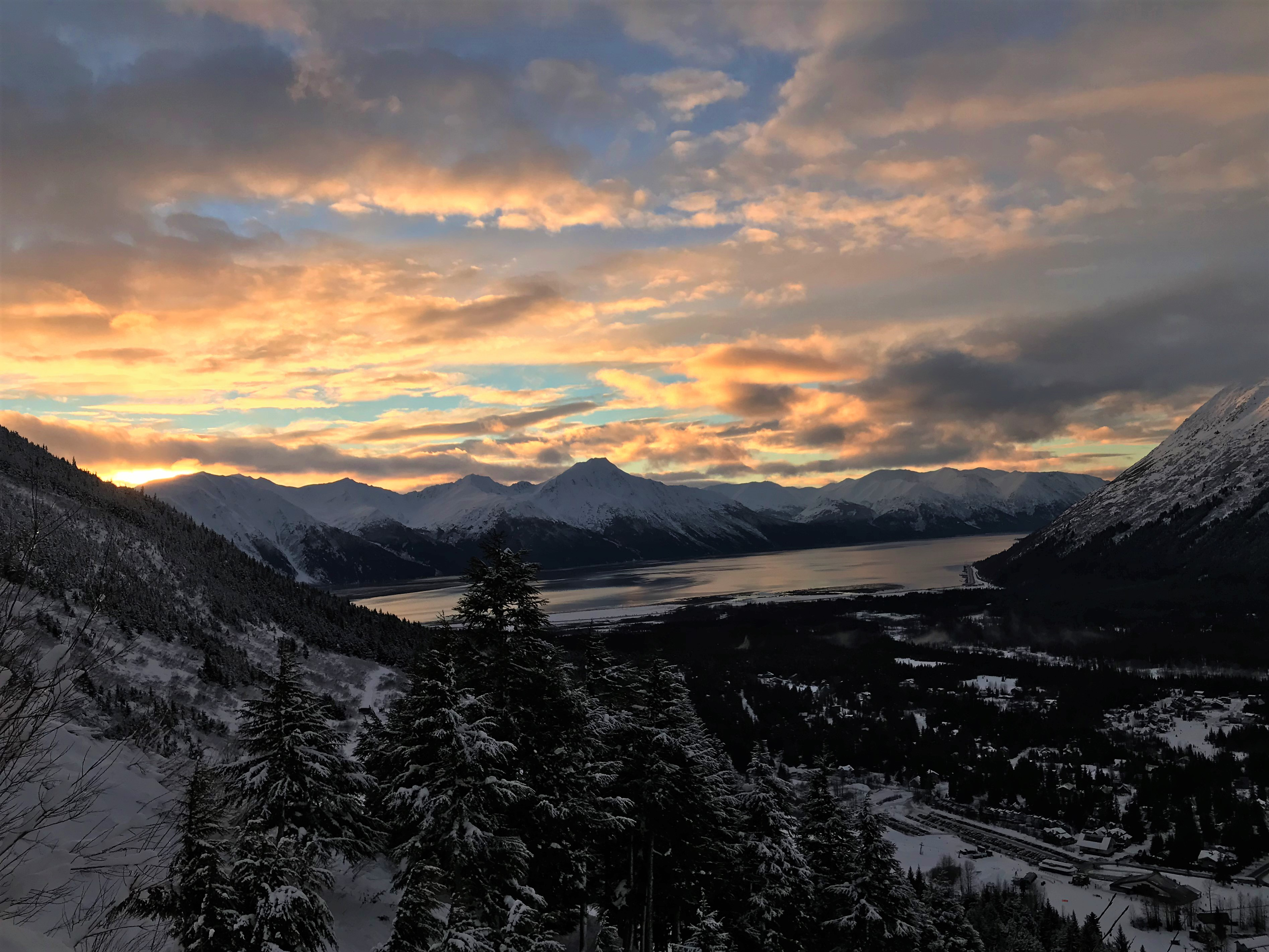
Turnagain Arm seen from Mount Alyeska

=== Terrain Aspects ===
- North: 35%
- West: 40%
- East: 0%
- South: 25%

== Racing ==
Alyeska hosted World Cup giant slalom ski races in 1973 for both men and women. Alyeska first hosted the U.S. Alpine Championships in 1963; the championships returned in 1981, 2004, 2007, and 2009.

American Olympic gold medalist Tommy Moe (b. 1970) sharpened his racing skills at Alyeska as a teenager in the 1980s.

== 2006 purchase ==
Alyeska was bought in December 2006 by John Byrne III, who said he planned to make improvements to the resort, with a concentration on people who come to ski for the day. Some of the improvements included the installation of RFID gates at all of the lifts, the removal of bubbles from chair 6, new paint on the tram, and construction of the only superpipe in Alaska. According to a statement issued October 9, 2018 by the resort's director of marketing, Eric Fullerton, Alyeska Resort has entered into a contract to sell "substantially all of its resort assets" to Pomeroy Lodging.

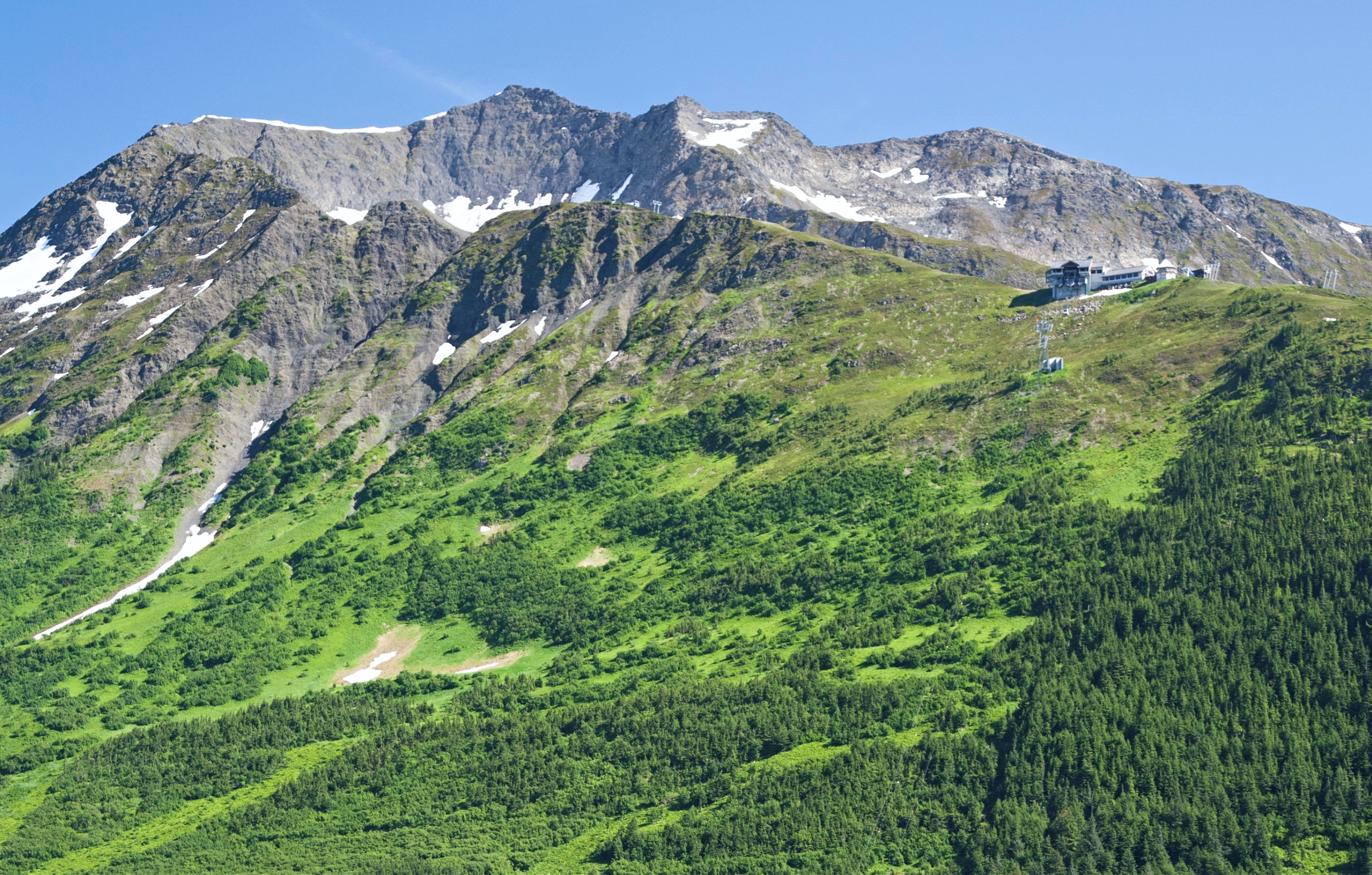
Mount Alyeska

== Climate ==
Alyeska has a subarctic climate (Köppen: Dfc), with short but mild summers and long, snowy winters. Snowfall is extremely heavy, owing to the Aleutian Low, with an average year getting 209 inches (530 cm) of snow at the base (elevation 250 feet above sea level) and an average exceeding 650 inches (17 meters) at the top of the Glacier Bowl Express (GBX) chairlift. The record annual snowfall measured at the top of the GBX is 939 inches (23.9 meters) during the 2000–01 season. Precipitation in general is heavy, but is considerably less from late spring to mid- summer. A freeze has been recorded for every month of the year.

Climate data for Alyeska Ski Resort, 1991−2020 normals, extremes 1963−present
Month	Jan	Feb	Mar	Apr	May	Jun	Jul	Aug	Sep	Oct	Nov	Dec	Year
Record high °F (°C)	57 (14)	53 (12)	57 (14)	67 (19)	78 (26)	85 (29)	89 (32)	88 (31)	73 (23)	63 (17)	51 (11)	50 (10)	89 (32)
Mean maximum °F (°C)	42.0 (5.6)	42.9 (6.1)	45.6 (7.6)	54.4 (12.4)	68.0 (20.0)	75.7 (24.3)	77.3 (25.2)	75.3 (24.1)	65.7 (18.7)	54.5 (12.5)	44.5 (6.9)	41.2 (5.1)	79.1 (26.2)
Mean daily maximum °F (°C)	27.1 (−2.7)	31.4 (−0.3)	35.7 (2.1)	45.5 (7.5)	55.4 (13.0)	63.8 (17.7)	66.5 (19.2)	64.5 (18.1)	56.3 (13.5)	44.4 (6.9)	32.7 (0.4)	29.4 (−1.4)	46.1 (7.8)
Daily mean °F (°C)	22.0 (−5.6)	25.4 (−3.7)	27.6 (−2.4)	37.1 (2.8)	46.2 (7.9)	54.2 (12.3)	58.1 (14.5)	56.0 (13.3)	48.5 (9.2)	38.0 (3.3)	27.4 (−2.6)	24.3 (−4.3)	38.7 (3.7)
Mean daily minimum °F (°C)	16.8 (−8.4)	19.3 (−7.1)	19.5 (−6.9)	28.7 (−1.8)	37.0 (2.8)	44.7 (7.1)	49.6 (9.8)	47.6 (8.7)	40.8 (4.9)	31.5 (−0.3)	22.2 (−5.4)	19.2 (−7.1)	31.4 (−0.3)
Mean minimum °F (°C)	−5.0 (−20.6)	0.0 (−17.8)	4.0 (−15.6)	16.1 (−8.8)	29.8 (−1.2)	37.2 (2.9)	43.0 (6.1)	39.1 (3.9)	29.6 (−1.3)	17.2 (−8.2)	3.7 (−15.7)	−0.9 (−18.3)	−7.4 (−21.9)
Record low °F (°C)	−30 (−34)	−24 (−31)	−18 (−28)	−2 (−19)	24 (−4)	31 (−1)	32 (0)	30 (−1)	17 (−8)	2 (−17)	−15 (−26)	−18 (−28)	−30 (−34)
Average precipitation inches (mm)	7.34 (186)	6.57 (167)	5.37 (136)	5.25 (133)	3.99 (101)	2.21 (56)	2.66 (68)	4.86 (123)	8.26 (210)	7.78 (198)	7.65 (194)	8.98 (228)	70.92 (1,800)
Average snowfall inches (cm)	37.4 (95)	36.6 (93)	37.5 (95)	9.6 (24)	1.2 (3.0)	0.0 (0.0)	0.0 (0.0)	0.0 (0.0)	0.0 (0.0)	8.1 (21)	29.9 (76)	54.2 (138)	214.5 (545)
Average precipitation days (≥ 0.01 in)	18.9	17.7	15.9	15.9	14.2	11.9	14.4	16.8	19.6	18.8	18.3	21.8	204.2
Average snowy days (≥ 0.1 in)	11.0	10.7	9.9	3.9	0.4	0.0	0.0	0.0	0.1	2.7	9.3	14.0	62.0
Source 1: WRCC
Source 2: NOAA

== See also ==
- National Register of Historic Places listings in Anchorage, Alaska
