= Girdwood, Anchorage, Alaska =

Resort town in Alaska, United States

Coordinates: 60°56′33″N 149°09′59″W

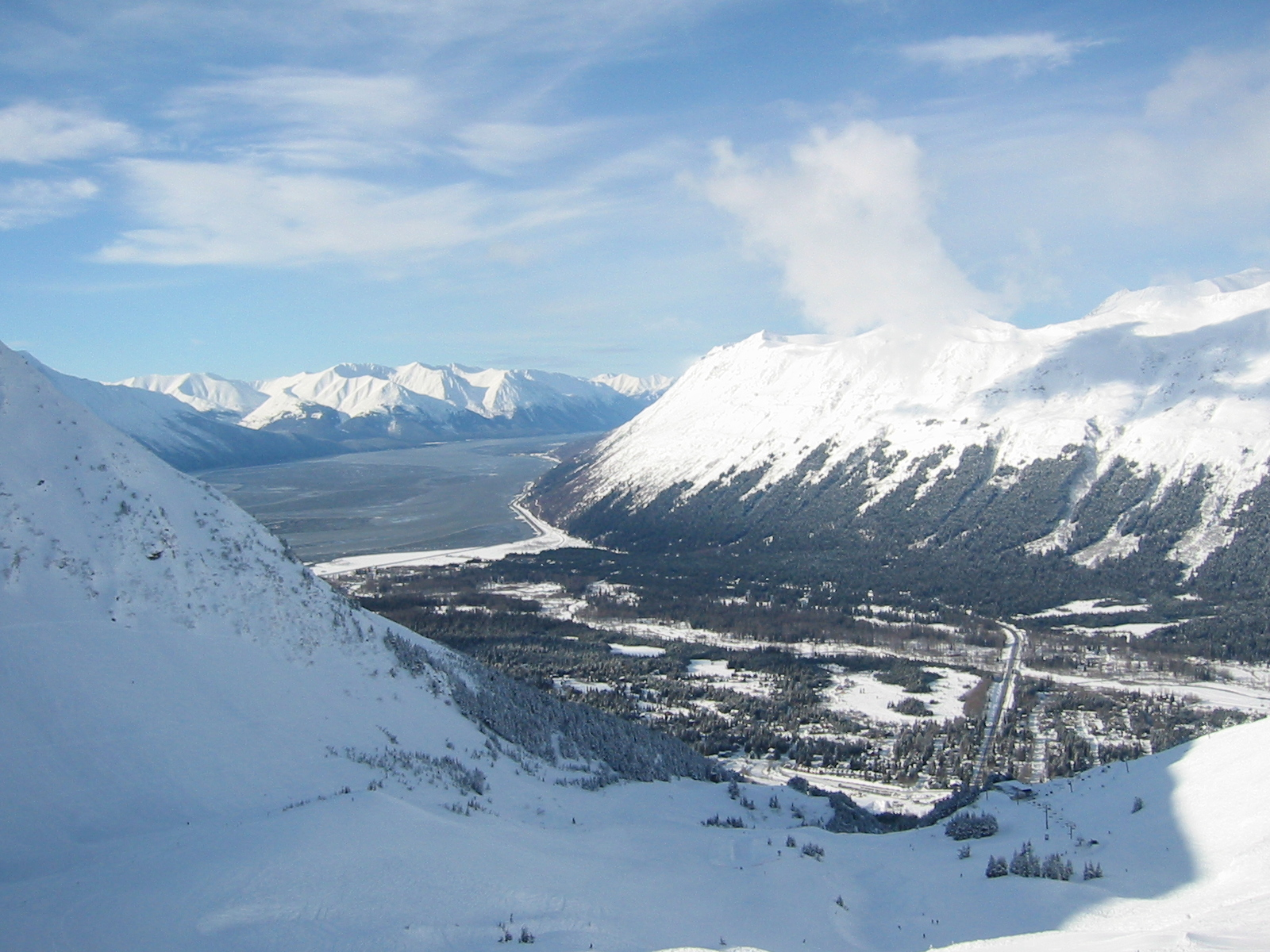
The valley, as viewed from Mount Alyeska. The Alyeska Highway can be seen at right running across the valley.

Girdwood is a resort town in the southern portion of Anchorage, Alaska. Located near the end of the Turnagain Arm of Cook Inlet, Girdwood lies in a valley in the southwestern Chugach Mountains, surrounded by seven glaciers feeding into a number of creeks, which either converge within the valley or empty directly into the arm. Girdwood is typically accessed by the Seward Highway (Milepost 90), with the main line of the Alaska Railroad paralleling the highway. By road distance, most of the community lies within 35 to 40 miles (56 to 64 km) of Downtown Anchorage. The 2019 American Community Survey estimates a population of 1,742 in the valley.

Founded as a community to supply miners during the Turnagain Arm gold rushes of the 1890s, Girdwood was mostly a small, quiet place until the middle of the 20th century. Two events drastically altered that. The first was the establishment of Alyeska Resort along the slopes of Mount Alyeska, which became an international destination coincidental with Anchorage's civic promotion of itself as "The Air Crossroads of the World". The second was the 1964 earthquake, which devastated the original townsite located directly along the arm. Following the earthquake, most of the town moved further up the valley to a new townsite, though a few homes remained and a strip mall was later constructed along the Seward Highway. Historically dominated in the years since the resort's opening by seasonally-occupied vacation homes and seasonal activity at the resort, the opening of the Alyeska Prince Hotel during the 1990s has shifted the resort, and hence Girdwood as a whole, more towards year-round activity and a year-round economy. This has led to periodic debates about community growth and affordability of housing for resort workers, many of whom over the years have resorted to camping illegally on public lands.

Girdwood still revolves heavily around seasonal activity, with skiing and snowboarding at Alyeska Resort bringing visitors and their money into the community. Summer activities are also popular, which include hiking, fishing and rafting. The Girdwood Forest Fair, held every July, is the community's most significant visitor attraction apart from resort-related activities. Girdwood is located within the northernmost extent of rain forest on Earth, and also serves as the closest point of access to Chugach National Forest from Anchorage proper.

== History ==
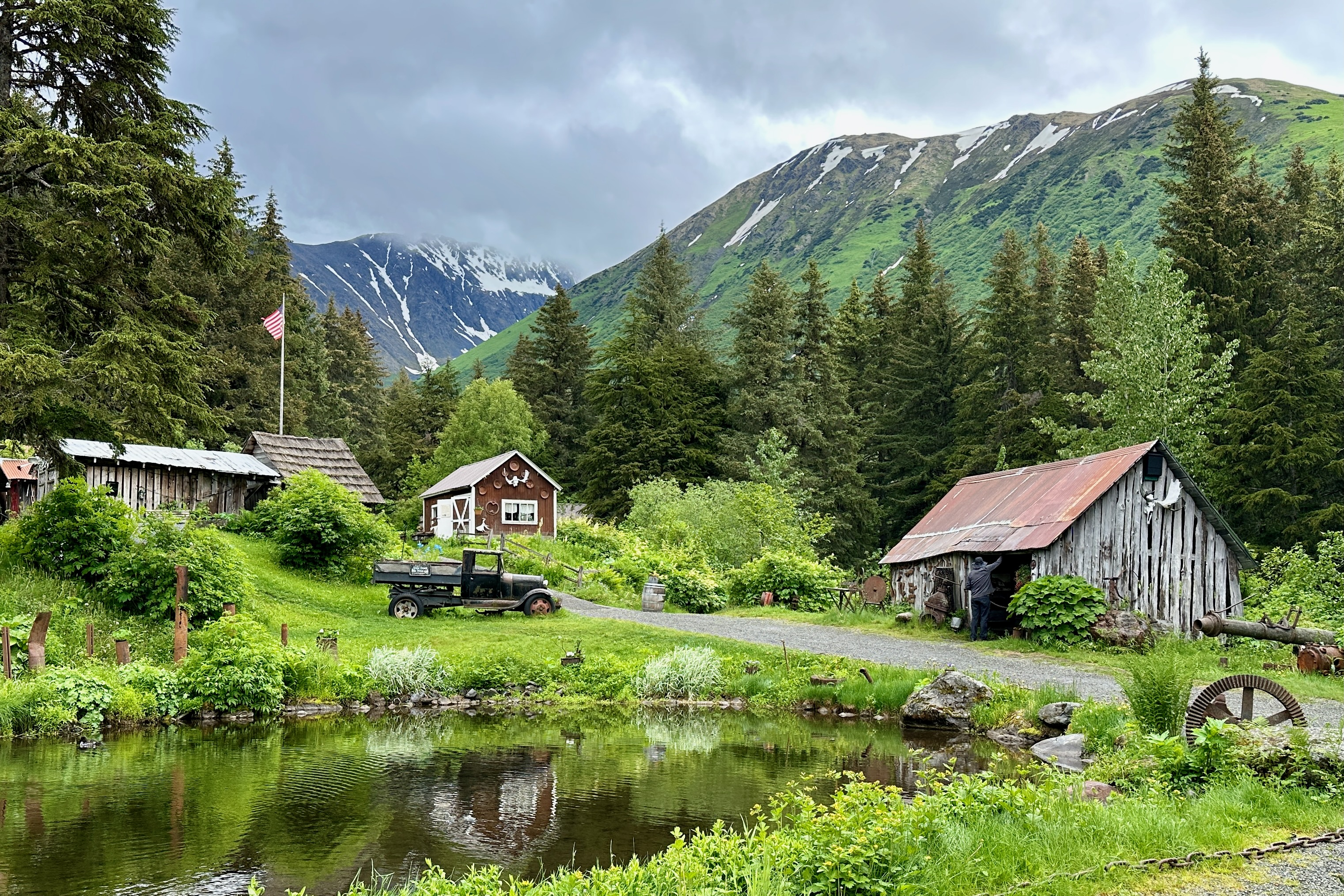
Crow Creek Gold Mine near Girdwood

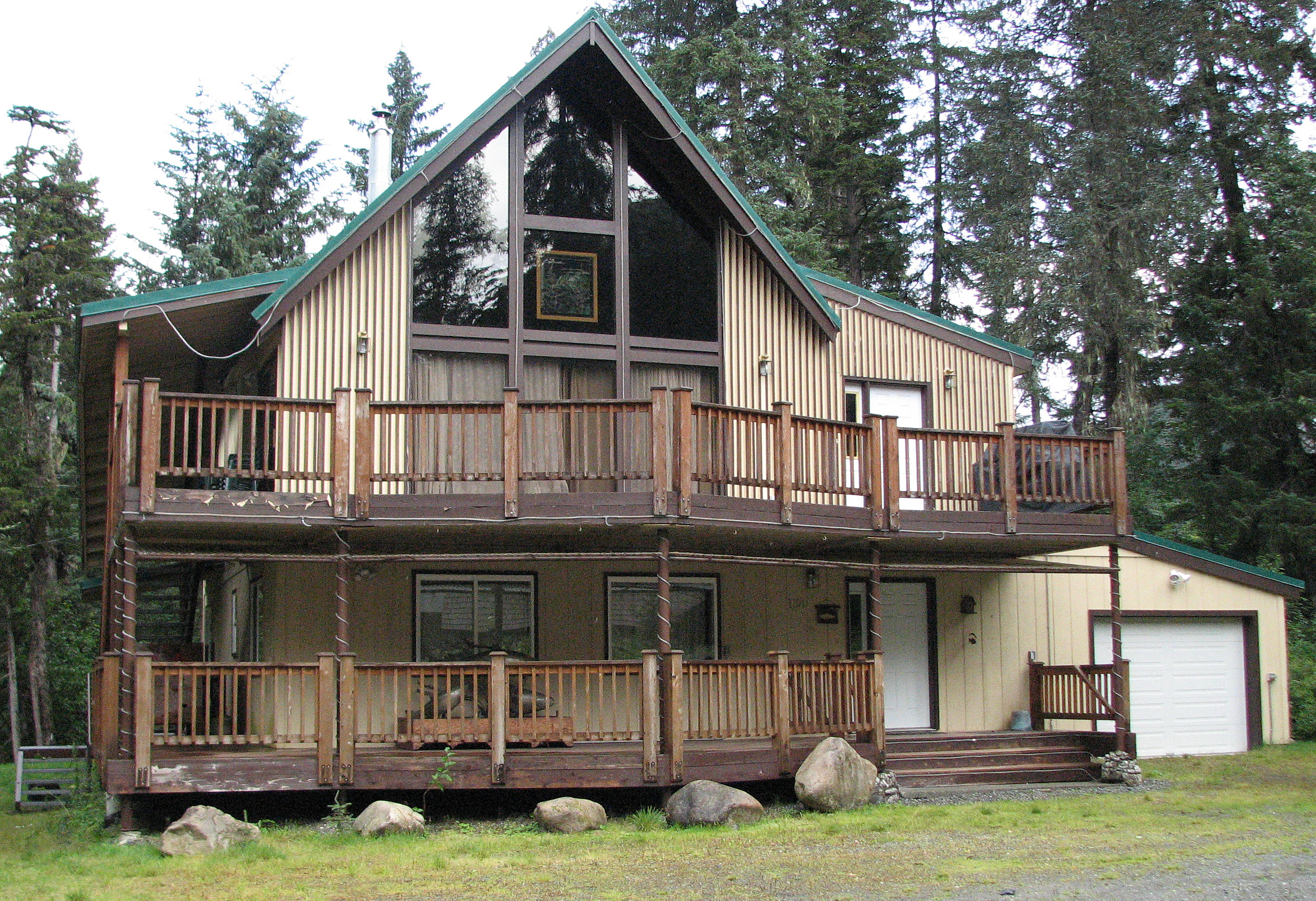
Ted Stevens' house is a fairly typical example of a house in Girdwood.

Originally called "Glacier City," Girdwood was founded as a supply camp for placer gold miners with claims along the creeks feeding Turnagain Arm. It was renamed for Colonel James Girdwood, a Belfast-born, Scots-Irish entrepreneur and linen merchant who staked the first four gold claims along Crow Creek in 1896.

The town was moved 2.5 miles (4.0 km) up the valley after the devastating Good Friday earthquake of 1964, when the land under the original townsite subsided into Turnagain Arm, putting much of the town below high tide. The nearby settlement of Alyeska was abandoned and most of its inhabitants moved to the new Girdwood townsite as well. The land has not all since been reclaimed, as one can still see inundated cabins in the marshy areas into which the city formerly extended. Significant earthquakes are a relatively common occurrence for Girdwood and the Kenai peninsula. Evidence indicates the area has seen six major quakes in the past 3,300 years.

Girdwood was incorporated as a city in 1961 and was absorbed into the Municipality of Anchorage in 1975, when the Greater Anchorage Area Borough unified with Anchorage and the borough's smaller cities.

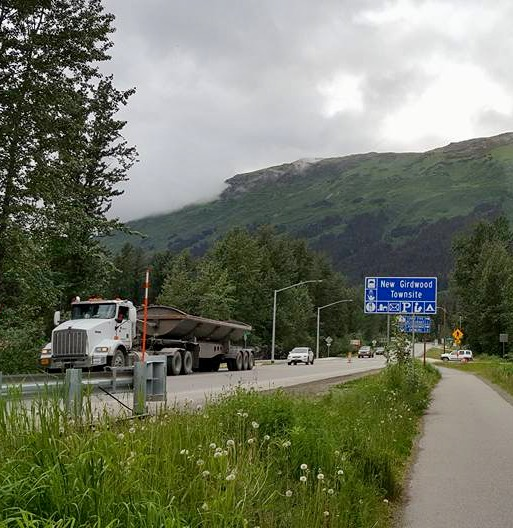
Alyeska Highway and sign indicating the post-1964 town site

The town has served as a backdrop for at least two films: The Chechahcos, a 1924 silent film about the Klondike Gold Rush, and Warren Miller's 1997 Snowriders II. Girdwood was the home of Alaska's former senior U.S. Senator Ted Stevens, and Girdwood found itself in the media spotlight when the construction projects on Stevens' home became the subject of a federal investigation. Olympic gold and silver medal-winning skier Tommy Moe also called Girdwood home during his high school years, during which he attended Glacier Creek Academy.

Girdwood was shown on CBS on January 20, 2008, as the finish line for The Amazing Race 12.

== Geography ==
=== Climate ===
According to the Köppen climate classification, Girdwood has a subarctic climate, abbreviated Dfc on climate maps. It is much wetter and snowier than downtown Anchorage as it is not shielded from Pacific moisture: annual precipitation is four times that of the downtown, whilst annual snowfall reaches 214.5 inches or 5.4 meters, which is comparable to such extremely wet localities as Yakutat or Whittier.

Climate data for Girdwood (Alyeska Ski Resort), 1991−2020 normals, extremes 1963−present
Month	Jan	Feb	Mar	Apr	May	Jun	Jul	Aug	Sep	Oct	Nov	Dec	Year
Record high °F (°C)	57 (14)	53 (12)	57 (14)	67 (19)	78 (26)	85 (29)	89 (32)	88 (31)	73 (23)	63 (17)	51 (11)	50 (10)	89 (32)
Mean maximum °F (°C)	42.0 (5.6)	42.9 (6.1)	45.6 (7.6)	54.4 (12.4)	68.0 (20.0)	75.7 (24.3)	77.3 (25.2)	75.3 (24.1)	65.7 (18.7)	54.5 (12.5)	44.5 (6.9)	41.2 (5.1)	79.1 (26.2)
Mean daily maximum °F (°C)	27.1 (−2.7)	31.4 (−0.3)	35.7 (2.1)	45.5 (7.5)	55.4 (13.0)	63.8 (17.7)	66.5 (19.2)	64.5 (18.1)	56.3 (13.5)	44.4 (6.9)	32.7 (0.4)	29.4 (−1.4)	46.1 (7.8)
Daily mean °F (°C)	22.0 (−5.6)	25.4 (−3.7)	27.6 (−2.4)	37.1 (2.8)	46.2 (7.9)	54.2 (12.3)	58.1 (14.5)	56.0 (13.3)	48.5 (9.2)	38.0 (3.3)	27.4 (−2.6)	24.3 (−4.3)	38.7 (3.7)
Mean daily minimum °F (°C)	16.8 (−8.4)	19.3 (−7.1)	19.5 (−6.9)	28.7 (−1.8)	37.0 (2.8)	44.7 (7.1)	49.6 (9.8)	47.6 (8.7)	40.8 (4.9)	31.5 (−0.3)	22.2 (−5.4)	19.2 (−7.1)	31.4 (−0.3)
Mean minimum °F (°C)	−5.0 (−20.6)	0.0 (−17.8)	4.0 (−15.6)	16.1 (−8.8)	29.8 (−1.2)	37.2 (2.9)	43.0 (6.1)	39.1 (3.9)	29.6 (−1.3)	17.2 (−8.2)	3.7 (−15.7)	−0.9 (−18.3)	−7.4 (−21.9)
Record low °F (°C)	−30 (−34)	−24 (−31)	−18 (−28)	−2 (−19)	24 (−4)	31 (−1)	32 (0)	30 (−1)	17 (−8)	2 (−17)	−15 (−26)	−18 (−28)	−30 (−34)
Average precipitation inches (mm)	7.34 (186)	6.57 (167)	5.37 (136)	5.25 (133)	3.99 (101)	2.21 (56)	2.66 (68)	4.86 (123)	8.26 (210)	7.78 (198)	7.65 (194)	8.98 (228)	70.92 (1,800)
Average snowfall inches (cm)	37.4 (95)	36.6 (93)	37.5 (95)	9.6 (24)	1.2 (3.0)	0.0 (0.0)	0.0 (0.0)	0.0 (0.0)	0.0 (0.0)	8.1 (21)	29.9 (76)	54.2 (138)	214.5 (545)
Average precipitation days (≥ 0.01 in)	18.9	17.7	15.9	15.9	14.2	11.9	14.4	16.8	19.6	18.8	18.3	21.8	204.2
Average snowy days (≥ 0.1 in)	11.0	10.7	9.9	3.9	0.4	0.0	0.0	0.0	0.1	2.7	9.3	14.0	62.0
Source 1: WRCC
Source 2: NOAA

== Demographics ==
Historical population
Census	Pop.	Note	%±
1950	79		—
1960	63		−20.3%
1970	144		128.6%
2020	2,025		—
U.S. Decennial Census

Girdwood first appeared on the 1950 U.S. Census as an unincorporated village. It formally incorporated as a city in 1961 and merged into Anchorage in 1975.

== Notable residents ==
- Callan Chythlook-Sifsof (born 1989), Olympic snowboarder
- Rosey Fletcher (born 1975), Olympic snowboarder
- Keegan Messing (born 1992), Canadian-American Olympic figure skater
- Lisa Murkowski (born 1957), U.S. Senator from Alaska (2002–present)
- Ted Stevens (1923–2010), lawyer who served as a U.S. Senator from Alaska from 1968 to 2009.
