= Camp Sullivan =

Camp Sullivan can refer to:

- Camp Sullivan (Indiana), located on the grounds of Military Park
- Camp Sullivan (Alaska), located in Whittier, Alaska
