= Camp Sullivan (Alaska) =

United States Army camp in Alaska

Coordinates: 60°46′25.25″N 148°41′14.61″W

Camp Sullivan was a United States Army camp located in Whittier, Alaska from 1943 to 1960. Constructed out of a need to supply the region with military support during World War II, the area became important again during the Cold War after the Army decided to build the 14-story Hodge Building (now Begich Towers) completed in 1957 contained 150 two and three bedroom apartments plus bachelor efficiency units. Dependent families and Civil Service employees were moved into this efficient high rise. The new Whittier School was connected by a tunnel at the base of the west tower so students could go to school in short sleeves on the very worst weather days. The building, originally was named in honor of Colonel Walter William Hodge Civil. Engineer. the CO of 93rd Engineer Regiment on the Alcan Highway. The other structure, the Buckner Building, had been completed in 1953, and was called the "city under one roof". Both buildings were at one time the largest buildings in Alaska. The Begich Building is now a condominium. Together with the 2-story Whittier Manor, Begich Building houses nearly all of Whittier's residents. The port remained an active Army facility until 1960.
