= Arcology =

Type of design principles for human habitats

An arcology or vertical city is a hypothetical mixed-use megastructure featuring high population density with the goal of autarky from the outside environment. The term was coined in 1969 by architect Paolo Soleri as a portmanteau of "architecture" and "ecology." Soleri believed that a completed arcology would provide space for a variety of residential, commercial, and agricultural facilities while minimizing individual human environmental impact.

The concept has been promoted by various science fiction writers. Larry Niven and Jerry Pournelle provided a detailed description of an arcology in their 1981 novel Oath of Fealty. William Gibson popularized the term in his seminal 1984 cyberpunk novel Neuromancer, where each corporation has its own self-contained city known as an arcology. More recently, authors such as Peter Hamilton in Neutronium Alchemist and Paolo Bacigalupi in The Water Knife explicitly used arcologies as part of their scenarios. They are often portrayed as self-contained or economically self-sufficient.

== Development ==
An arcology is distinguished from a merely large building in that it is designed to lessen the impact of human habitation on any given ecosystem. It could be self-sustainable, employing all or most of its own available resources for a comfortable life: power, climate control, food production, air and water conservation and purification, sewage treatment, etc. An arcology is designed to make it possible to supply those items for a large population. An arcology would supply and maintain its own municipal or urban infrastructures in order to operate and connect with other urban environments apart from its own.

Arcologies were proposed in order to reduce human impact on natural resources. Arcology designs might apply conventional building and civil engineering techniques in very large, but practical projects in order to achieve pedestrian economies of scale that have proven, post-automobile, to be difficult to achieve in other ways.

Frank Lloyd Wright proposed an early version called Broadacre City although, in contrast to an arcology, his idea is comparatively two-dimensional and depends on a road network. Wright's plan described transportation, agriculture, and commerce systems that would support an economy. Critics said that Wright's solution failed to account for population growth, and assumed a more rigid democracy than the US actually has.

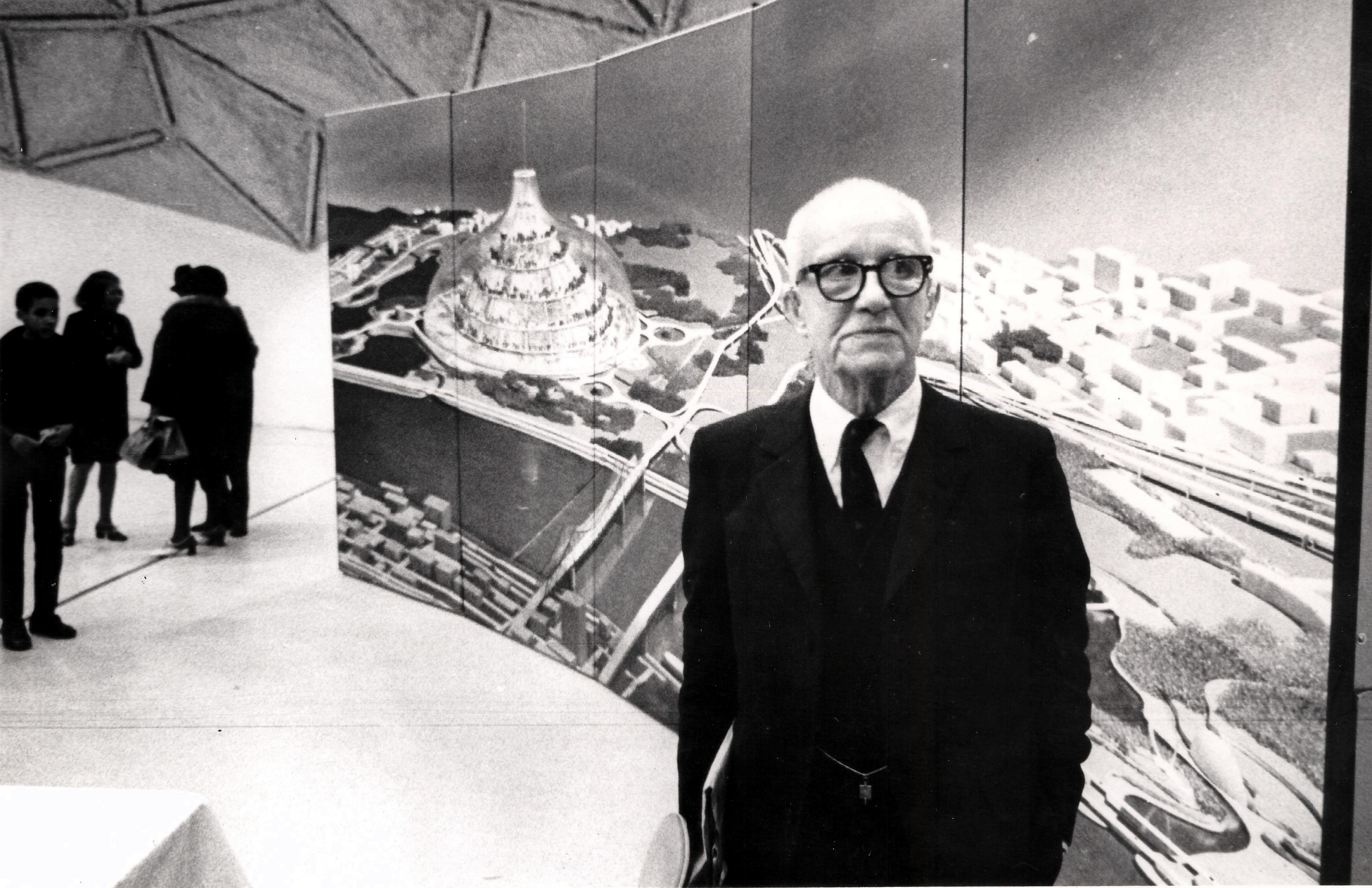
Buckminster Fuller with a drawing of his domed city proposal

Buckminster Fuller proposed the Old Man River's City project, a domed city with a capacity of 125,000, as a solution to the housing problems in East St. Louis, Illinois.

Paolo Soleri proposed later solutions, and coined the term "arcology". Soleri describes ways of compacting city structures in three dimensions to combat two-dimensional urban sprawl, to economize on transportation and other energy uses. Like Wright, Soleri proposed changes in transportation, agriculture, and commerce. Soleri explored reductions in resource consumption and duplication, land reclamation; he also proposed to eliminate most private transportation. He advocated for greater "frugality" and favored greater use of shared social resources, including public transit (and public libraries).

== Similar real-world projects ==
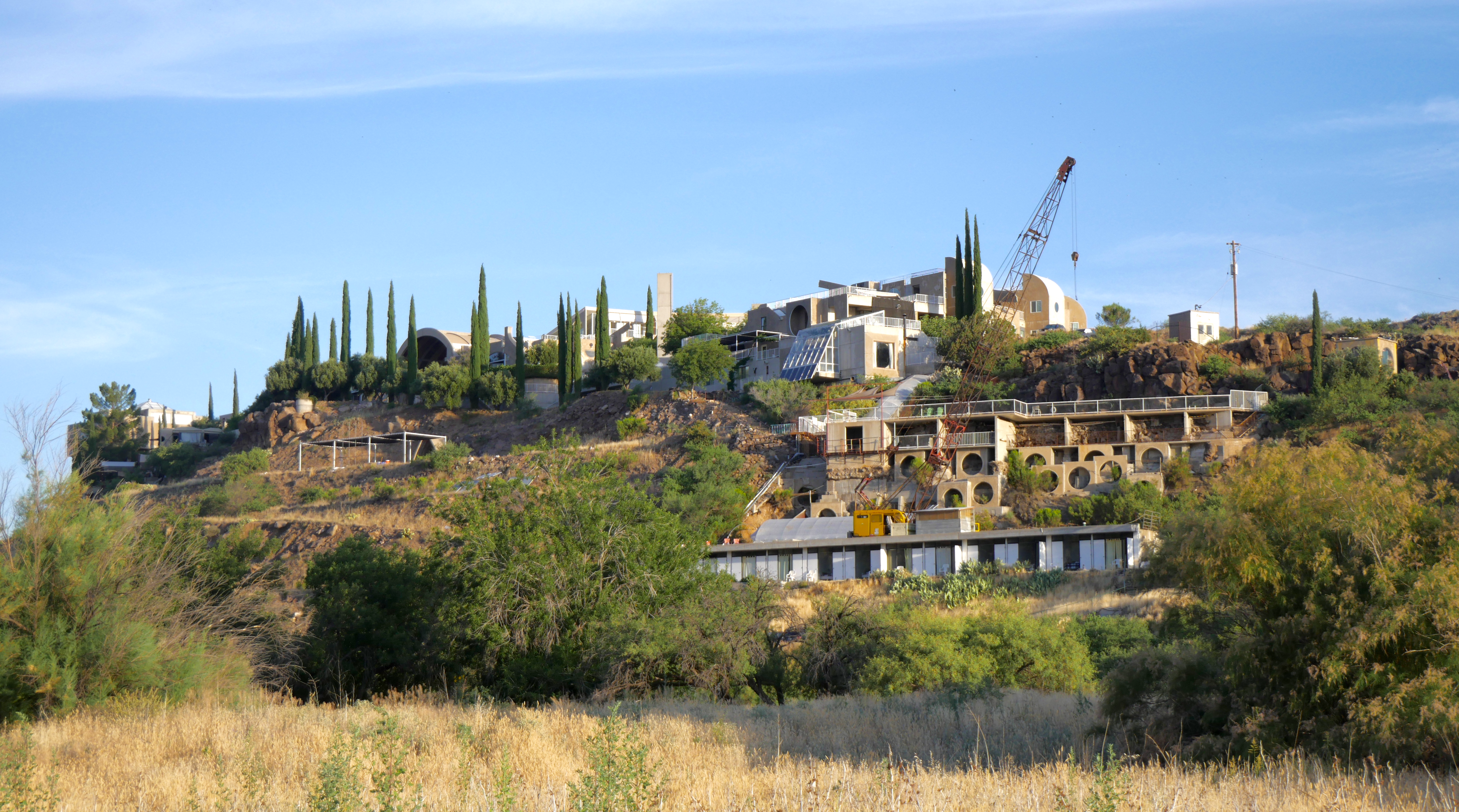
Arcosanti city

Arcosanti is an experimental "arcology prototype", a demonstration project under construction in central Arizona since 1970. Designed by Paolo Soleri, its primary purpose is to demonstrate Soleri's personal designs, his application of principles of arcology to create a pedestrian-friendly urban form.

Many cities in the world have proposed projects adhering to the design principles of the arcology concept, like Tokyo, and Dongtan near Shanghai. The Dongtan project may have collapsed, and it failed to open for the Shanghai World Expo in 2010. The Ihme-Zentrum in Hanover was an attempt to build a "city within a city".

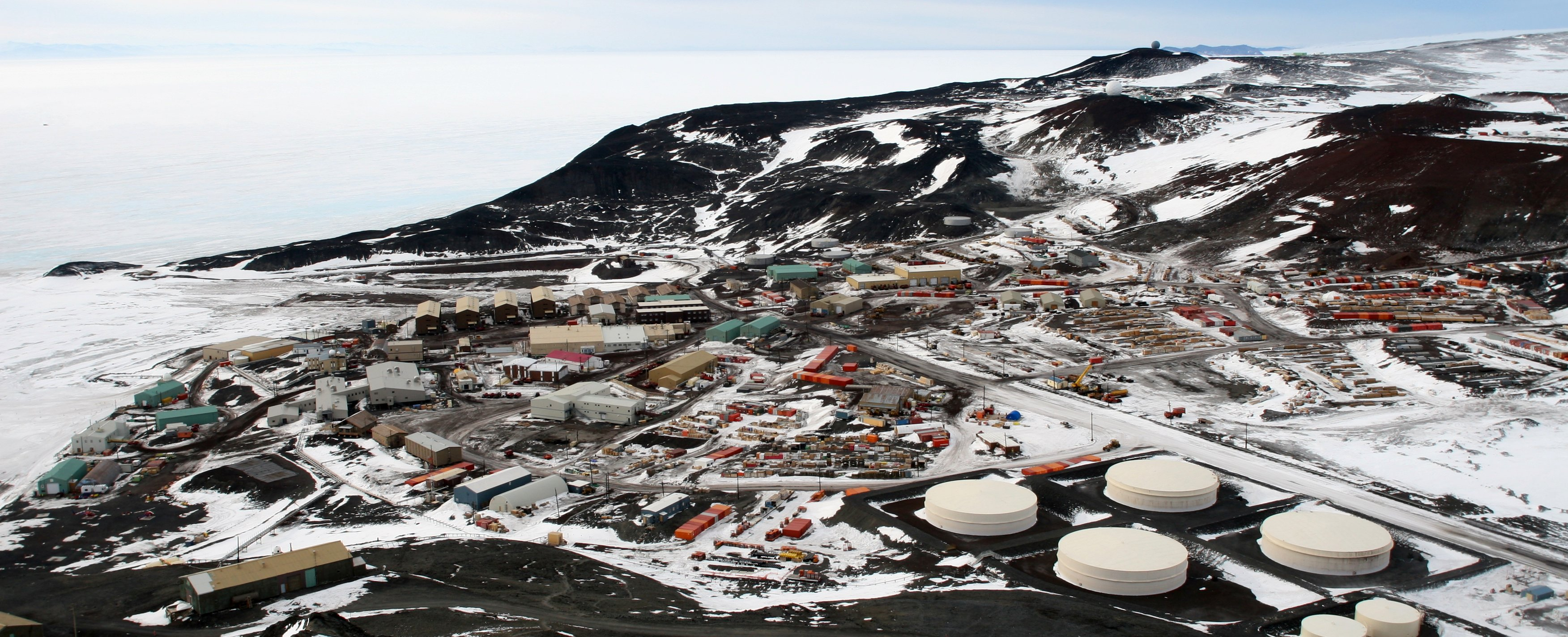
McMurdo Station

McMurdo Station of the United States Antarctic Program and other scientific research stations on Antarctica resemble the popular conception of an arcology as a technologically advanced, relatively self-sufficient human community. The Antarctic research base provides living and entertainment amenities for roughly 3,000 staff who visit each year. Its remoteness and the measures needed to protect its population from the harsh environment give it an insular character. The station is not self-sufficient: The U.S. military delivers 30,000,000 liters (8,000,000 US gal) of fuel and 5 kilotonnes (11 million pounds) of supplies and equipment yearly through its Operation Deep Freeze resupply effort, but it is isolated from conventional support networks. Under international treaty, it must avoid damage to the surrounding ecosystem.

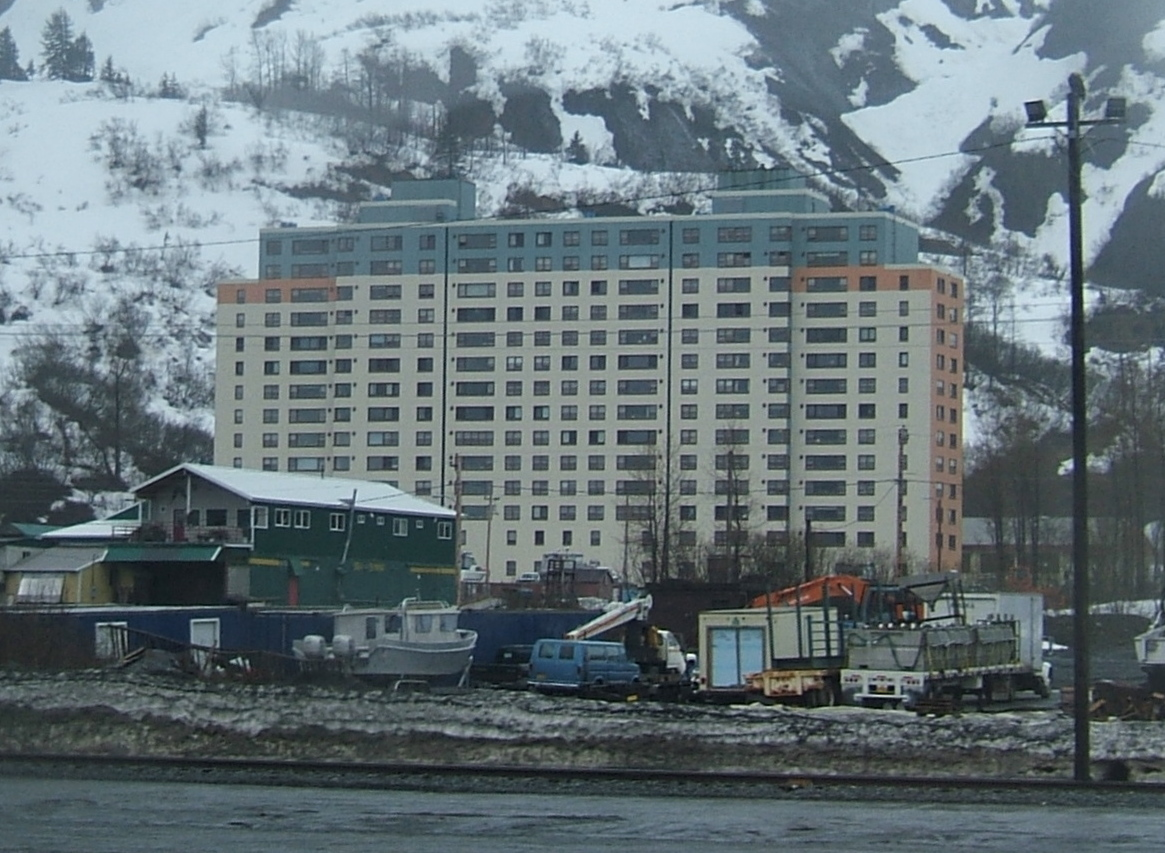
Begich Towers

Begich Towers operates like a small-scale arcology encompassing nearly all of the population of Whittier, Alaska. The building contains residential housing as well as a police station, grocery, and municipal offices.

The Line was planned as a 170-kilometre (110 mi) long and 200-metre (660 ft) wide linear smart city in Saudi Arabia in Neom, Tabuk Province, designed to have no cars, streets or greenhouse gas emissions. The Line is planned to be the first development in Neom, a $500 billion project. The city's plans anticipated a population of 9 million. Excavation work had started along the entire length of the project by October 2022. However, the project was scaled down in 2024 to 2.4 kilometres (1.5 mi) long, housing 300,000 people.

== In popular culture ==
Most proposals to build real arcologies have failed due to financial, structural or conceptual shortcomings. Arcologies are therefore found primarily in fictional works.

- In Robert Silverberg's The World Inside, most of the global population of 75 billion live inside giant skyscrapers, called "urbmons", each of which contains hundreds of thousands of people. The urbmons are arranged in "constellations". Each urbmon is divided into "neighborhoods" of 40 or so floors. All the needs of the inhabitants are provided inside the building — food is grown outside and brought into the building — so the idea of going outside is heretical and can be a sign of madness. The book examines human life when the population density is extremely high.
- Another significant example is the 1981 novel Oath of Fealty by Larry Niven and Jerry Pournelle, in which a segment of the population of Los Angeles has moved into an arcology. The plot examines the social changes that result, both inside and outside the arcology. Thus the arcology is not just a plot device but a subject of critique.
- In the city-building video game SimCity 2000, self-contained arcologies can be built, reducing the infrastructure needs of the city. However, these require external power and water supplies.
- The isometric, cyberpunk-themed action roleplay game The Ascent takes place in a futuristic dystopian version of an arcology on the alien world Veles and prominently uses the structure and its levels to flesh out progression in the game, starting the player in the bottom levels of the sewers with the ultimate goal of reaching the top of the structure to leave the city.
- In the movie Dredd Mega blocks are massive, self-contained high-rise buildings in Mega-City One, each housing tens of thousands of residents in a single structure. These arcologies serve as isolated communities, often plagued by poverty and crime, with entire criminal gangs controlling certain blocks such as Peach Trees, which is prominently featured in the film.
- In the action role-playing game Cyberpunk 2077, Megabuildings are colossal, self-contained residential superstructures in Night City, designed to house tens of thousands of people in stacked apartments above layers of shops and services. Functioning as vertical cities, they reflect extreme urban density and social stratification, with cramped lower levels, more luxurious upper floors, and distinct internal communities.

== See also ==
- Autonomous building – Building designed to be independent from public infrastructure
- Bionic architecture – Contemporary architetonic movement
- Biosphere 2 – Closed ecological research center in Arizona
- Domed city – Large urban area enclosed within a dome
- Earthship – Style of architecture that uses native materials and upcycled materials to build homes
- Kowloon Walled City – Former slum in Hong Kong
- Megastructure – Very large artificial object
- List of visionary tall buildings and structures
- Regent International Center – Residential building in Hangzhou, Zhejiang, China
- Shimizu Mega-City Pyramid – Proposed arcology project in Japan
- Underground city – Series of linked subterranean spaces
- Urban ecology – Scientific study of living organisms
- Vertical farming – Growing crops in stacked layers
