= Regent International Center =

Residential building in Hangzhou, Zhejiang, China

- 新世界·丽晶国际中心
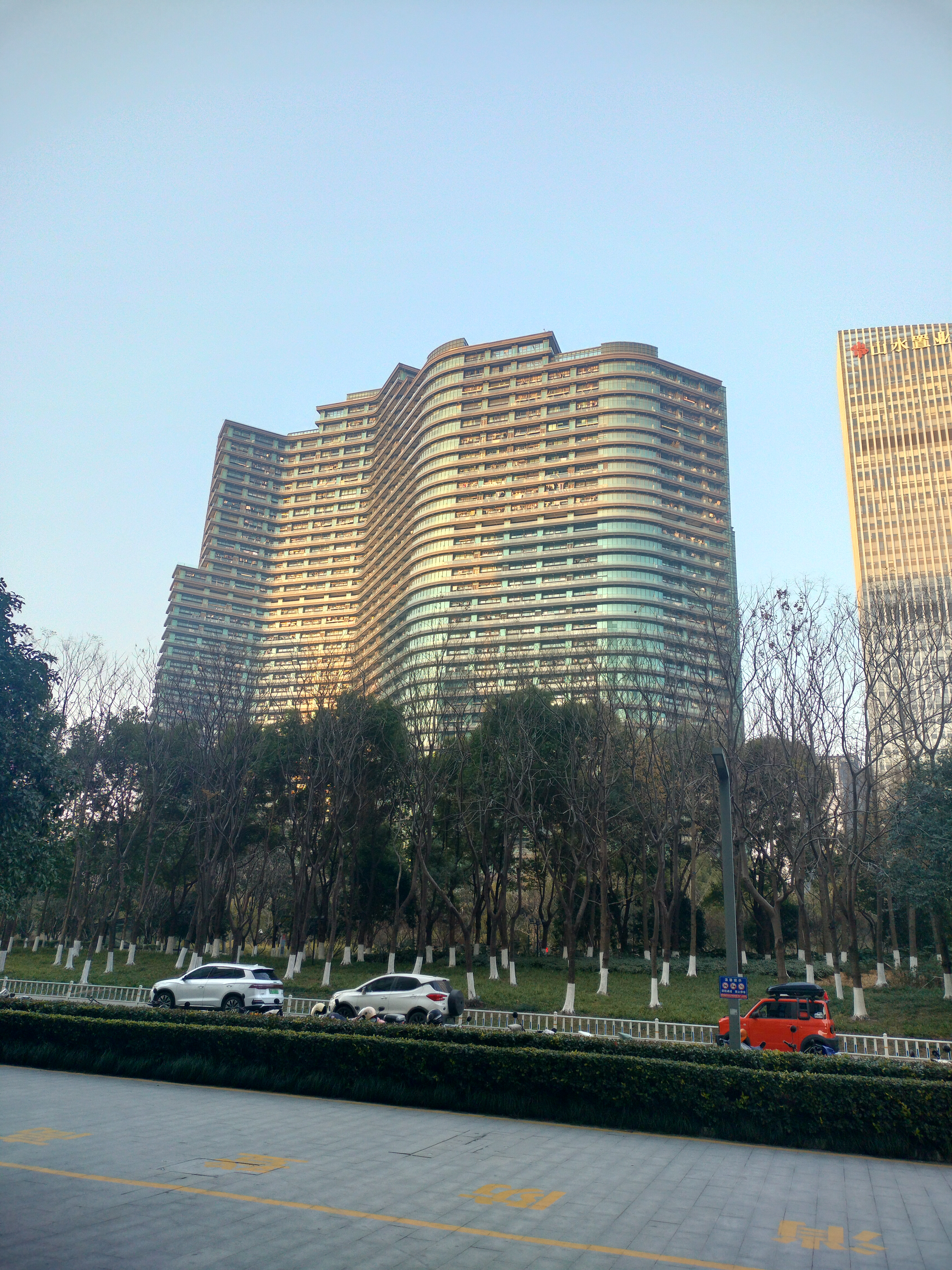
- Alternative names: Regency International Apartments

General information
- Status: Completed
- Location: 2327, Shi Xin Bei Road, Hangzhou, China
- Coordinates: 30°14′39″N 120°14′31″E
- Opened: 2013

Height
- Height: 675 feet (208 meters)

Technical details
- Floor count: 39
- Floor area: 1.47 million square meters

Design and construction
- Architect: Alicia Loo
- Awards: 2012 Zhejiang Best Business Complex

The Regent International Center is an apartment building located in Qianjiang Century City, Hangzhou, China. It is the world's largest apartment building by capacity, capable of housing 20,000–30,000 people. It has been called a "vertical city", as it has many amenities contained within the building, and residents would theoretically never need to leave the building. A large portion of the building's population consists of students and recent migrants to the city as a temporary residence.

== Design ==
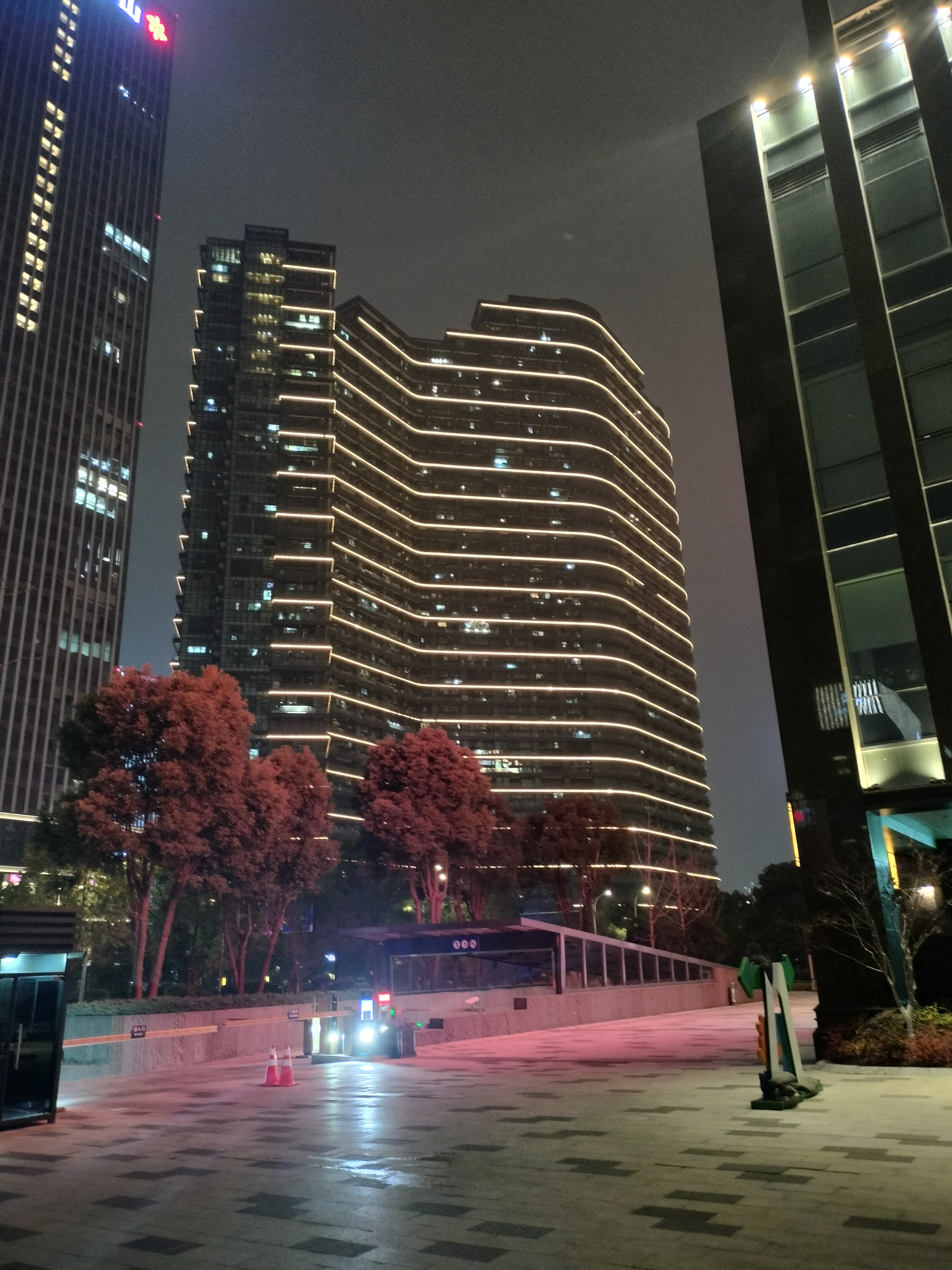
Regent International Center at night

The structure was originally planned to be a luxury hotel. It still contains several of the features originally planned for the hotel, such as an ornate lobby. The building's architect was Alicia Loo, who has also designed the Marina Bay Sands hotel in Singapore. The building is vaguely S-shaped, with a relatively plain design of repeating geometric patterns. Some of the amenities in the building include shopping centers, restaurants, schools, a hospital, gyms, grocery stores, swimming pools, salons, a food court, barber shops, and an internet cafe. The Regency International is equipped with advanced fire prevention and security systems. The building is believed to contain approximately 11,250 individual apartments.

== Apartments ==
One month's rent for a windowless apartment is $209 USD, while a large apartment with a balcony can go for as much as $558. The apartments are dog-friendly.

== Reception ==
=== Positive ===
The inclusion of many necessities in the building reduces the need for much travel. The fact that it was originally designed to be a hotel results in some very grand features, such as the lobby. The hugeness of the complex has made it quite well-known on social media. One TikTok video about the building has over 780,000 views. As a result, a large number of the building's residents are social media personalities.

=== Criticism ===
The architectural design has been called "dull," and the entire concept of the complex is frequently referred to as "dystopian." Residing in a "self-sufficient living environment" can negatively affect an individual's mental health. In addition, the tightly packed apartments can cause claustrophobia. The various amenities are restricted by the floor the residents live on, and different floors have different rent prices, which can result in socioeconomic differences between residents. A lack of privacy and noise pollution are cited as additional concerns. Finally, the detachment between Regent International and the rest of Hangzhou has been criticized.

== See also ==
- Edifício Copan, also S-shaped building, largest apartment building in Brazil by capacity.
- Central Park Tower, the world's tallest apartment building.
- Begich Towers, an apartment building which houses almost the entire population of Whittier, Alaska
- Arcology
- List of largest office buildings
- List of largest buildings
