= Václav Vaca =

Czech artist

- Born: 1948; Czechoslovakia
- Education: Prague Conservatory
- Known for: Painter
- Movement: Surrealism
- Awards: XSABA International Foundation Award, Merlin Foundation Award for Excellence in the Arts

Václav Vaca (born 1948) is a Czech surrealist artist.

== Biography ==
=== Childhood – 1948–1968 ===
Václav Vaca was born in 1948 in Czechoslovakia (today the Czech Republic). From 1963 to 1968 he studied at the Prague Conservatory. Vaca began his artistic career as a ballet dancer and musician. When standing on a street corner performing with his troupe in Paris, he decided to leave for North America.

=== Canada and painting – 1969–present day ===
In 1969 Vaca moved to Canada and became a painter. He began to exhibit widely in Canada and the United States. He now lives and works in Toronto, Ontario. In 1982 he featured in a television documentary on CBC television entitled "Vaclav Vaca – Fantastic Visions". He now runs an interior design business.

== Works ==
His works, which are surrealist, are all brightly coloured and dream-like. Some of his works incorporate religion such as "Gate to heaven" and "The cup".

== Solo exhibitions ==
Since 1973, Vaca has had 15 solo exhibitions, with the most recent being in 2006.
