= Oath of Fealty (novel) =

1981 novel by Larry Niven and Jerry Pournelle

- First edition cover (publ. Phantasia Press); Cover art by Paul Lehr
- Author: Larry Niven and Jerry Pournelle
- Publisher: Phantasia Press
- Publication date: 1981

Oath of Fealty is a 1981 novel by American writers Larry Niven and Jerry Pournelle, published originally by Phantasia Press, then by Timescape Books, with numerous reprints. Set in the near future, it involves an arcology, a large inhabited structure, called Todos Santos, which rises above a crime-ridden Los Angeles, California, but has little beyond casual contact with the city. The novel popularized the phrase "think of it as evolution in action", which occurs elsewhere in Niven's books. The novel anticipated the building of the Los Angeles subway. It was included in David Pringle's book Science Fiction: The 100 Best Novels.

== Plot summary ==
In the near future, a race riot results in the destruction of an area just outside Los Angeles. The city sells the construction rights to a private company, who then construct an arcology, named Todos Santos, to which control of the area and legal jurisdiction was ceded. The higher standard of living enjoyed by Todos Santos residents causes resentment among Angelenos. The arcology dwellers have evolved a different culture, sacrificing privacy – there are cameras (not routinely monitored) even in the private apartments – in exchange for security. The residents are fiercely loyal to the arcology and its management, and the loyalty runs both ways. During the course of the novel, Todos Santos is compared to a feudal society, with loyalty and obligations running both ways, hence the title of the novel. The systems at the arcology are run by MILLIE, an advanced computer system, and some high-level executives have direct links to MILLIE via bio-electronic implants in their brains. Other workers in the arcology work by telepresence, including one woman who remotely operates construction equipment on a lunar base.

Todos Santos causes resentment among Angelenos, but has improved their lives as well. The company that owns the arcology tows icebergs in, solving the water shortage for all Southern Californians. Todos Santos has dug a Los Angeles subway using a digging machine, which uses an oxyhydrogen torch. Todos Santos is at the hub of the subway system, and contains a huge mall, which Angelenos may visit. This easy access causes Los Angeles' city officials to complain about the shopping dollars and tax revenues going outside the city limits.

As the story opens, three young Angelenos sneak into the maintenance areas of Todos Santos. When they are detected by Todos Santos' security systems and personnel, they give every appearance of being terrorists, including spoofing the correct electronic access codes. When non-lethal means of stopping the three fail, Deputy Manager Preston Sanders orders lethal gas released rather than risk the disastrous consequences of a bomb going off. Two of the intruders are killed. They turn out to be youths, with high tech equipment and boxes with such labels as "bomb", but without the actual means of harming the arcology. It soon turns out that they were duped by the "Friends of Man and the Earth Society" (FROMATES), anti-technology zealots who want to see Todos Santos destroyed or abandoned, as a means of forcing the arcology to turn off its lethal defenses for a later real attack.

The deaths of the two youths cause political problems. Sanders is charged with murder. While arcology manager Art Bonner is quite prepared to defy the city authorities, Sanders turns himself in. The arcology is forced to turn off its lethal defenses as the FROMATES planned. When that happens, they soon face a full-fledged attack by the FROMATES, which they deter by non-lethal means, until the intruders prove they have deadly weapons, at which point Todos Santos security responds in kind, shooting and killing most of the intruders. While city authorities are still reacting to this, the arcology launches a jailbreak, the idea of chief engineer (and resident genius) Tony Rand. They tunnel under the jail using the tunneling machine that the "Saints" used to build the L.A. subway, release sleep gas into the jail, and free Sanders.

Los Angeles soon retaliates with arrest and search warrants, but they are soon defeated by the sheer size of the arcology and the ability of the Todos Santos executives, aided in part by their direct links to MILLIE, to hide Rand and Sanders. After Todos Santos shows that it can cause Los Angeles trouble, such as by contaminating the Los Angeles water supply with salt water, and by work stoppages among the telepresence operators, a truce is arrived at: Rand and Sanders will leave the country permanently, and relations between Los Angeles and Todos Santos will be restored. In effect, Todos Santos has won, if only by restoring the status quo ante.

== Reception ==
It was chosen as one of the 100 best science fiction novels from 1949–1984, by critic David Pringle. It has been nominated numerous times for a Prometheus Award for best classic libertarian science fiction novel.
