= Begich Towers =

Building in Whittier, Alaska

Begich Towers Condominium
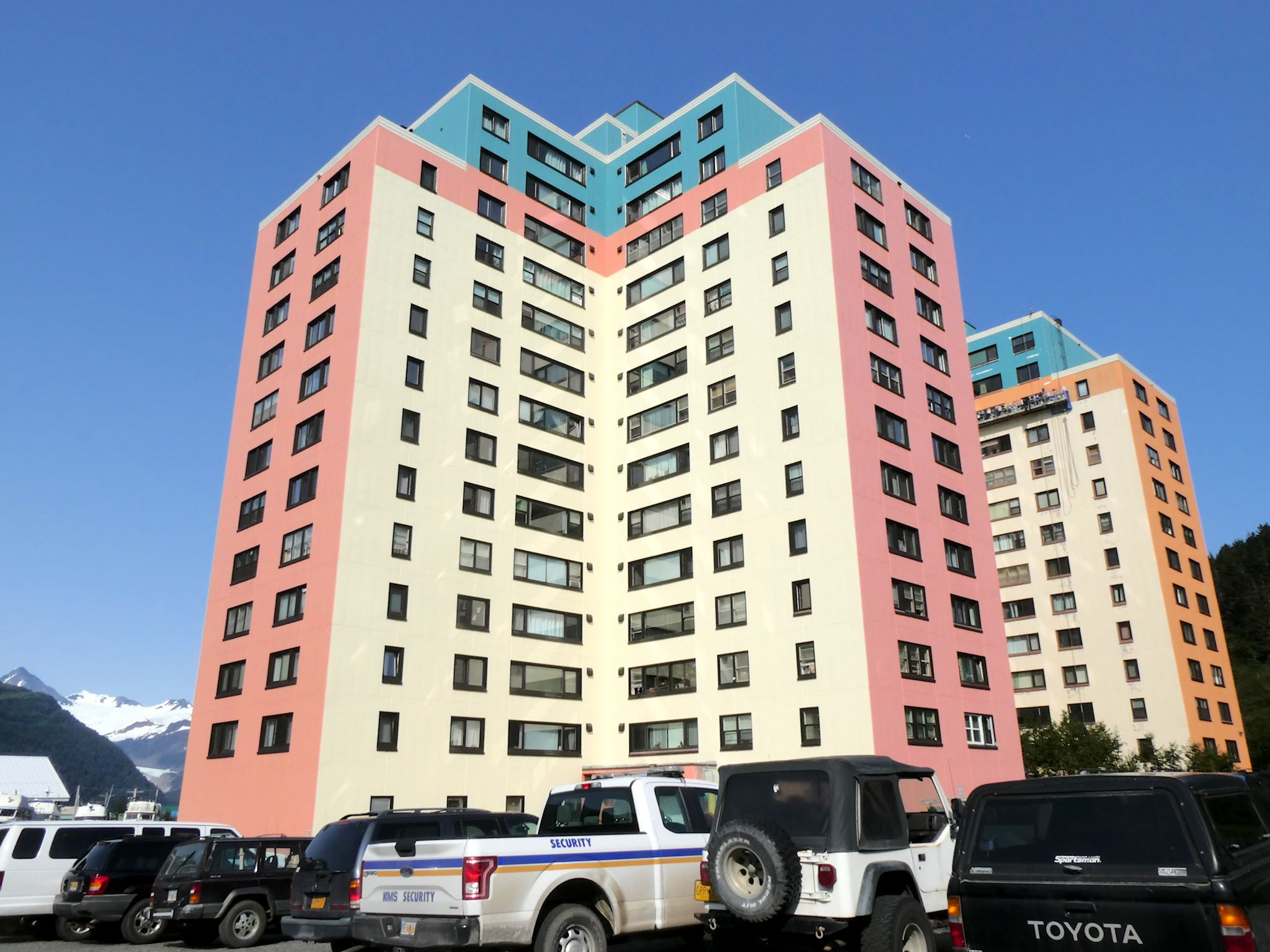
- The Begich Towers
- Former names: Hodge Building

General information
- Location: Whittier, Alaska, United States
- Coordinates: 60°46′20″N 148°41′08″W
- Current tenants: Majority of Whittier's population, public services and businesses
- Construction started: 1953; 73 years ago
- Completed: 1957; 69 years ago
- Renovated: 2016
- Renovation cost: $3 million
- Client: US Army Corps of Engineers
- Landlord: Begich Towers Condominium Association of Apartment Owners Inc.

Technical details
- Floor count: 14

Other information
- Number of suites: 196 (apartments)

Website
- begichtowers.com

The Begich Towers Condominium is a building in the small American city of Whittier, Alaska. The structure is the residence of nearly the entire population of the city and home to many of its public facilities; this has earned Whittier the nickname of "town under one roof". The building is depicted on the city's seal.

== History ==
During World War II, the U.S. Army built a military harbor and a logistics base in present-day Whittier. After the war, the military planned a large complex of 12 multistory towers.

The building now known as Begich Towers was the first of these buildings. Designed in 1953 to host the headquarters of the US Army Corps of Engineers, it was named the Hodge Building in memory of Colonel William Walter Hodge, commander of the 93rd Engineer Regiment on the Alcan Highway. Construction shortly began on another of the towers: the Buckner Building 660 yards (600 m) to the northeast. Both opened in 1957, and were used by the Army until the early 1960s; the Buckner Building has been abandoned since 1966. None of the other planned towers were built.

In 1964, the area was hit by a tsunami caused by the Good Friday earthquake, but the damage was not extensive. The Hodge Building was transformed into a public building with several units, including the headquarters of the major institutions and commercial services of Whittier.

In 1972, the building was renamed Begich Towers Condominium, in memory of Nick Begich, a congressman from Alaska who disappeared in the area, and is presumed to have died in a plane crash. In 1974, the Begich Towers Condominium Association of Apartment Owners Inc. became the official manager of the entire structure.

Most of the community and its services are inside, or connected to, the building, so residents can remain inside for long periods of time, which can be useful during inclement weather.

== Features ==
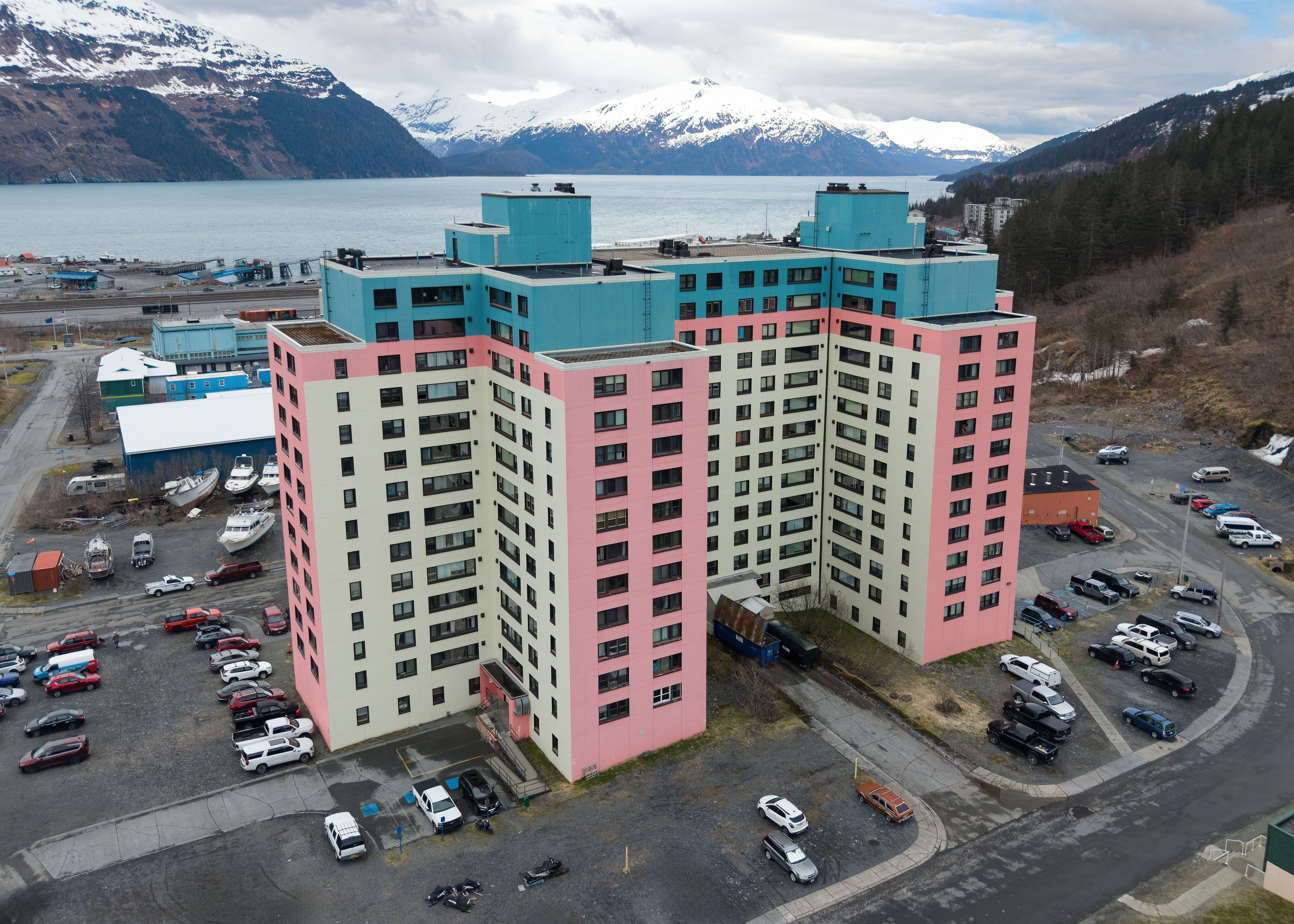
View of the building in spring 2026

Completed in 1957, the building has a rectangular plan, and flat roof. It is 14 floors high, and made up of three connected towers. Gaps of 7 or 8 inches allow the buildings to sway under wind or earthquakes. The north side has two protruding modules that form two square towers. Inside, sets of branched corridors and elevators allow residents access to all areas of the complex. The school is connected to the towers via a tunnel. Apartments are available in 1-, 2-, and 3-bedroom configurations.

In addition to the residential areas, the building contains the basic services for condo owners and guests: a post office, general store, and laundromat. There is also a small Baptist church, two floors of bed-and-breakfast daily rentals, a conference room, and an indoor playground at the school.

== Mechanical systems ==
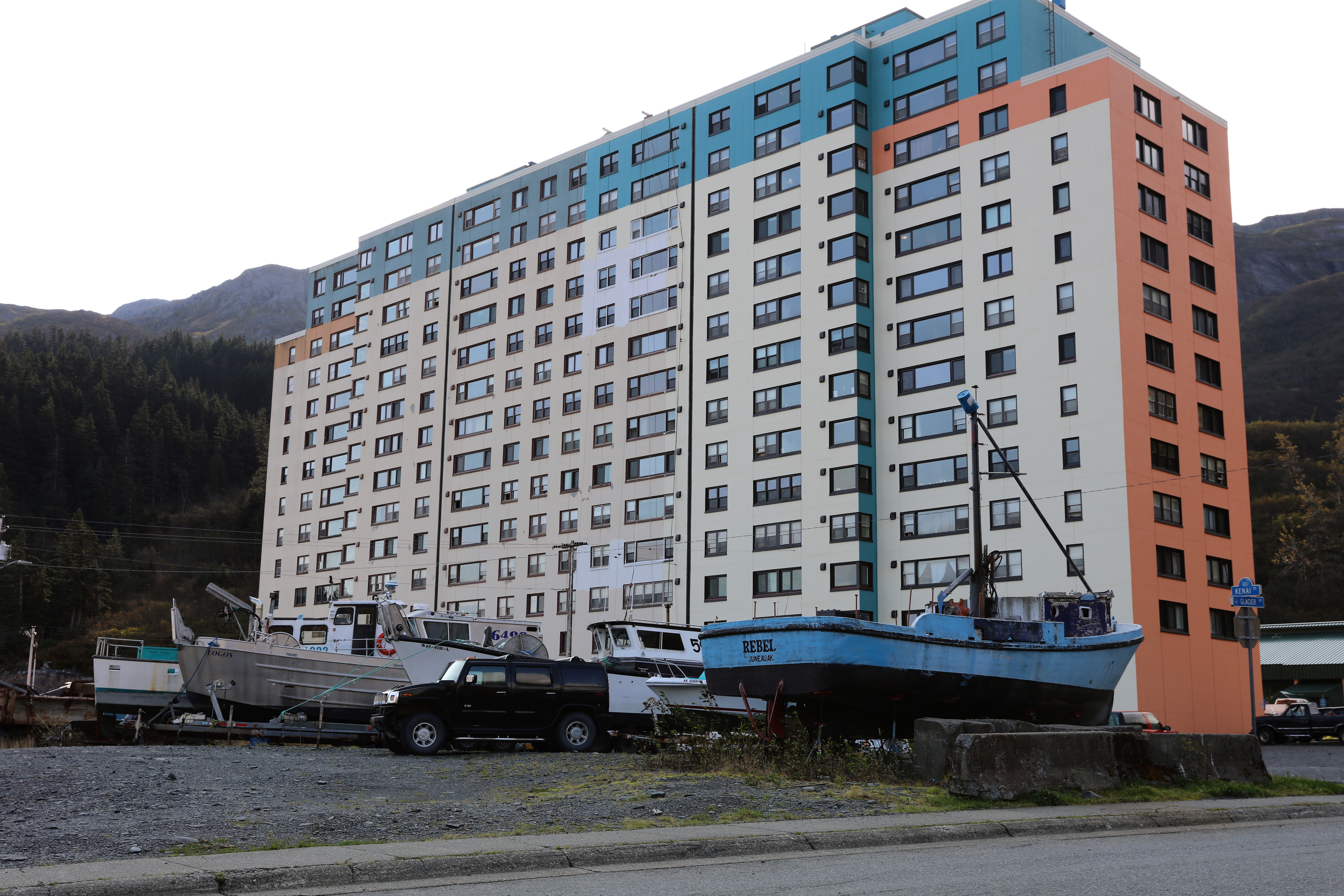
Front view in 2016 during the renovation

During the U.S. military's tenure in Whittier, all Whittier buildings had their hydronic heating needs fulfilled by a single heating plant. Following the Army's departure, each building had to get its own system, including the Begich Towers, which had a pair of boilers in a side building.

As of 2015, only one of the two boilers serving Begich Towers was functional, but it experienced major maintenance-related issues almost daily. The problems were traced back to the hydronic loop using water, which was susceptible to freezing, instead of a mixture of domestic water and glycol, which lowers the freezing point, and prevents pipes from bursting due to ambient temperatures dropping below 0 °C (32 °F).

As of 2016, funding for repairs relating to maintaining mechanical systems and renovating the façade came with a $3 million loan from the U.S. Department of Agriculture.

As of 2021, all four elevators in the building require a major overhaul, with repair or replacement estimates reaching hundreds of thousands of dollars.

== See also ==
- Fermont, a town in Quebec, Canada, known for a similar large, self-contained complex
- Regent International Center, an apartment building in Hangzhou, with a capacity of 20,000 residents
- Arcology
- Kowloon Walled City
