= Buckner Building =

Former U.S. military building in Whittier, Alaska, United States

- Near Whittier, Alaska in United States
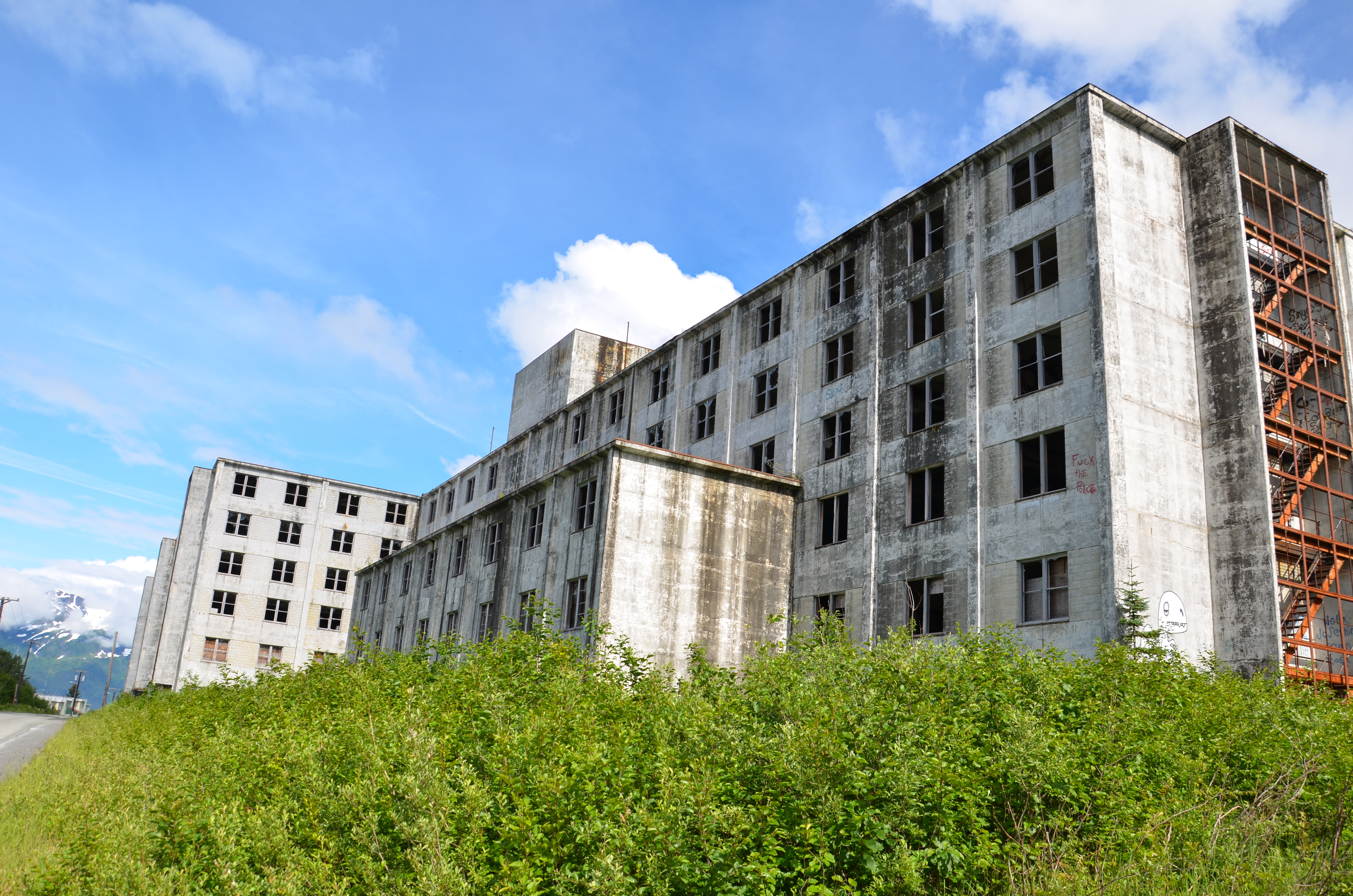
- The Buckner Building

Site information
- Type: Military building
- Owner: City of Whittier

Location
- Interactive map of Buckner Building
- Coordinates: 60°46′28.58″N 148°40′30.47″W
- Length: 500 feet (150 m)

Site history
- Built: 1953
- Built by: United States Army Corps of Engineers
- In use: 1966

The Buckner Building is an abandoned former U.S. military building in Whittier, Alaska, on the Western edge of the Prince William Sound.

== History ==
During the early stages of World War II, General Simon Buckner commanded the defense of Alaska and was concerned they would be attacked by air. To protect the troops, General Buckner recommended a facility that was independent from local power plants, bomb-proof, and that had sufficient storage spaces. Whittier, Alaska was the perfect place to have this military base.

First, the bay area around Whittier, Alaska has deep-water ports that stay ice-free year round. With Whittier being one of two all-weather railroad ports that supplied Anchorage with military necessities, it was important that it would stay functioning and safeguarded. Second, the almost constant cloud coverage would protect the facility from air strikes.

=== Annex ===
The Cold War triggered the United States Army Corps of Engineers to quickly build housing and recreational spaces for 1,000 soldiers moving to Whittier. The Composite Bachelor Housing Service and Recreation Center, also known as the Buckner Building, was completed in 1953. This combined building had a mess hall, sleeping quarters, movie theatre, bowling alley, small jail, and tunnels connecting the town of Whittier, Alaska.

The building used to be one of the largest in Alaska, often being referred to as "the city under one roof". The building is six stories tall, about 500 feet long by 50–150 feet wide and is approximately 275,000 square feet. The building was cast in place by reinforced concrete on slate/greywacke bedrock, 8,1.

=== Earthquake ===
In 1964, Whittier was hit by an earthquake that lasted about four and a half minutes. A total of 13 people died in Whittier and damages to federal and privately owned land was estimated to cost over $5 million. The Buckner Building was slightly damaged, though it was minimized due to the foundation being on bedrock, as opposed to the majority of the town which rests on unconsolidated sediment and therefore received more damage. The Buckner Building also runs northeast–southwest, oblique to the seismic motion, decreasing the effect of the earthquake on the building. There was no structural damage to the building, and subsequent inspections found the building to be in good condition.

=== Decline ===
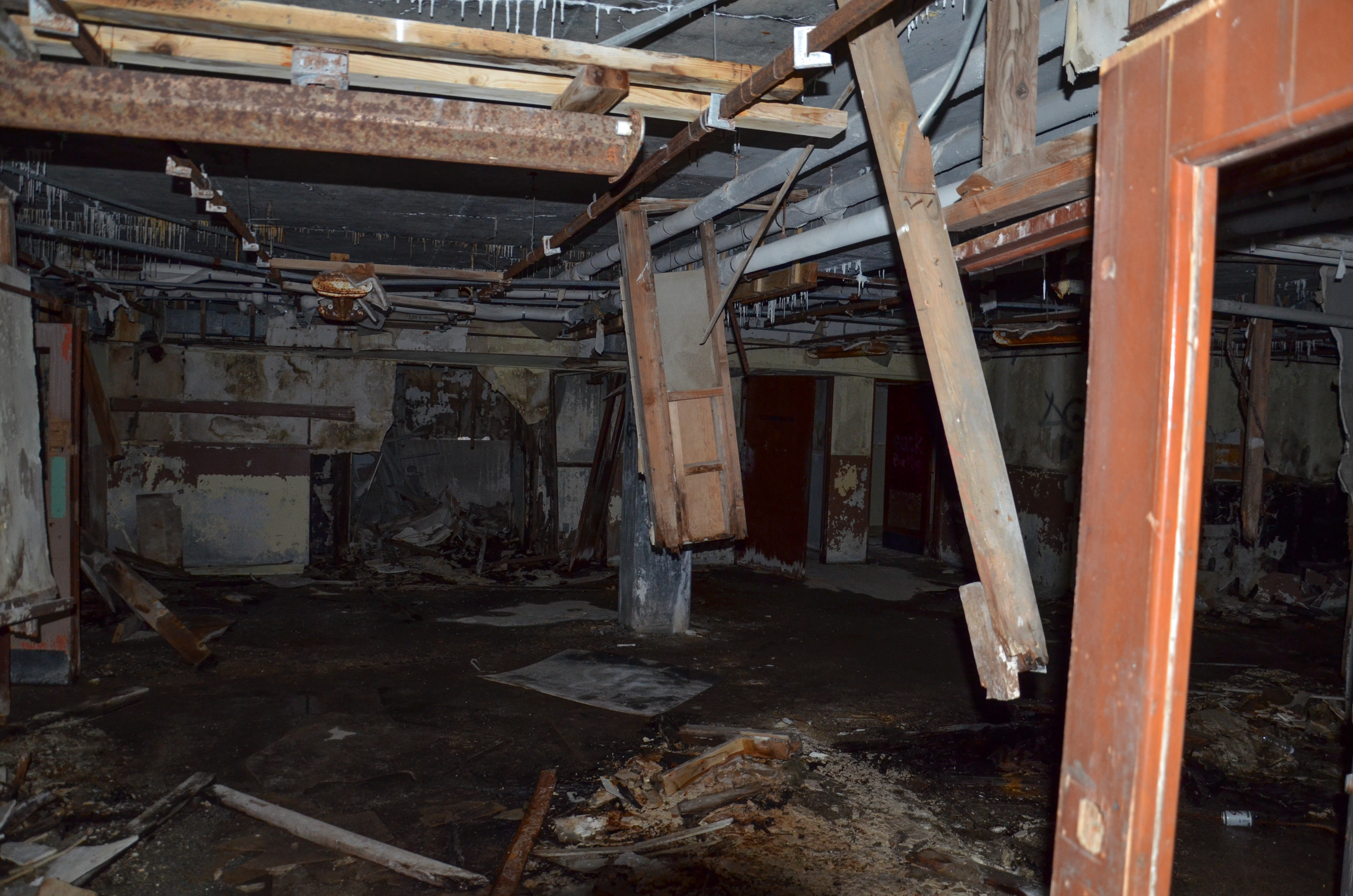
Interior view of the building in disrepair (2010)

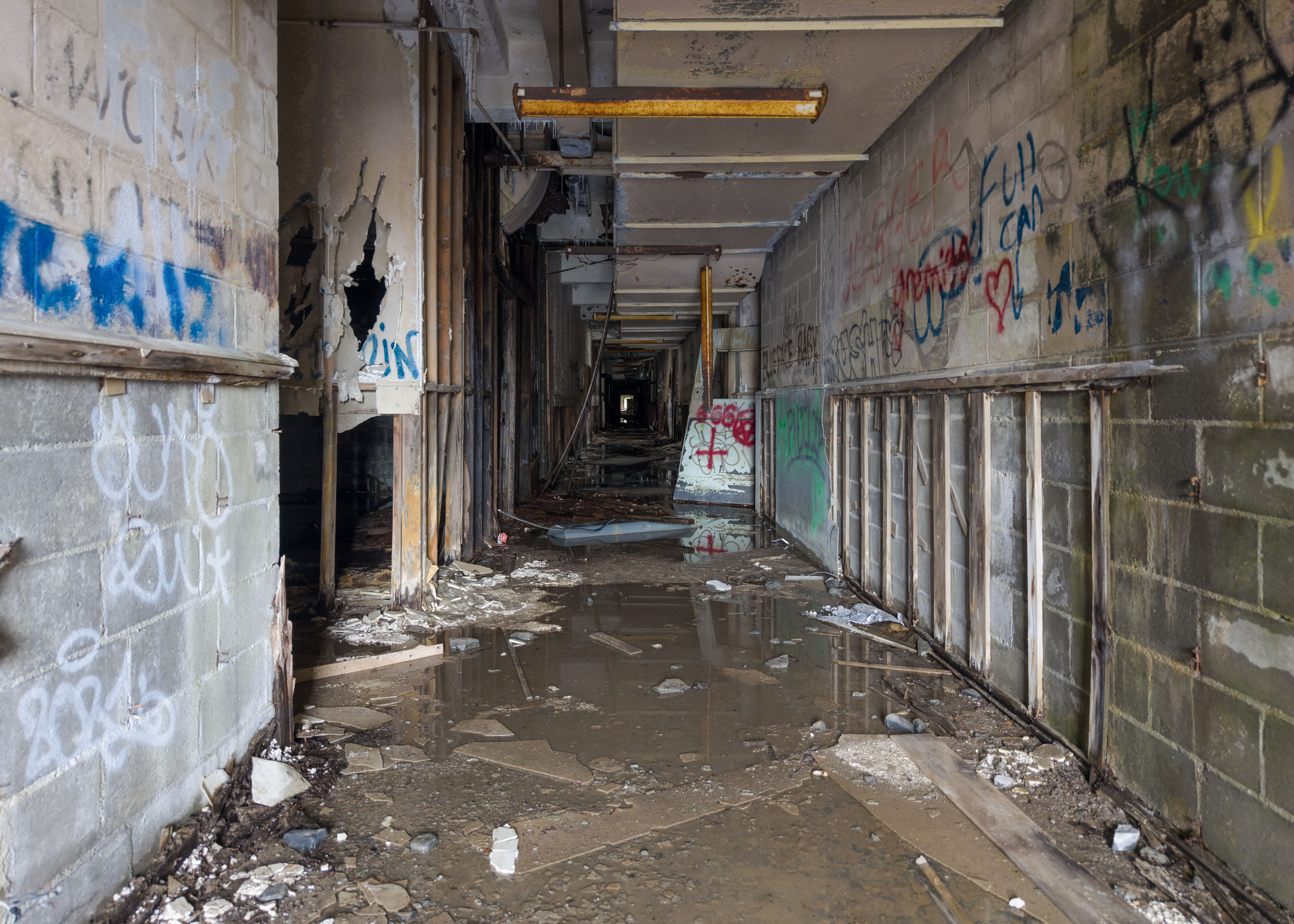
Hallway view (2026)

The building continued to operate until 1966, at which point the military pulled out and the Port of Whittier was transferred to the General Services Administration. After the military left, the ownership of the Buckner Building went through a handful of private citizens, starting in 1972. At one point, it was owned by Pete Zamarello who wanted to turn it into the state prison. With the windows and doors missing, the elements began to take it over in the 1980s. Water infiltrated, leaving the building in a constant state of freezing and thawing.

The building went into foreclosure in 2016. The city assumed ownership and a fence was built to keep trespassers out. A structural assessment of the building in 2016 concluded that it was unlikely that any significant portion of the building could be rehabilitated for occupancy.

== Environmental hazards ==
The decline of this building has left numerous hazardous materials exposed to the elements of nature. This aided the construction of the fence around the building to ensure the safety of people who dared to enter the building and to keep these toxic materials isolated. Some of the poisonous materials include asbestos, lead-based paint, PCBs, mold, and fuel residues. All these toxins, along with the structural damage caused by weathering and other earthquakes, have made renovation plans very challenging and expensive. However, the Cold War relic still stands as a marker of an interesting time in Alaskan history.

== Cultural and social impact ==
The Buckner Building, since its construction in 1953, has been a staple of Whittier culture, serving as a symbol of the port town's bombshell impregnability, and creating the idea of the “City Under One Roof” that still exists today through the efforts of the Begich Towers. Residents today still admire the building for what it once provided.

== Urban exploring ==
Since the 1980s, this building has been a tourist attraction and, to some extent, a local one, as it is surrounded by urban ghost legends and its decaying structure emits an ominous, eerie ambience. This leads adventurers and explorers to seek out the untold secrets of this beautiful abandoned building, as well as photographers looking for a unique structure to capture, as its deteriorating walls contrast with the natural scenery behind it, creating a haunting beauty.

== Future ==
As the building stands now, no future endeavors are planned, and there is debate over whether to restore the grand building or preserve it in Whittier's history, both options being costly.

== See also ==
- Begich Towers a newer "city under one roof" also located in Whittier
