= Whittier, Alaska =

City in the Unorganized Borough, Alaska

- City
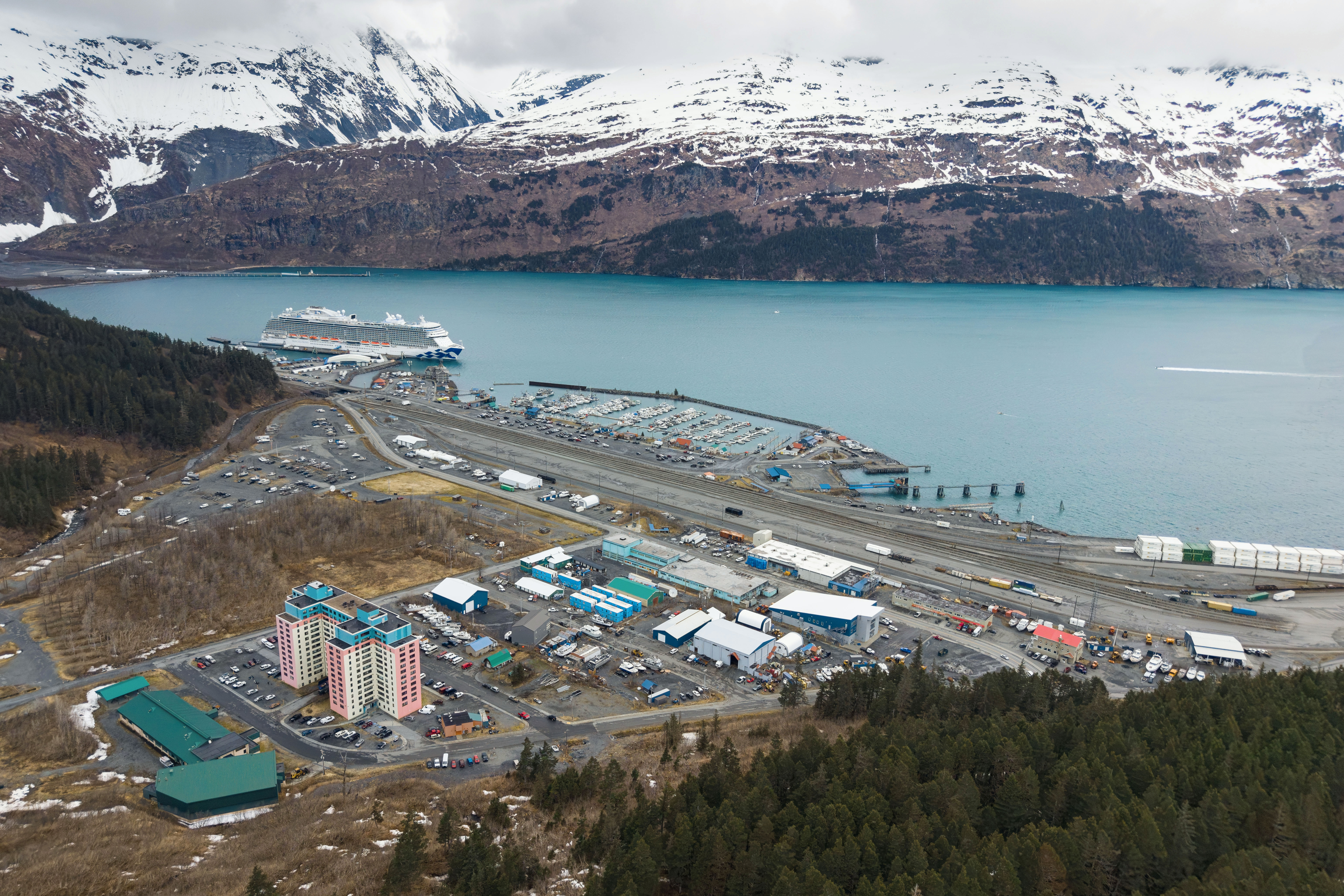
- Whittier in May 2026

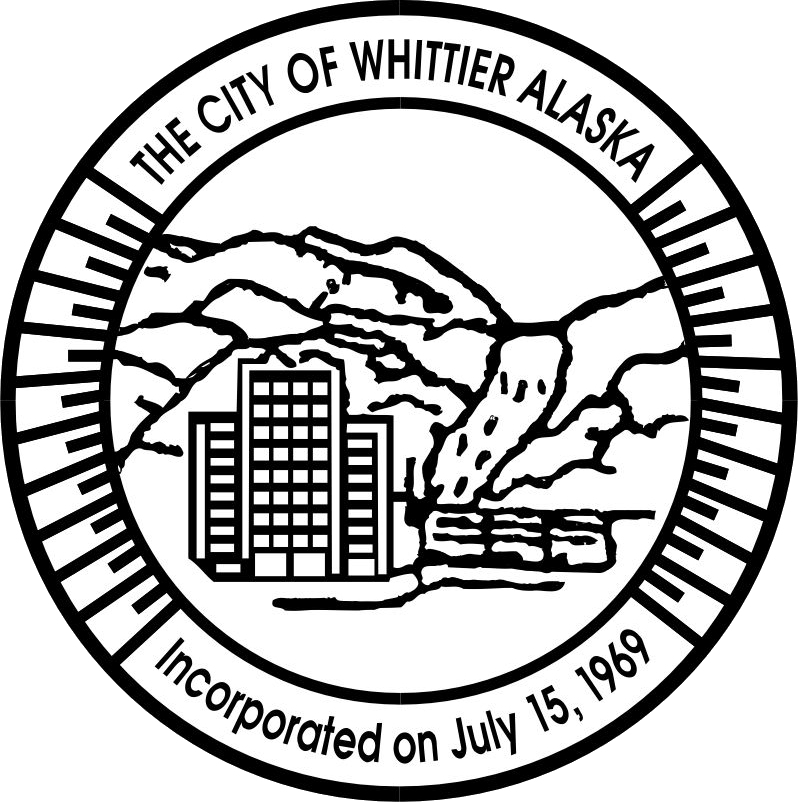
- Flag Seal Logo
- Nickname: The Town Under One Roof
- Location in Alaska
- Coordinates: 60°46′27″N 148°40′40″W
- Country: United States
- State: Alaska
- Borough: Unorganized
- Census area: Chugach
- Incorporated: July 15, 1969

Government
  - Type: Council–manager
  - Mayor: Daniel Blair
  - City manager: Jackie Wilde
  - State senator: Cathy Giessel (R)
  - State rep.: Laddie Shaw (R)

Area
  - Total: 19.64 sq mi (50.86 km^{2})
  - Land: 12.25 sq mi (31.73 km^{2})
  - Water: 7.39 sq mi (19.13 km^{2})
- Elevation: 43 ft (13 m)

Population (2020)
  - Total: 272
  - Density: 22.2/sq mi (8.57/km^{2})
- Time zone: UTC−09:00 (Alaska (AKST))
  - Summer (DST): UTC−08:00 (AKDT)
- ZIP Code: 99693
- Area code: 907
- FIPS code: 02-84510
- GNIS feature ID: 1415757
- Website: whittieralaska.gov

Whittier is a city at the head of the Passage Canal in the Chugach Census Area in the Unorganized Borough of Alaska, about 58 miles (93 km) southeast of Anchorage. The city is located within the Chugach Census Area, established in 2019 when the former Valdez–Cordova Census Area was dissolved.

The city's population was 272 at the 2020 census, having increased from 220 in 2010. Almost all of its residents live in the Begich Towers Condominium, earning it the nickname of a "town under one roof".

Whittier has an extremely wet climate, receiving an average of 197 inches (5,000 mm) of precipitation per year. It is a port for the Alaska Marine Highway.

== History ==
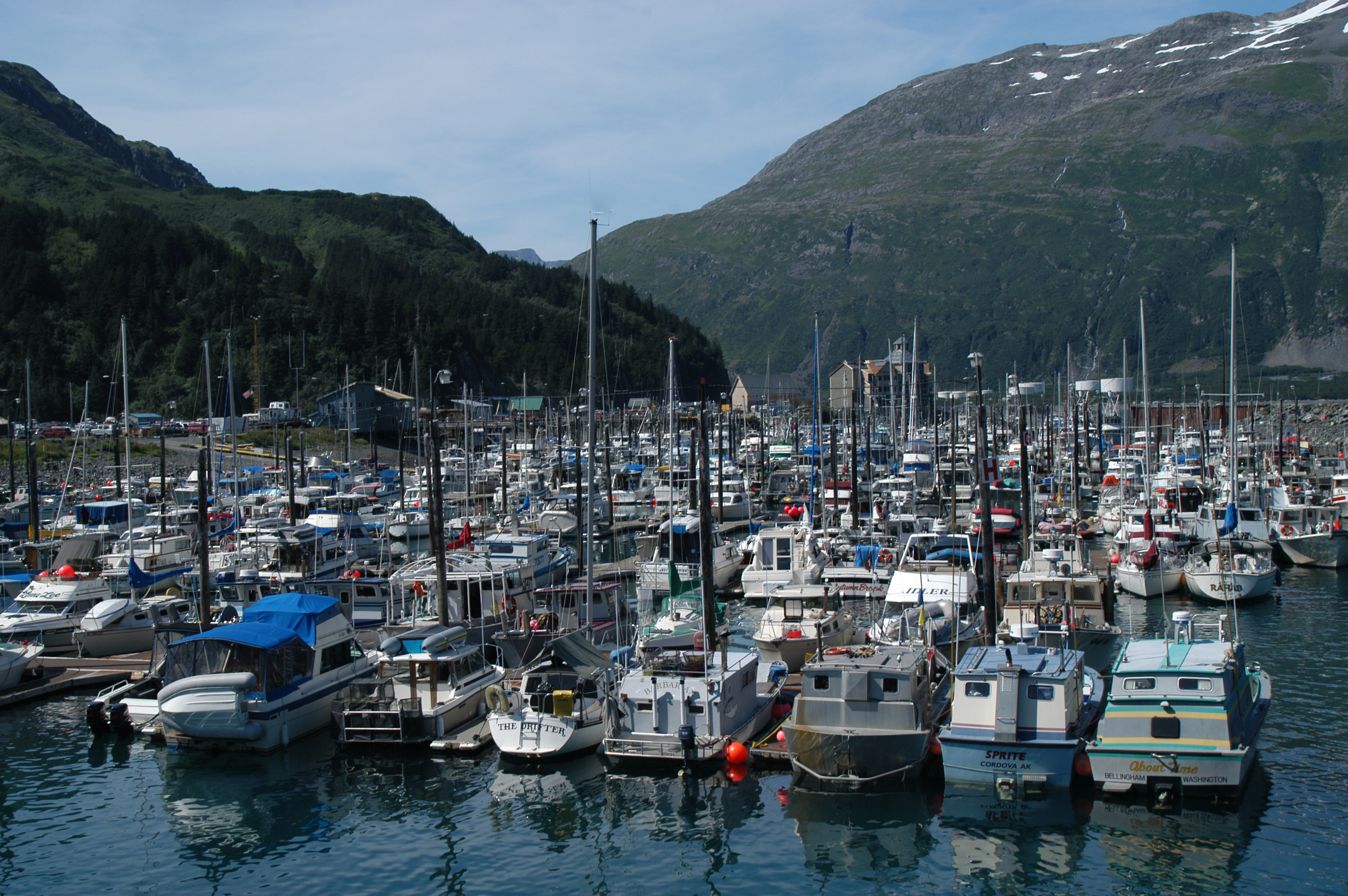
Boats moored at Whittier's harbor in July 2003

The region occupied by Whittier was once part of the portage route of the Chugach people native to Prince William Sound. Later, the passage was used by Russian and American explorers, and by prospecting miners during the Klondike Gold Rush. The nearby Whittier Glacier was named for American poet John Greenleaf Whittier in 1915, and the town eventually took the name as well.

During World War II, the United States Army constructed a military facility, complete with port and railroad, near Whittier Glacier and named the facility Camp Sullivan. The spur of the Alaska Railroad to Camp Sullivan was completed in 1943, and the port became the entrance for United States soldiers into Alaska.

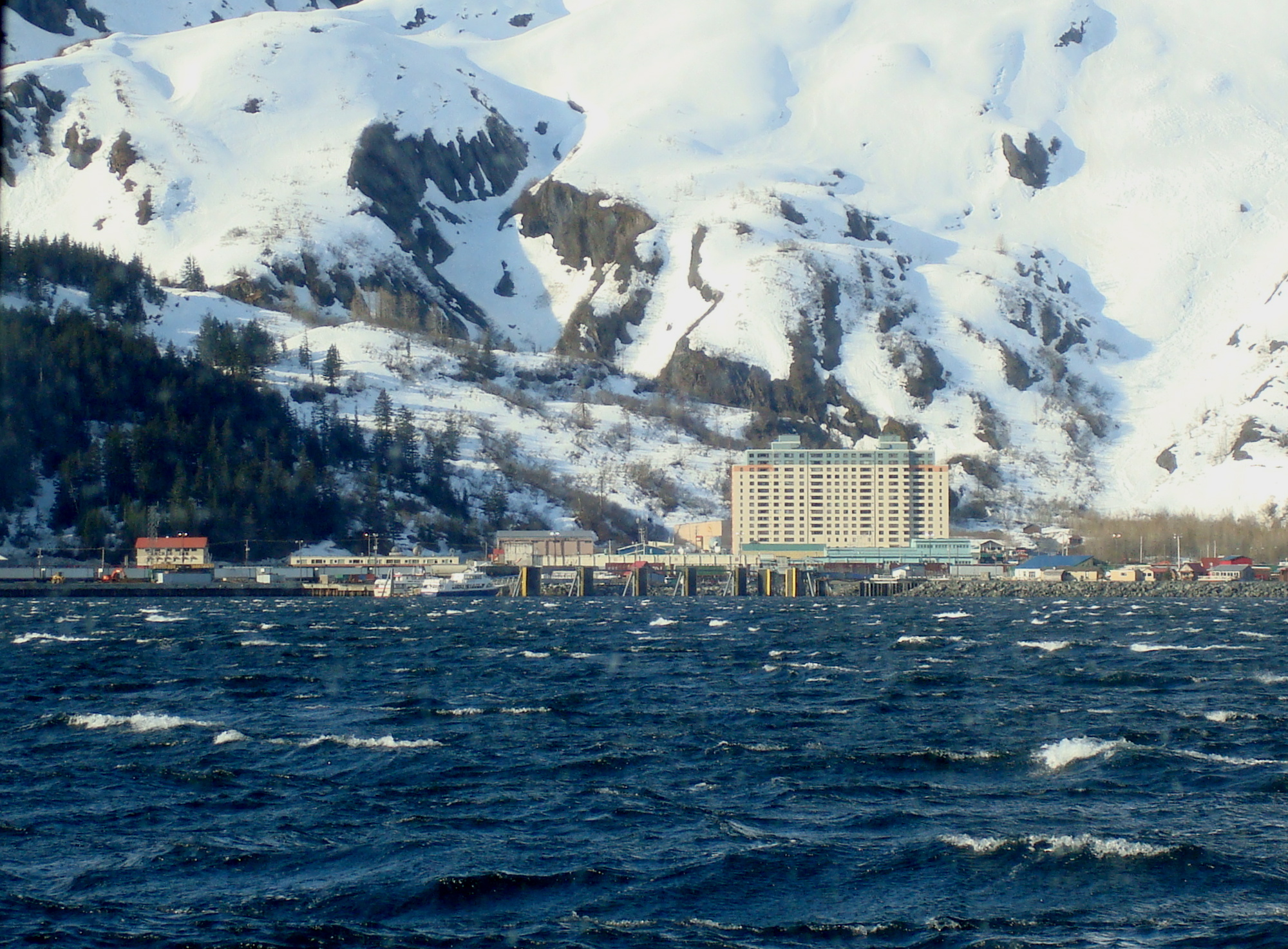
The Begich Towers in May 2008; it is home to the vast majority of Whittier's residents and is depicted on the city's seal.

The two buildings that dominate the town were built after World War II. The 14-story Hodge Building (renamed Begich Towers) was completed in 1957 and contains 150 two-and-three-bedroom apartments plus bachelor efficiency units. Dependent families and Civil Service employees were moved into this high-rise. The Whittier School was connected by a tunnel at the base of the west tower so students could safely access school on days with bad weather. The building was named in honor of Colonel Walter William Hodge, who was a civil engineer and the commanding officer of 93rd Engineer Regiment on the Alcan Highway.

The other main structure in town, the Buckner Building, was completed in 1953, and was called the "city under one roof". The Buckner Building was eventually abandoned. Buckner and Begich Towers were at one time the largest buildings in Alaska. The Begich Towers building became a condominium and, along with the two-story private residence known as Whittier Manor, houses a majority of the town's residents.

The port at Whittier was an active Army facility until 1960. In 1962, the U.S. Army Corps of Engineers constructed a petroleum products terminal, a pumping station and a 62-mile-long (100 km), 8-inch (200 mm) pipeline to Anchorage in Whittier.

On March 27, 1964, Whittier suffered over US$10,000,000 (equivalent to $103,809,013 in 2025) worth of damage in what became known as the Good Friday earthquake. As of 2022, the earthquake remains the largest U.S. earthquake, measuring 9.2 on the moment magnitude scale, and having caused tsunamis along the West Coast of the U.S. The tsunami that hit Whittier reached a height of 13 m (43 ft) and killed 13 people.

Whittier was incorporated in 1969 and eventually became a port of call for cruise ships. It is utilized by local operations and about 100-passenger mid-sized cruise ships. When the Anton Anderson Memorial Tunnel opened to public access in 2000, it became the first highway to connect Whittier to Anchorage and inner Alaska—previously, the only ways to reach the town had been rail, boat and plane.

After the tunnel expanded access to Whittier, it began to be visited by larger cruise lines. It is the embarkation/debarkation point of one-way cruises from Anchorage to Vancouver by Princess Tours. Whittier is also popular with tourists, photographers, outdoor enthusiasts, paddlers, hikers, sport fishermen, and hunters because of its abundance of wildlife and natural beauty. Whittier is located within the Chugach National Forest, the second-largest national forest in the U.S.

Whittier is in the Chugach School District and has one school serving approximately 48 students from preschool through high school, according to the 2019 and 2020 enrollment numbers.

== Geography ==
The only land access is through the Anton Anderson Memorial Tunnel, a mixed-use road and rail tunnel. The town is on the northeast shore of the Kenai Peninsula, at the head of Passage Canal, on the west side of Prince William Sound. It is 58 miles (93 kilometers) southeast of Anchorage.

According to the United States Census Bureau, the city has a total area of 19.7 square miles (51 km^{2}), of which, 12.5 square miles (32 km^{2}) of it is land and 7.2 square miles (19 km^{2}) of it (36.36%) is water.

=== Climate ===
Climate chart for Whittier

Whittier has a subpolar oceanic climate (Cfc) using the 26.6 °F (−3.0 °C) isotherm and a subarctic climate (Dfc) using the 32.0 °F (0.0 °C) isotherm under the Köppen climate classification, and has an annual precipitation of 197.31 inches (5,012 mm). Whittier's main weather station receives just over 197 in (5,000 mm) of precipitation in the average year. Whittier is located at the northern tip of the world's northernmost temperate rainforest, the Tongass.

Whittier's annual average temperature is 41.1 °F (5.1 °C), with the hottest month being July at 57.2 °F (14.0 °C) and the coldest month being January at 28.2 °F (−2.1 °C). Temperature extremes ranged from −29 °F (−34 °C) on December 23, 1942, to 88 °F (31 °C) on July 23, 1966. Whittier's coldest temperatures typically fluctuate between 0 °F (−18 °C) and 10 °F (−12 °C) each year, so Whittier falls in USDA Plant Hardiness Zones 7a.

Climate data for Whittier, Alaska, 1991–2020 normals, extremes 1942–2011
Month	Jan	Feb	Mar	Apr	May	Jun	Jul	Aug	Sep	Oct	Nov	Dec	Year
Record high °F (°C)	54 (12)	53 (12)	54 (12)	66 (19)	76 (24)	82 (28)	88 (31)	87 (31)	73 (23)	71 (22)	56 (13)	48 (9)	88 (31)
Mean maximum °F (°C)	42.4 (5.8)	42.1 (5.6)	44.7 (7.1)	53.5 (11.9)	63.6 (17.6)	71.8 (22.1)	73.4 (23.0)	71.0 (21.7)	61.8 (16.6)	51.5 (10.8)	45.1 (7.3)	42.1 (5.6)	75.2 (24.0)
Mean daily maximum °F (°C)	32.6 (0.3)	33.3 (0.7)	35.7 (2.1)	43.8 (6.6)	53.1 (11.7)	61.1 (16.2)	63.4 (17.4)	61.5 (16.4)	54.2 (12.3)	44.0 (6.7)	36.5 (2.5)	33.9 (1.1)	46.1 (7.8)
Daily mean °F (°C)	28.2 (−2.1)	29.2 (−1.6)	31.2 (−0.4)	38.6 (3.7)	46.8 (8.2)	54.1 (12.3)	57.2 (14.0)	56.1 (13.4)	49.5 (9.7)	40.1 (4.5)	32.5 (0.3)	29.6 (−1.3)	41.1 (5.1)
Mean daily minimum °F (°C)	23.9 (−4.5)	25.2 (−3.8)	26.8 (−2.9)	33.3 (0.7)	40.6 (4.8)	47.1 (8.4)	51.1 (10.6)	50.7 (10.4)	44.7 (7.1)	36.1 (2.3)	28.5 (−1.9)	25.2 (−3.8)	36.1 (2.3)
Mean minimum °F (°C)	7.5 (−13.6)	11.1 (−11.6)	15.1 (−9.4)	24.6 (−4.1)	34.7 (1.5)	41.2 (5.1)	46.8 (8.2)	45.0 (7.2)	37.0 (2.8)	25.6 (−3.6)	15.5 (−9.2)	12.3 (−10.9)	3.0 (−16.1)
Record low °F (°C)	−18 (−28)	−15 (−26)	−5 (−21)	5 (−15)	15 (−9)	25 (−4)	35 (2)	34 (1)	23 (−5)	14 (−10)	−10 (−23)	−29 (−34)	−29 (−34)
Average precipitation inches (mm)	18.82 (478)	16.15 (410)	13.65 (347)	14.71 (374)	14.93 (379)	9.21 (234)	11.19 (284)	16.52 (420)	22.52 (572)	21.05 (535)	18.75 (476)	19.81 (503)	197.31 (5,012)
Average snowfall inches (cm)	50.0 (127)	44.8 (114)	55.1 (140)	15.9 (40)	1.8 (4.6)	0.0 (0.0)	0.0 (0.0)	0.0 (0.0)	0.0 (0.0)	5.9 (15)	33.3 (85)	61.4 (156)	268.2 (681.6)
Average precipitation days (≥ 0.01 in)	17.6	16.7	16.3	16.4	14.7	14.5	17.9	17.2	18.4	19.5	18.3	20.2	207.7
Average snowy days (≥ 0.1 in)	11.0	10.0	10.2	4.1	0.5	0.0	0.0	0.0	0.0	2.0	8.5	12.2	58.5
Source 1: NOAA
Source 2: XMACIS2 (mean maxima/minima 1981–2010)

== Demographics ==
Historical population
Census	Pop.	Note	%±
1950	627		—
1960	809		29.0%
1970	130		−83.9%
1980	198		52.3%
1990	243		22.7%
2000	182		−25.1%
2010	220		20.9%
2020	272		23.6%
2022 (est.)	265	▼	−2.6%
U.S. Decennial Census

Whittier first appeared on the 1950 U.S. census as an unincorporated village. It formally incorporated in 1969. Almost the entirety of this population lives within the 14-story Begich Towers.

=== 2020 census ===
As of the 2020 census, Whittier had a population of 272. The median age was 39.8 years. 22.8% of residents were under the age of 18 and 20.2% of residents were 65 years of age or older. For every 100 females there were 100.0 males, and for every 100 females age 18 and over there were 110.0 males age 18 and over.

0.0% of residents lived in urban areas, while 100.0% lived in rural areas.

There were 119 households in Whittier, of which 30.3% had children under the age of 18 living in them. Of all households, 38.7% were married-couple households, 33.6% were households with a male householder and no spouse or partner present, and 20.2% were households with a female householder and no spouse or partner present. About 32.7% of all households were made up of individuals and 8.4% had someone living alone who was 65 years of age or older.

There were 285 housing units, of which 58.2% were vacant. The homeowner vacancy rate was 0.0% and the rental vacancy rate was 11.8%.

Racial composition as of the 2020 census
Race	Number	Percent
White	153	56.2%
Black or African American	2	0.7%
American Indian and Alaska Native	10	3.7%
Asian	52	19.1%
Native Hawaiian and Other Pacific Islander	23	8.5%
Some other race	1	0.4%
Two or more races	31	11.4%
Hispanic or Latino (of any race)	10	3.7%

=== 2019 estimates ===
The median income for a household in the city was $45,000 in 2019. The per capita income for the city was $29,106. Unemployment in Whittier was at a rate of 8.0 percent.

== Government ==
City government consists of a seven-member council with a mayor and six council members.

The small city has three key departments: administration, public safety, and public works.

=== Services ===
Whittier Police Department is the main police force in the community. The department was founded in 1974 by Chief of Police Gordon Whittier and two officers, and retains the same level of permanent staff today, although in summer, temporary officers are hired when the town has many tourists. The office is in a one-room unit located on the first floor of the Begich Towers. The station has no place to hold or interrogate people.

Whittier Fire Department is a volunteer fire and rescue service with mutual aid from neighboring departments.

== Transportation ==
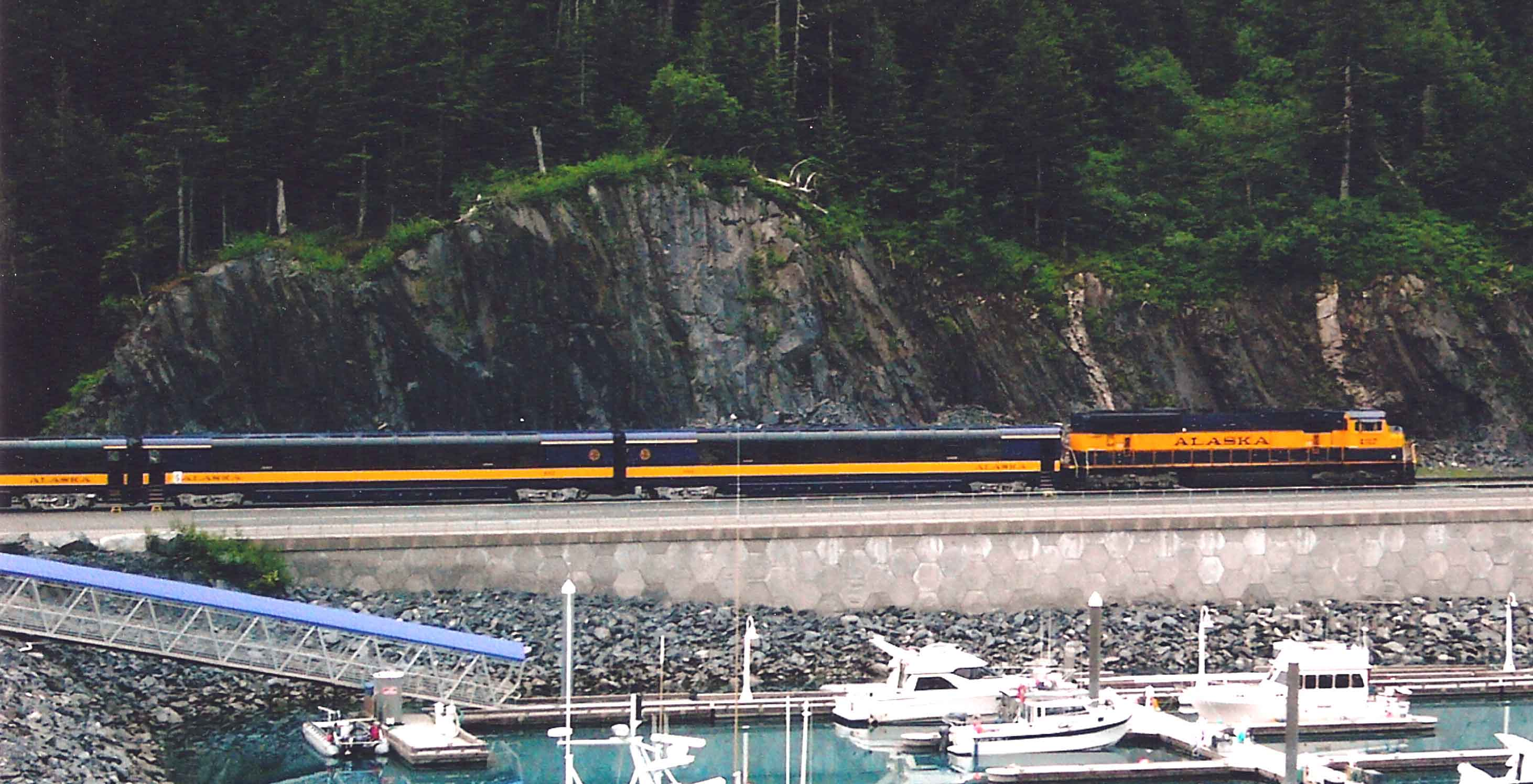
Alaska Railroad passenger train leaving Whittier towards the tunnel

=== Harbor ===
There is a harbor and a deep-water port used by cruise ships and the Alaska Marine Highway.

=== Airfield and seaplane dock ===
Whittier Airport (ICAO:PAWR) is an airfield with one aircraft runway designated 4/22 (formerly 3/21) with a gravel surface measuring 1,480 by 60 feet (451 by 18 m). There are no other facilities, and the runway is not maintained in winter. For the 12-month period ending December 31, 2005, the airport had 700 aircraft operations, an average of 58 per month: 97 percent general aviation and 3 percent air taxi. At that time there were two single-engine aircraft based at this airport. The runway was 500 feet (150 m) longer but was damaged by the 1964 Good Friday earthquake.

The city also operates a seaplane dock.

=== Tunnel ===
Known by locals as the Whittier tunnel or the Portage tunnel, the Anton Anderson Memorial Tunnel is a tunnel through Maynard Mountain. It links the Seward Highway south of Anchorage with Whittier and is the only land access to the town. It is part of the Portage Glacier Highway and at 13,300 feet (4,100 m), is the second-longest highway tunnel, and longest combined rail and highway tunnel in North America.

=== Alaska Rail connection ===
Whittier is Alaska Rail ARRC's connection to the rail systems in Canada and the lower 48 states (by way of rail barge).

== See also ==
- List of cities in Alaska
